= Henry Bonli =

Canadian painter and interior designer

Henry Thomas Bonli
- Born: 8 August 1927; Lashburn, Saskatchewan, Canada
- Died: 16 May 2011 (aged 83); Toronto, Ontario, Canada
- Occupation(s): Artist and interior designer

Henry Thomas Bonli (8 August 1927 – 16 May 2011) was a Canadian painter and interior designer.

== Early years ==
Henry Thomas Bonli was born in Lashburn, Saskatchewan, Canada, on 8 August 1927. He grew up in a large family. He attended Dover rural school and Melfort Collegiate. He obtained a teaching certificate at Saskatoon Normal School (later the Saskatoon Teachers' College) in 1947. At this school he was encouraged to paint by Wynona Mulcaster, and made a mural of the prairies named Open Spaces. Bonli taught in a rural school for a short period. He then became a teacher in Meadow Lake, Saskatchewan until 1950, when he began to study art.

Bonli married Elsa Pederson (born 6 September 1930), daughter of Danish parents who immigrated to Saskatchewan in 1927. She was a registered nurse who worked at Melfort Hospital before their marriage. They had two children, Scott and Jane. Later they divorced and Elsa remarried.

Bonli studied with Illingworth Kerr and Luke Lindoe at the Provincial Institute of Technology and Arts in Calgary, Alberta. He then went to the Art Center School in Los Angeles and the University of Southern California, studying water colors and fabric design. While in Los Angeles he had a part-time job with the Bullochs Department Store in their design studio, where he gained practical experience in interior design.

== Career ==
=== Saskatoon ===
Bonli returned to Saskatoon and worked at Clark's Interior Furnishings for four years while giving evening classes in art. Bonli participated in the first Emma Lake Artist Workshop in 1955, and in subsequent workshops in 1956, 1957, 1962, 1963, and 1965. At these workshops he studied with Jack Shadbolt, Joseph Plaskett, Will Barnet, Clement Greenberg, Kenneth Noland, Jules Olitski, and Lawrence Alloway. In 1957, he taught the young Joan Anderson at Saskatoon Technical Collegiate. She would later be better known as the singer Joni Mitchell. Then aged thirteen, she had planned to take lessons from the well-known landscape and figurative Ernest Lindner, but he was on sabbatical that year. Bonli found her an argumentative pupil. (Note: His student Joan Anderson reportedly liked the way that Bonli's name ended in "i", and changed her name to Joni for this reason.)

In 1957 Bonli founded Bonli Interiors in Saskatoon. It first occupied James Art Studio and then moved to premises on the lower floor of the King George Hotel that had been vacated by the Mendel Art Gallery. The firm provided interior design services and the store sold gifts and bath accessories, imported Scandinavian furniture and window coverings. Bonli soon began to also undertake residential and commercial work in Regina, where he had a full-time representative. In 1958 Bonli appeared on a weekly CTV television show with Margaret Dallin, and then on a show with Sally Merchant called Here Comes Sally. He also took summer courses at the Parsons School of Design in New York City. In New York, Henry and his wife Elsa became friends of the critic Clement Greenberg.

Bonli was an admirer of New York abstract expressionists such as Barnett Newman. He was encouraged by the art collector Fred Mendel to exhibit his work. He participated in shows at the Mendel Art Centre and the Dunlop Gallery in Regina. Bonli was a member of the Saskatchewan Arts Board and the Saskatchewan Society of Artists. He was vice-president of the Saskatoon Art Centre. He was an art consultant for the Saskatoon School System for three years, and was Assistant Curator at the Coste House art centre in Calgary. He held a one-man show at the Mendel Art Gallery in 1965.

=== Toronto ===
Bonli moved with his family to Toronto in 1965 where they opened Bonli Gallery, selling art and furniture. Later he opened two more stores, both called "Henri The Second", which sold factory over-runs and designer furnishings. In 1966–67, Joni Mitchell would often stay rent-free at Bonli's Toronto studio over Rugantino's restaurant on Yonge Street, with her husband Chuck Mitchell, and at times was babysitter for the Bonlis' daughter Jane. The Bonlis considered that Chuck was the better singer of the two, and would be the one to succeed. By this time Bonli had become a reasonably well-known painter. Bonli continued to return to Saskatoon to execute interior design commissions. In 1974 he sold his interior design company and devoted himself to painting.

Henry Thomas Bonli died at St. Michael's Hospital, Toronto, on 16 May 2011. He was aged 83.

== Exhibitions and collections ==
Bonli's works in acrylic and watercolour began to be exhibited in galleries across Canada in the early 1950s. He held a number of solo exhibitions in Regina, Saskatoon, and Toronto. Bonli's work is held by the National Gallery of Canada in Ottawa, the Saskatchewan Arts Board, University of Saskatchewan, Mendel Art Gallery in Saskatoon, MacKenzie Art Gallery in Regina and the Montreal Museum of Fine Arts.

== Sources ==
- Bonli, Henry (1965). Henry Bonli: A One Man Show. Mendel Art Gallery.
- "Henry Bonli Obituary". The Star Phoenix. 21 May 2011.
- "Henry Bonli". Saskatchewan NAC.
- "Henry Thomas Bonli". Melfort Journal.
- "PEDERSON, Martin and Ellen". Western Development Museum. Archived from the original on 28 July 2014.
- Robertson, Sheila (10 August 2000). "From the flatlands". Western People.
- Weller, Sheila (8 April 2008). Girls Like Us: Carole King, Joni Mitchell, Carly Simon—And the Journey of a Generation. Simon and Schuster. ISBN 978-1-4165-6477-5.
