= Terry Fenton =

Canadian artist

- Born: July 1, 1940 (age 86); Regina, Saskatchewan
- Education: University of Regina, Emma Lake Artists' Workshops,
- Known for: painter, writer, Curator
- Movement: landscape painting, modernism,
- Patrons: University of Lethbridge

Terry Fenton (born July 1, 1940) is a Canadian artist, author, critic, and curator known for his landscape paintings, his support of modernist art, and his writing on the work of artists such as Jack Bush, Anthony Caro, Peter Hide, Dorothy Knowles, Ken Macklin, Kenneth Noland, Jules Olitski, and William Perehudoff. Fenton is the former director of the Edmonton Art Gallery (1972 – 1987), the A.C. Leighton Foundation, Calgary (1987 – 1993) and the Mendel Art Gallery, Saskatoon (1993 – 1997). Since 2013, Fenton has resided in Victoria, British Columbia.

== Education ==
Terry Fenton was born in Regina, Saskatchewan in 1940, and studied at Regina College's School of Fine Art (now University of Regina) from 1958–1960, with Ronald Bloore, Roy Kiyooka, and Arthur McKay. Moving to the Saskatoon campus to study English literature, Fenton earned his Bachelor of Arts degree in 1962. Along with studies at the University of Regina (1965–1966), Fenton attended Emma Lake Artists' Workshops in Saskatchewan with John Cage and Lawrence Alloway in 1965, Frank Stella in 1967, and Michael Steiner in 1969.

== Painting ==
The imagery in Terry Fenton's paintings is often focused on the large skies and wide open prairies of his home province. In Fenton's words:

"Because of their apparent lack of scenery, the open prairies haven't been much painted by anyone. Even painters who've flourished in Saskatchewan have preferred the river valleys in the plains or the aspen parkland and forest to the north and east. While I admire and have absorbed much from them, I'm drawn south and west to the grasslands, partly because I was born and raised in Regina, but especially because the colour and light there is so luminous."

Fenton's paintings can be found in a number of collections, including the University of Lethbridge, Alberta; the MacKenzie Art Gallery, Regina; the Art Gallery of Greater Victoria, British Columbia; and the Canada Council Art Bank, Ottawa.

== Writing ==
Fenton's writing on art has touched on subjects both historical and contemporary, from essays on Fayum mummy portraits and Giovanni Bellini's St. Francis in Ecstasy, to articles on Morris Louis and Adolph Gottlieb. Fenton has written a number of books, including monographs on Dorothy Knowles, Reta Cowley, Anthony Caro and Kenneth Noland, as well as his 2009 treatise on pictorial art, "About Pictures."
