= Wynona Mulcaster =

Canadian painter and teacher

Wynona Croft Mulcaster
- Wynona Mulcaster in 1939
- Born: April 10, 1915; Prince Albert, Saskatchewan, Canada
- Died: August 25, 2016 (aged 101); San Miguel de Allende, Mexico
- Occupations: Painter and teacher
- Known for: Landscape

Wynona Croft Mulcaster (April 10, 1915 – August 25, 2016) was a Canadian painter and teacher from Saskatchewan, best known for her prairie landscapes. She also played an important role in developing competitive riding in Saskatoon.

== Life ==
Wynona ("Nonie") Croft Mulcaster was born on 10 April 1915 in Prince Albert, Saskatchewan. She was interested in horses, and often made them the subjects of her early drawings. She was thirteen when she became owner of her first horse. In 1935 she rode in the Prince Albert Horse Show.

Mulcaster died in August 2016 at the age of 101 at her ranch in San Miguel de Allende, Mexico.

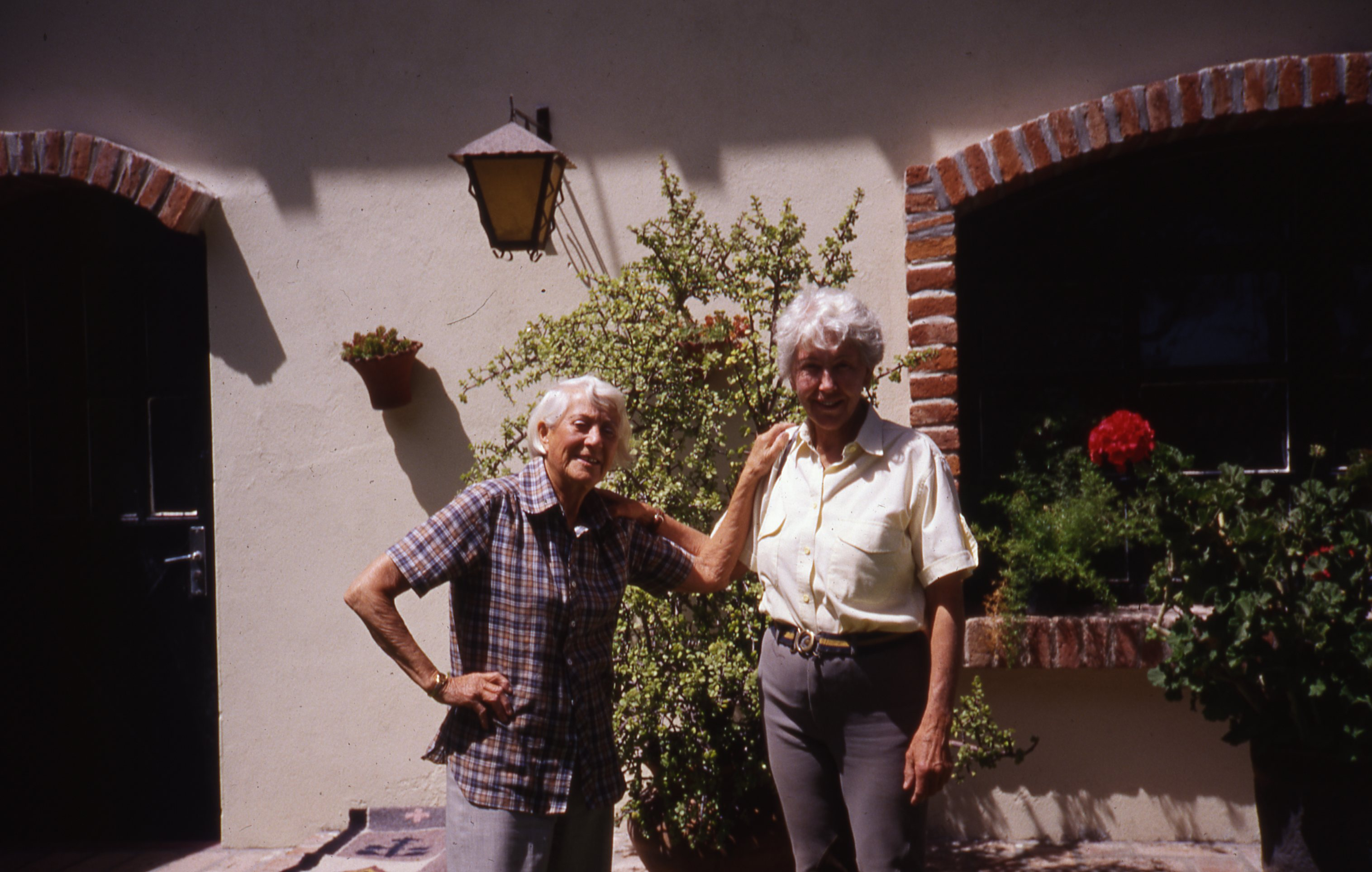
Nonie (Winona) Mulcaster (right) and friend Martha (left) outside their home in San Miguel, c. 2000

=== Education ===
Mulcaster studied art under Ernest Lindner from 1935 to 1945. One of her motives was to learn how to draw horses. In 1942 she obtained a BA in Art and English from the University of Saskatchewan. She studied under Henry George Glyde and A. Y. Jackson at the Banff School of Fine Arts in 1946, and under Arthur Lismer at the Montreal Museum of Fine Arts School of Art and Design in 1947. Mulcaster participated in Emma Lake Artists' Workshops led by Joseph Plaskett, Will Barnet and Kenneth Noland. The Canada Council gave her a grant that let her visit major art galleries in Europe in 1958–59. In 1976 she was awarded a Master of Fine Arts at the Instituto Allende in San Miguel de Allende, Mexico.

=== Teacher ===
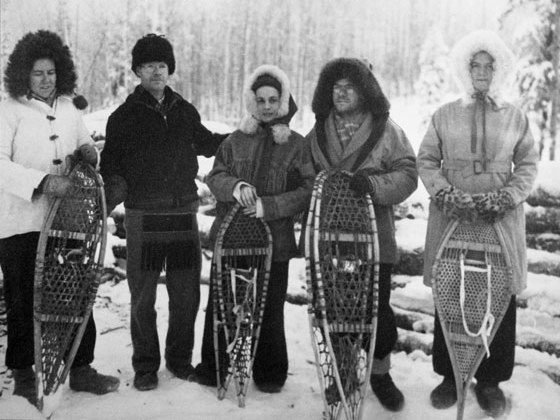
Okema beach, Emma Lake, December 1939. Left to right: Nonie Mulcaster, Dr. Leslie Saunders, Bodil Lindner, Ernest Lindner (?), Edith Cook (?)

In the late 1930s, Mulcaster helped establish what would later become the Emma Lake Artists' Workshops at Murray Point on Emma Lake in northern Saskatchewan. She was to attend workshops there from 1937 until 1993. Between 1937 and 1943 she taught art to school children in Prince Albert and rural Saskatchewan.

Mulcaster became a teacher at the Saskatchewan Teachers' College in Saskatoon in 1943, and was Director of Art Education there from 1945 to 1948. One of her students at the teacher's college in 1947 was Henry Bonli (1927–2011). Otto Rogers (born 1935) attended Saskatoon Teacher's College in 1952–53, where Mulcaster introduced him to cubism, a style he was to adopt for himself. Mulcaster helped establish the Canadian Society for Education through Art in 1955 in Quebec City. Charles Dudley Gaitskell was elected the first president.

From 1964 until 1977 Mulcaster was Associate Professor in the Department of Visual Art at the University of Saskatchewan. Her students included Robert Murray and Allen Sapp. Allen Sapp made oil and acrylic paintings of life on an Indian reservation. Mulcaster said his paintings were marked by a personal realism, recording the people, landscape, and animals with restraint, freshness and honesty.

=== Horses ===
In 1945 Mulcaster became the unpaid instructor at the Saskatoon Pony Club, where she taught until 1973. She helped to get a pavilion built for the club on the Exhibition grounds, and managed to obtain noted guest instructors for riding clinics. Many riders were influenced by Mulcaster, including Valerie Johnson Matheson, who represented Canada at the Pan-American Games in 1967, and Cathy Wedge, who competed for Canada at the Pan-American Games in 1971 and the Olympic Games in 1976. Wedge was on the Canadian team that won gold at the 1978 world championships. Gina Smith won a bronze medal at the 1988 Olympic Games and a gold medal at the 1991 Pan-American Games.

Mulcaster was inducted into the Saskatoon Sports Hall of Fame in 1994.

=== Artist ===
Mulcaster works were mainly in acrylics on canvas or paper. She is known for her prairie landscapes, which show the form and vitality of the land and the sky. She was given a Lifetime Award for Excellence in the Arts by the Saskatchewan Arts Board in 1993. As of 2014 she lived in San Miguel de Allende.

Mulcaster's work has been widely exhibited in Canada. Richard Simmins, first director of the Norman Mackenzie Art Gallery in Regina when it opened in 1953, arranged an exhibition of Ten Artists of Saskatchewan 1955. He featured young landscape artists such as Mulcaster, Reta Cowley and Dorothy Knowles and abstract painters such as Henry Bonli who later became well known. In March 1975 her work was included in an exhibition of Major Saskatchewan Artists at the Mendel Art Gallery in Saskatoon. Mulcaster's work is now held in many public and private collections. These include the Saskatchewan Arts Board in Regina, the Canada Council Art Bank in Ottawa, the MacKenzie Art Gallery, the Mendel Art Gallery and the Glenbow Museum in Calgary.

== Solo exhibitions ==
Mulcaster's work has been shown in many solo exhibitions, including:

- 1954 Saskatoon Art Centre
- 1959 Saskatoon Art Centre
- 1962 Saskatoon Art Centre
- 1965 Mendel Art Gallery, Saskatoon
- 1970 Saskatoon Public Library Gallery
- 1974 Osman Gallery, San Miguel de Allende, Mexico
- 1974 Shoestring Gallery, Saskatoon
- 1977 The Millard Gallery, Saskatoon
- 1978 Gallery One, Toronto
- 1979 Assiniboia Gallery, Regina
- 1980 Gallery One Studio, Saskatoon
- 1981 Gallery One, Toronto
- 1982 Gallery One Studio, Saskatoon
- 1983 Gallery One, Toronto
- 1983 Galerie Elca London, Montreal
- 1983 Gallery One Studio, Saskatoon
- 1983/85 "Wynona Mulcaster: A Survey 1973–1982"
  - Mendel Art Gallery, Saskatoon, then
  - Moose Jaw Art Museum, Moose Jaw
  - University of Lethbridge Art Gallery, Lethbridge
  - Mackenzie Art Gallery, Regina
  - Edmonton Art Gallery
- 1984 Canadian Art Galleries, Calgary
- 1985 Gallery One, Toronto
- 1986 Art Placement, Saskatoon
- 1987 Gallery One, Toronto
- 1988 Assiniboia Gallery, Regina
- 1989 Galerie Elca London, Montreal
- 1990 Gallery One, Toronto
- 1991 Art Placement, Saskatoon
- 1992 Assinboia Gallery, Regina
- 1993 Art Placement, Saskatoon
- 1994 Art Placement, Saskatoon
- 1995 Canadian Art Galleries, Calgary
- 1996 Costin & Klintworth, Toronto
- 2007 Art Placement, Saskatoon

== Sources ==
- Deadman, Patricia (2014). "MULCASTER, WYNONA". Encyclopedia of Saskatchewan. Canadian Plains Research Center.
- "Henry Bonli Obituary". The Star Phoenix. May 21, 2011.
- Lerner, Loren R.; Williamson, Mary F. (January 1, 1991). Art and Architecture in Canada: A Bibliography and Guide to the Literature. University of Toronto Press. ISBN 978-0-8020-5856-0.
- Nasgaard, Roald (2008). Abstract Painting in Canada. Douglas & McIntyre. ISBN 978-1-55365-394-3.
- Pearse, Harold (January 1, 2006). From Drawing to Visual Culture: A History of Art Education in Canada. McGill-Queen's Press - MQUP. ISBN 978-0-7735-6021-5.
- "Wynona Croft Mulcaster". Saskatchewan Arts Board. Archived from the original on August 8, 2014.
- "Wynona Mulcaster". Prairie Gold: Sports Heroes From Saskatchewan. Saskatoon Public Library. Archived from the original on August 8, 2014.
- "Wynona Mulcaster". Saskatchewan NAC.
- "Wynona Mulcaster". The GALLERY / art placement.
