= Augustus Kenderdine =

English painter (1870–1947)

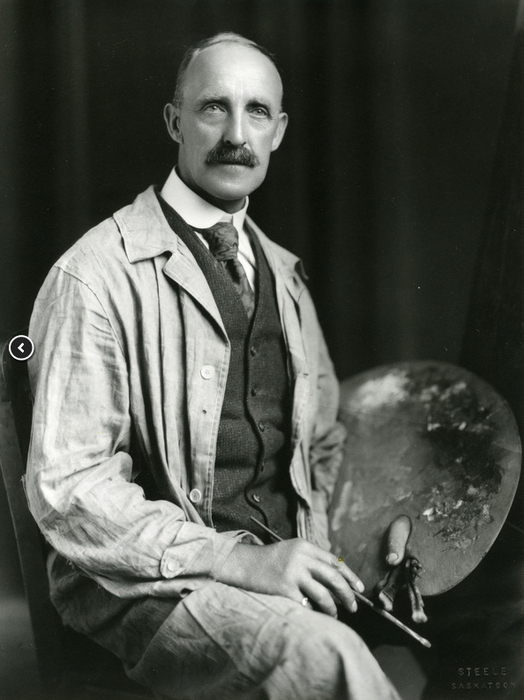
- Augustus Kenderdine, c. 1937
- Born: Augustus Frederick Lafosse Kenderdine; 31 March 1870; Chorlton-upon-Medlock, Lancashire, England
- Died: 3 August 1947 (aged 77); Regina, Saskatchewan, Canada
- Education: Manchester School of Art, Académie Julian, Paris
- Known for: Painter

Augustus Frederick Lafosse (Gus) Kenderdine (1870–1947) was a landscape and portrait artist of Lancashire and Saskatchewan, a farmer of Saskatchewan, and academic at the University of Saskatchewan.

== England ==
Kenderdine was born the seventh of twelve children to Richard and Annie Kenderdine on 31 March 1870 at Chorlton-upon-Medlock in Lancashire, and subsequently christened at the Manchester Cathedral on 23 April 1870. He first studied art with his godfather, Chevalier de la Fosse, a Belgian-born painter and photographer, at the Manchester School of Art, now part of the Manchester Metropolitan University. Subsequently, he was apprenticed to several local artists before establishing the business of "Gus Kenderdine: Photographer and Art Dealer" in 1890.

From 1890 to 1891, Kenderdine studied with Jules Lefèbvre at the Académie Julian in Paris, and his work was subsequently displayed at the Paris Salon.

On returning to England, Kenderdine joined the Blackpool Sketching Club, now known as the Blackpool Art Society, in 1891, and was a prolific exhibitor at their annual exhibitions and an occasional committee member. He displayed many oils and an occasional charcoal and chalk of landscapes around the Lake District, along the River Wyre and the local Lancastrian coastline and countryside. He also displayed a number of life, head and group studies, and in 1901 and 1902 several of his paintings were hung at the Royal Academy's Annual Summer Exhibition.

In 1894, Kenderdine married Jane Ormerod at Garstang, where he had been painting, and they subsequently had four children.

== Saskatchewan ==
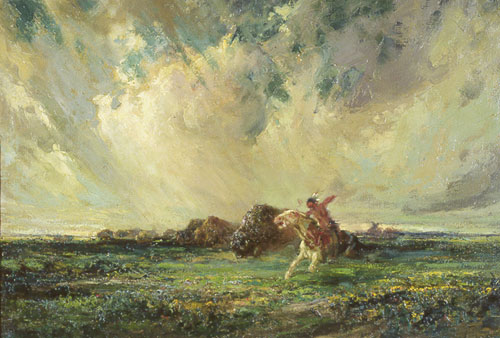
The Buffalo Hunt (1915), Mackenzie Art Gallery

In 1908, the stories of the Barr Colonists and their Utopian settlement of Brittania, now known as Lloydminster, inspired Kenderdine to emigrate with his family to the Province of Saskatchewan in Canada, where he homesteaded near Lashburn. For the next decade he was preoccupied by the rigors of farming and ranching, before turning his farming operations over to his son, and returning to his painting.

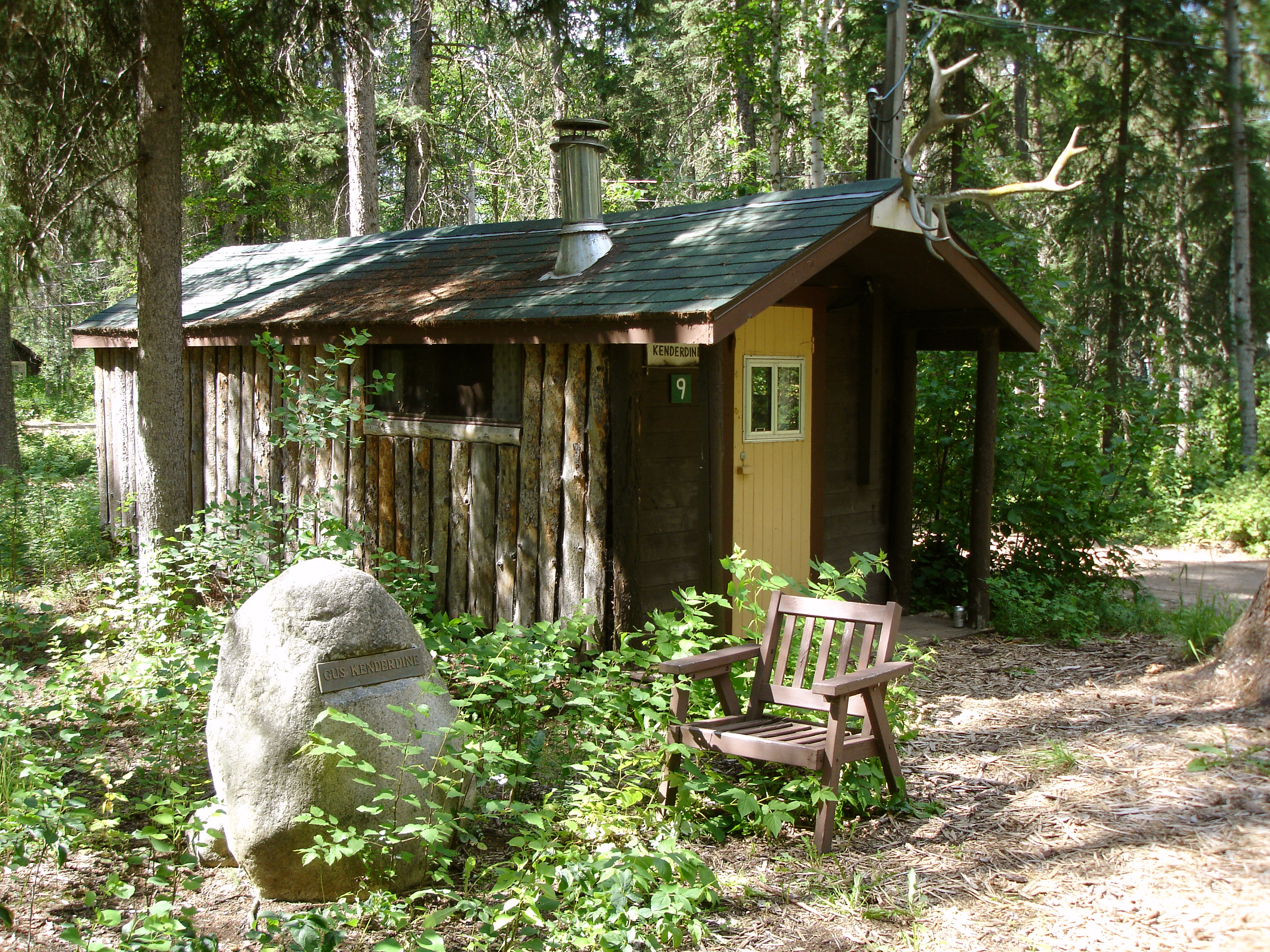
The first cabin Gus Kenderdine built on the Emma Lake site

Kenderdine secured several portrait commissions, and in subsequent years exhibited his work across Canada, but was best known in Saskatchewan. He seldom painted in watercolour, although he did several landscape studies in charcoal and wash in a style reminiscent of Gainsborough. His sweeping romantic depictions of the Saskatchewan landscape, especially around Emma Lake, Saskatchewan, were indelibly marked by his training in England and France. His imagery recast the province's topography in the comforting image of Europe. As a teacher he influenced generations of landscape painters, among them Wynona Mulcaster, Reta Cowley and Dorothy Knowles.

In 1920, Kenderdine met Walter Charles Murray, the first president of the University of Saskatchewan, who wanted to establish an art program. He provided studio space in the Physics Building on the Saskatoon Campus, where Kenderdine could work and teach. In the 1926–1927 term, Kenderdine began to teach non-credit classes which, by 1933, had become credit classes. In 1936, he established the Murray Point Art School at Murray Point on Emma Lake, which became the University Art Camp which was the forerunner of the Emma Lake Artists' Workshops which became the genesis of the Emma Lake Kenderdine Campus which was named in his honour. Kenderdine's passion for the "wilderness" of northern Saskatchewan, and his enthusiasm for attracting people to his summer art camps, corresponded with the beginnings of the local tourist industry.

Also in 1936, a School of Fine Art was established at Regina College, now the Regina Conservatory of Music, by Norman Mackenzie, who, as part of his bequest, appointed Kenderdine as the School's first head and curator of the gallery, which he held until his death in Regina on 3 August 1947.

== Legacy ==
In 1991, the University of Saskatchewan named the Kenderdine Art Gallery in his honour, thanks to a bequest by his daughter, May Beamish. His works can also be seen in the Glenbow Museum in Calgary, the MacKenzie Art Gallery in Regina, the Mendel Art Gallery in Saskatoon and the National Gallery of Canada in Ottawa.

== Sources ==
- Kenderdine, Augustus (1870-1947), The Encyclopedia of Saskatchewan
- Augustus Kenderdine 1870–1947, by Keith Bell, University of Saskatchewan, Saskatoon 1991.
- The Blackpool Times
  - 25 November 1891, page 5e&f
  - 30 November 1892, page 8f-g
  - 21 November 1894, page 5h
  - 28 November 1894, page 5d-e
  - 4 March 1896, page 6e-f
  - 18 March 1896, page 7i
  - 8 November 1899, page 4h
  - 23 April 1902, page 4h
- Gazette and News for Blackpool, Fleetwood, Lytham, St. Annes, Poulton and the Fylde District
  - 5 November 1897, page 8e&f
  - 6 November 1897, page 5b-f
  - 31 January 1899, page 3e
- The Blackpool Herald
  - 1 January 1886, page 8e
  - 3 December 1901, page 5b-c
- The Blackpool Times and Fylde Observer
  - 4 December 1901, page 5f&g
