= Ivan Eyre =

Canadian artist (1935–2022)

Ivan Kenneth Eyre
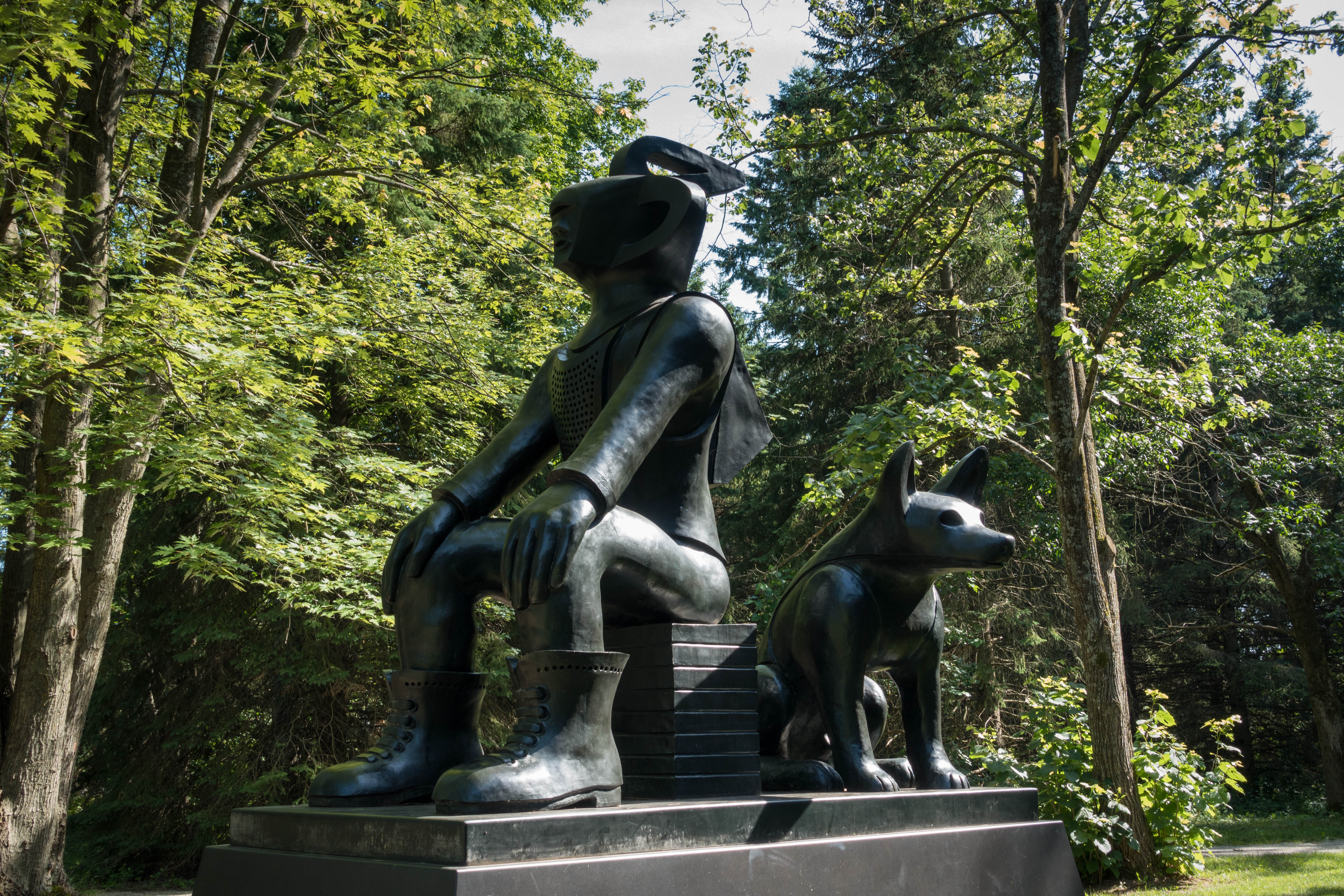
- North Watch, sculpture, 2010
- Born: 15 April 1935; Tullymet, Saskatchewan, Canada
- Died: 5 November 2022 (aged 87); Winnipeg, Manitoba, Canada
- Known for: Painter, Sculptor, Graphic artist

Ivan Kenneth Eyre CM OM RCA (15 April 1935 – 5 November 2022) was a Canadian artist best known for his prairie landscapes and compositionally abstract, figurative paintings. In addition, Eyre was a Professor Emeritus of painting and drawing at the University of Manitoba where he taught for 33 years, from 1959 until his retirement in 1992. He has been described as a "visual philosopher" and "a true outsider and visionary".

Ivan Eyre's paintings and drawings have been exhibited internationally and are featured in numerous galleries across Canada. His sculptures are prominently displayed at Assiniboine Park and the McMichael sculpture garden in Kleinburg, Ontario.

== Biography ==
Ivan Eyre was born to Thomas and Katie Eyre in Tullymet, Saskatchewan, in 1935. Eyre began school at the age of five, during which time his family relocated twice: first to Southey in 1940, then again to Ituna in 1941. Shortly thereafter, Katie and her three children left their rural environment and moved to urban Saskatoon while Thomas Eyre worked abroad as an Air Force electrician.

Eyre developed an artistic interest at an early age. At the age of 15, while still a high school student, he began taking after-school art lessons at the Saskatoon Technical Collegiate where he studied under Ernest Lindner for the duration of 1950–1953. According to Eyre: "Knowing that there was somebody seriously committed to art, somebody who had made it his life's work, was encouraging. [Lindner's] influence in this regard was important."

Eyre went on to attend evening classes at the University of Saskatchewan which were taught by Eli Bornstein in his final year of high school.

In 1953, Eyre moved to Winnipeg where he attended the University of Manitoba School of Art, graduating in 1957 with a BA in fine arts. In his autobiography, Eyre reminisces about the tutelage of his professors and class trips to the Chicago Art Institute. He was a pupil of artists Wynona Mulcaster and George Swinton. During his schooling as an undergraduate, Eyre exhibited several works at the Winnipeg Art Gallery, winning the attention and support of then gallery director, Ferdinand Eckhardt. Eyre received the Winnipeg Art Gallery Scholarship for his achievements in 1956. Around the time of his graduation, he married Brenda Yvonne Fenske, a peer student at the university.

Eyre continued on to the University of North Dakota, Grand Forks, in 1958–59 as a master's candidate where he both studied and taught as a graduate assistant. He completed several sculptural projects, among them his "first wooden head" which is currently stored in a private collection in Ottawa. The American art scene was in full swing and Eyre's paintings became open to influences from such artists like Willem de Kooning, Arshile Gorky, Joan Miró, and Max Beckmann.

=== Professorship ===
Due to financial difficulties, Eyre and his wife returned to Winnipeg in 1959 where he was hired on a part-time basis by the University of Manitoba's School of Art. For one year, Eyre taught painting and drawing to students in Brandon and Neepawa as part of the university's extension course program. In 1960, Eyre became a full-time instructor, a position he would hold until his retirement in 1992.

Eyre began developing his individualistic style during this period. Eyre remembers that around 1960–1962, "I began to reevaluate my work and decided to begin afresh....I worked at ridding myself of all influences."

In 1966, the Canada Council provided Eyre with a Canada Council Senior Arts Grant which allowed him and his family to spend a year and four months in Europe. Upon his return, Eyre wrote a report for the Canada Council of his experiences, criticizing "what was, for the most part, being hailed in the major centres as 'breakthroughs' in paintings."

At Eckhardt's recommendation, Eyre's work was selected for an exhibition at the Frankfurter Kunstkabinett in 1973 and entered the German art world with great success.

== Work ==
Working primarily in oil and acrylic mediums, Eyre's figurative paintings and still lifes tend to be spatially complex, his landscapes large and panoramic. Canadian art historian Joan Murray commented on the expressiveness of Eyre's work, noting that Eyre's corpus reflects the artist's imagination, memories, and perceptions of the world. Eyre's subjects and approaches are versatile and prone to mutability. Murray also claimed that Eyre's art "has, to a degree unusual in Canadian art: a pervading sense of stillness and calm." James D. Campbell remarked on Eyre's "existential sensibility" by pointing to the dark and violent undercurrents in Eyre's thematic reinterpretations of the world. About the paintings emanating an unsettling quality, Eyre said: "...underneath the surface ...there is still that mood underground...I'm trying to make a better painting, and by that I mean a painting that will satisfy as many levels of experience as possible".

Eyre rejects the notion of "schools" or "movements", whether coined as such by art historians or artists. Prioritizing the concept of artist-as-individual-creator above all else, Eyre has criticized movements such as the avant garde for restricting the creative capabilities of artists who fall under their umbrella and binding their adherents to a specific style or direction.

In 1974, the Winnipeg Art Gallery purchased Eyre's 1973 painting Tanglewood for a record-breaking price never before paid for the work of a Manitoba artist. Today, a typical Eyre painting has an auction value of approximately $30,000 to upwards of $300,000.

== Ivan Eyre Gallery ==
The third floor of the Assiniboine Park pavilion museum in Winnipeg, Manitoba is named for Ivan Eyre who is one of several Manitoban artists (including Walter J. Phillips and Clarence Tillenius) honored and exhibited at the pavilion. The WAG @ The Park initiative launched in fall of 2016 upon completion of renovations due to moisture and roof leaks. In collaboration with the Assiniboine conservancy, the Winnipeg Art Gallery agreed to curate free exhibitions in the revamped space using only works by Eyre, Phillips, and Tillenius.

The Assiniboine Park conservancy houses Canada's largest collection of Eyre's art, made possible by Eyre's donation of 200 paintings, 5000 drawings, and 16 sculptures to the park. The current exhibition is titled "Wasteland Dreamland: Early Works by Ivan Eyre, 1957-1969."

== Honours ==
- 1974: Royal Canadian Academy of Arts, elected member elect
- 1977: Queen Elizabeth II's Silver Jubilee Medal
- 1982: University of Manitoba Alumni Jubilee award
- 2002: Queen Elizabeth II's Golden Jubilee Medal
- 2007: Order of Manitoba
- 2008: honorary Doctor of Laws from the University of Manitoba
- 2015: Order of Canada with the grade of member

== List of solo exhibitions ==
- 1962: The University of Manitoba, Winnipeg. Ivan Eyre Drawings (c. 5 December)
- 1964: The University of Manitoba, Winnipeg. [One-artist] (1964)
- 1964: The Montreal Museum of Fine Arts. [One-artist] (–8 March)
- 1964: The Winnipeg Art Gallery. Ivan Eyre
- 1965: Fleet Gallery, Winnipeg. Ivan Eyre (–23 February)
- 1965: Albert White Galleries, Toronto. Ivan Eyre, Winnipeg (c. 17 April – 4 May)
- 1966: Yellow Door Gallery, Winnipeg. [One-artist]
- 1966: The Winnipeg Art Gallery. Ivan Eyre Drawings (27 September – 16 October)
- 1967: Atelier Vincitore Gallery, Brighton, England. Painting, Sculpture, Drawing by Ivan Eyre (27 January – 11 February)
- 1968: Mendel Art Gallery, Saskatoon. Ivan Eyre (20 February – 25 March)
- 1969: The Morris Gallery, Toronto. [One-artist] (Spring)
- 1969: Fleet Gallery, Winnipeg. [One-artist] (c. 1 May)
- 1971: The Morris Gallery, Toronto. Ivan Eyre, New Paintings and Sculpture (27 February – 13 March)
- 1973–1974: Frankfurter Kunstkabinett, West Germany. Ivan Eyre
- 1973: Burnaby Art Gallery. Ivan Eyre: Sculpture, Paintings, Drawings (2–27 May)
- 1973: The Morris Gallery, Toronto. Ivan Eyre (5–19 May)
- 1973: Art Gallery of Greater Victoria. Drawings by Ivan Eyre (8 May – 3 June)
- 1973: McIntosh Gallery, The University of Western Ontario, London. Ivan Eyre (17 October – 18 November)
- 1974: The Winnipeg Art Gallery. Ivan Eyre: Recent Paintings and Sculpture (c. 21 March – 9 June)
- 1976: Playhouse Theatre, Fredericton/New Brunswick Museum, Saint John. Ivan Eyre, paintings (18–31 October, 5 –26 November)
- 1976: Gallery 111, School of Art, The University of Manitoba. Ivan Eyre: Recent Paintings and Sculpture (c. 21 March – 9 June)
- 1978: The National Gallery of Canada. Ivan Eyre Drawings
- 1979: Mira Godard Gallery, Calgary. Ivan Eyre (26 October – 17 November)
- 2017: The Winnipeg Art Gallery. Ivan Eyre: Landscapes and Still Lifes (15 September – 29 October)

== Posthumous exhibitions ==
- 2023: Winnipeg Art Gallery, The Idea of Trees: Ivan Eyre (Nov 26, 2022 - Jun 3, 2023).

== Record sale prices ==
At the Heffel Auction, Post-War & Contemporary Art, November 20, 2024, LOT 010, High Valley, acrylic on canvas, 48 x 48 in, 121.9 x 121.9 cm, Estimate: $50,000 - $70,000 CAD, Sold for: $325,250 (including Buyer's Premium).
