= Otto Rogers =

Canadian painter and sculptor (1935–2019)

Otto Donald Rogers
- Born: November 19, 1935; Kerrobert, Saskatchewan, Canada
- Died: April 28, 2019 (aged 83)
- Occupation: Painter

Otto Donald Rogers RCA (19 November 1935 – 28 April 2019) was a Canadian painter and sculptor from rural Saskatchewan whose abstract works reflects his Baháʼí Faith in unity in diversity. His work has been widely exhibited. It is held in many private and public collections in Canada and other countries.

== Early years ==
Otto Donald Rogers was born on 19 December 1935 in Kerrobert, Saskatchewan. He grew up on a farm near Kelfield, Saskatchewan. He attended high school in Kindersley, and then studied at the Saskatoon Teachers' College from 1952 to 1953. He took an art class with Wynona Mulcaster, who was impressed by his talent and encouraged Rogers to pursue a career in art. Mulcaster introduced him to cubism, a style he was to adopt for himself. Rogers attended the University of Wisconsin–Madison from 1954 to 1959. In 1955 he obtained a scholarship from the Saskatchewan Arts Board that let him attend the Emma Lake Artists' Workshop led by Jack Shadbolt. He obtained a BSc in Art Education in 1958 and an MSc in Fine Art in 1959.

== Later career ==
After graduating from university Rogers spent a few months in New York City. He then joined the faculty of the arts department of the University of Saskatchewan, where he taught from 1959 to 1988. His student Robert Christie remembers Rogers as a charismatic teacher. He and the structurist Eli Bornstein dominated the department. Another student said he was "a fantastic mentor, a task master with very high standards." He helped rejuvenate the Emma Lake Artist's Workshops between 1971 and 1987. In the early 1970s Rogers spent three months working in Iceland. In 1973 he became a member of the Royal Canadian Academy of Arts. From 1973 to 1978 Rogers was head of the university's art department. The sculptor Anthony Caro asked Rogers to participate in his Triangle workshop in New York in 1984, and in a second Triangle workshop in Barcelona in 1987. The Barcelona Museum of Contemporary Art purchased three of Rogers' sculptural reliefs.

In 1959 Rogers married Barbara Nelson, who brought him to the Baháʼí Faith. He became a member of the Canadian Baháʼí community in 1960. Rogers became a leader in Baháʼí activities in Saskatchewan, and held increasingly senior positions in the organization of this religion. In 1988 Rogers left the University of Saskatchewan and moved to Haifa, Israel, where for ten years he was a Counselor member of the International Teaching Centre at the Baháʼí World Centre. While based in Israel he visited Russia and met previously banned abstract artists. He was conducted through the vaults of the Hermitage in Saint Petersburg, where he saw the works of artists such as Wassily Kandinsky and Kazimir Malevich.

In 1998 Rogers returned to Canada and settled in Milford in Prince Edward County, Ontario. His studio there was designed by his son-in-law Siamak Hariri, an architect, who is married to his daughter Sasha Rogers. She is also a painter.

The passing of Donald Rogers was announced to the Baháʼí community on April 28, 2019.

== Work ==
Rogers follows the Cubist-Constructivist tradition started by Pablo Picasso, Julio González and David Smith. His early work included portraits, still lifes, landscapes and cityscapes. Later his work became increasingly abstract. He has worked in different media that range from color-field painting to assembled steel sculpture. His paintings show the influence of the prairie spaces and of his Baháʼí beliefs. Both his faith and his art reflect the central belief of unity in diversity. Clement Greenberg said of the Otto Rogers when he was a young man, that he is “an artist of amazing talent, worthy of an international reputation.” He has been given many awards for his painting, sculpture and graphic arts. Rogers' work is held in public and private collections in several countries. These include:

- Art Gallery of Ontario, Toronto, Canada
- MacKenzie Art Gallery, Regina, Canada
- Mendel Art Gallery, Saskatoon, Canada
- Montreal Museum of Fine Arts, Montreal, Canada
- Musée national des beaux-arts du Québec, Quebec City, Canada
- Museum of Contemporary Art, Barcelona, Spain
- Museum of Fine Arts, Boston, U.S.
- National Gallery of Canada, Ottawa, Canada
- Canada Council for the Arts' Art Bank, Ottawa, Canada
- National Gallery of Iceland, Reykjavík, Iceland
- Bank of Montreal, Canada
- General Foods, Canada
- Scotiabank, Canada

== Sources ==
- Carpenter, Ken (2014-04-28). "Otto Rogers and a Life in Art". Canadian Art.
- Ivanochko, Bob (2014). "ROGERS, OTTO DONALD (1935–)". The Encyclopedia of Saskatchewan. University of Regina.
- Nasgaard, Roald (2008). Abstract Painting in Canada. Douglas & McIntyre. ISBN 978-1-55365-394-3.
- "Otto Donald Rogers". Baháʼí Community of Canada.
- "Otto Donald Rogers". Radius Books.
- "Otto Rogers bio". Gallery Jones Fine Arts.
- "Otto Rogers". Mira Godard Gallery.
- "Otto Rogers". Paul Kuhn Gallery.
- Zepp, Normal (2011-09-14). "Otto Donald Rogers". The Canadian Encyclopedia. Toronto: Historica Canada.
