= Douglas Bentham =

Canadian artist (born 1947)

- Born: 1947; Rosetown, Saskatchewan
- Died: 2026 (aged 78–79); Saskatoon, Saskatchewan
- Education: B.F.A. (Painting), University of Saskatchewan, SK (1969); M.F.A. (Sculpture), University of Saskatchewan, SK (1989)
- Awards: member in 1976, Royal Canadian Academy; Lynch-Staunton Award, Canada Council (1980)

Douglas Bentham RCA (born 1947) has been since the late 1960s, acknowledged as one of Canada's pre-eminent producer of large-scale welded steel sculpture.

== Career ==
Bentham was born in Rosetown, Saskatchewan but moved with his family to Saskatoon in 1959. He originally graduated from the University of Saskatchewan with a fine arts degree in painting, but was interested in sculpture by working with the American sculptor Michael Steiner at an Emma Lake Artists' Workshop in 1969. In 1977, Bentham worked as co-leader in a workshop with Sir Anthony Caro at an Emma Lake Artists' Workshop as Caro made a series of 15 sculptures, in which he combined found materials with steel tubing and beams. He went back to school in 1989 to get his master's degree in sculpting and credits his father, who worked as a mechanic, as the driving force behind his interest in sculpting with metal.

Bentham lives and works in his studio on an acreage near Dundurn, Saskatchewan.

== Selected exhibitions ==
Bentham has had over fifty solo exhibitions across Canada, notably a national travelling exhibition organized by the Art Gallery of York University, Toronto, Ontario, in 1975, and a twelve-year retrospective exhibition at the MacKenzie Art Gallery, Regina, Saskatchewan, in 1980. The Mendel Art Gallery, in his home city of Saskatoon, presented a major exhibition of his work, "Resonance", in 2004. Bentham's first installation, The Tablets, consisting of 27 pedestal-scaled sculptures displayed on identical plinths was exhibited in five western Canadian public galleries from 2016 to 2018. Installed in symmetrical rows, the collection of metal assemblages of textured bronze and brass panels infused with fractured text, numbers and dates contributed to a narrative about time. More recently, small-scale sculptures in brass and bronze were displayed at the Nicholas Metivier Gallery, Toronto, Ontario, which represents him, in 2019 as does Mann Gallery in St. Catharines in 2023.

Bentham has participated in over one hundred group shows throughout his career, both here and abroad.

== Commissions ==
Bentham's commissioned works are in many outdoor settings across Canada. Particularly well-known is his stainless steel sculpture, Unfurled (2006), in Saskatoon, Saskatchewan, cited at the foot of University Bridge. One author believes that its lightness and openness reflects the expansiveness of the prairie landscape but, as another author said of a Bentham work, it presents endless opportunities for interpretation. The painted steel sculpture Garland (2008), installed at Durham College (DC) and the University of Ontario Institute of Technology (UOIT) on the north Oshawa campus, although not specifically commissioned for the location, has a spiraling motion that gives the appearance of upward movement suitable to its original intention as a design for a Spirit of Youth competition in Saskatoon, and to its Oshawa location as well. In 2015, Bentham won a national competition for Skater’s Arch, a monumental circular structure in painted steel for Rogers Place Arena, Edmonton, Alberta. He was commissioned to execute a large-scale wall sculpture, Nine Planes X Full Flight, in painted galvanized steel which he installed at Royal View Plaza, Calgary, Alberta, in 2016.

== Selected collections ==
Bentham's sculptures are included in public collections throughout Canada, and significantly, in the Remai Modern in Saskatoon.

== Workshops and groups ==
Bentham has contributed to many international artists' workshops throughout his career, including the Emma Lake Artists' Workshop, Saskatchewan (1977); the Triangle Workshop, Pine Plains, New York; and the Hardingham Sculpture Workshop, UK.

He co-founded Canadian Artists' Representation (now known as CARFAC) in Saskatchewan.

== Awards ==
- 1980 Victor Martyn Lynch-Staunton Award from the Canada Council.
