= William Perehudoff =

Canadian artist (1918–2013)

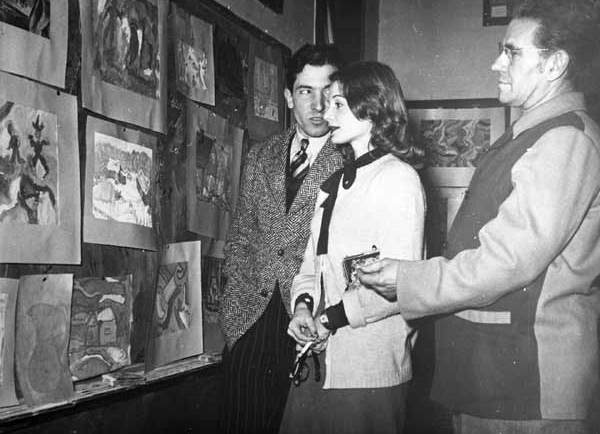
- Saskatoon artists (left) William Perehudoff and Ernest Lindner with Eva Mendel Miller viewing an art exhibition (possibly children's art) in Langham, Sask.
- Born: William Perehudoff; April 21, 1918; Saskatoon, Saskatchewan
- Died: February 26, 2013 (aged 94); Saskatoon, Saskatchewan
- Education: Colorado Springs Fine Arts Center, Amédée Ozenfant, Emma Lake Artists' Workshops
- Known for: Painter, muralist
- Movement: Colour Field painting
- Spouse: Dorothy Knowles
- Awards: Order of Canada, Saskatchewan Order of Merit, Queen Elizabeth II Diamond Jubilee Medal
- Patrons: Fred Mendel

William Perehudoff CM SOM RCA (April 21, 1918 – February 26, 2013) was a Canadian artist closely associated with colour field painting. He was married to the landscape painter Dorothy Knowles.

== Life and career ==
Perehudoff was born in St. Paul's Hospital in Saskatoon, Saskatchewan, on April 21, 1918, and was raised on a farm in the Doukhobor community of Bogdanovka, between the towns of Langham and Borden, Saskatchewan. His formal education ended at grade eleven, but he pursued art studies with French artist Jean Chariot at the Colorado Springs Fine Arts Center, Colorado (1948–1949), with Amédée Ozenfant at the Ozenfant School of Fine Arts, New York, New York (1949–1950) and through the Emma Lake Artists' Workshops (various years, 1957 to 1990), where he became acquainted with teachers Kenneth Noland and Jules Olitski. It was at a workshop in 1962 that he met New York art critic Clement Greenberg, who introduced him to Post-painterly Abstraction, which had an enormous impact upon his art and career.

Perehudoff became acquainted with Jack Bush at the suggestion of Kenneth Noland in the mid 1960s. He regularly visited Bush thereafter and felt an affinity for the way Bush worked in commercial art to support his family, as did Perehudoff.

Perehudoff's work has been represented in numerous public and private collections, including the National Gallery of Canada, Remai Modern in Saskatoon, the Canada Council Art Bank, the Glenbow Museum in Calgary, the Art Gallery of Ontario, and the Montreal Museum of Fine Art.

In 1994, he was awarded the Saskatchewan Order of Merit, and in 1999, he was inducted as a Member of the Order of Canada. He was made a member of the Royal Canadian Academy of Arts. Due to failing eyesight, Perehudoff gave up painting around 2003–2004.

In November 2009, several of Perehudoff's murals were successfully removed from the executive suite in the former Intercontinental Packers plant. Perehudoff painted them in 1950, and the abstract silhouettes are considered the last remaining examples of purist cubist art from that period. Appraised at $250,000, the murals had been at risk as the plant was slated for demolition. Ian Hodkinson, a retired art conservator, was brought in and used a special method to remove the acrylic paint from the plaster intact. The murals remained in storage until the Remai Modern was completed in 2017. They are now displayed in a special antechamber, built to the same dimensions as the boardroom in which they first existed. In 2010, a travelling retrospective titled The Optimism of Colour: William Perehudoff was curated by Karen Wilkin for Saskatoon’s Mendel Art Gallery.

Perehudoff died on February 26, 2013, at age 94.
