= Ernest Lindner =

Canadian artist (1897-1988)

Ernst Friedrich Lindner
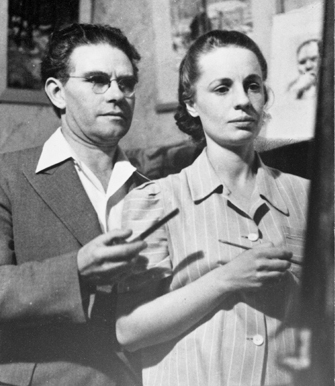
- Ernest Lindner and wife Bodil in December 1942
- Born: 1 May 1897; Vienna, Austria
- Died: 4 November 1988 (aged 91); Saskatoon, Saskatchewan, Canada
- Known for: painter

Ernst Friedrich Lindner OC RCA LL. D. (1 May 1897 – 4 November 1988) was an Austrian-born Canadian painter. He moved to Saskatoon, Saskatchewan, in 1926, where became a self-taught commercial artist. He soon was recognized locally and then nationally and was active in several art organizations. He is known for his meticulous watercolors of natural woodlands depicting the cycle of decay and regeneration.

== Early years ==
Ernst Friedrich Lindner was born in Vienna, Austria. He was the thirteenth child of a German family. His father Karl Oswald Lindner (1844–1919) ran a business that made stylish canes and parasol handles, and employed almost 300 craftsmen. Ernst caught diphtheria as a child of seven, and drew and painted during his long convalescence. During World War I (1914–1918) Lindner volunteered in 1915 to join a mountaineer regiment of the Austrian army. He was wounded, but recovered and was back in service before the end of the war. After the war he worked as a bank clerk in Innsbruck, Austria. He also helped in the family firm and engaged in a mineral water and sugar confectionery company with his brother Paul that failed.

1921 he married Hertha Liebenberger. One year later, their only son Herbert (1922–1995) was born. In order to collect money for his trip to Canada, he obtained expensive cameras per delivery note and cashed them in a pawn shop. His siblings had to buy the cameras back and return them to the camera shop. From the train window of a train departing to London, he informed his wife Hertha that he would not return. He boarded the ship "Melitta" from Antwerp to Canada, where he arrived with only $5 in his pocket.

== Artistic career ==
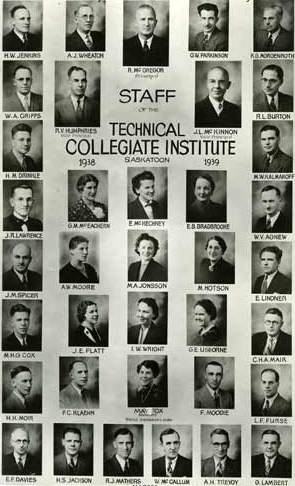
Technical Collegiate Staff 1938–39 — Lindner to the center right

In 1926 Lindner immigrated to Canada and settled in Saskatoon, Saskatchewan. At first Lindner found work as a farm laborer. He attended night classes at the University of Saskatchewan under Augustus Kenderdine. He became a freelance commercial artist and illustrator, largely self-taught. He had become recognized as an artist in Saskatchewan by 1931, and by 1933 was starting to exhibit in eastern Canada. Lindner began to teach at the Saskatoon Technical Collegiate in 1931, first giving a night course and then became a full-time instructor. He headed the Art Department at the Collegiate from 1936 until 1962.

Lindner was very active in the arts community. He started a weekly discussion group called "Saturday Nights" that met in the private homes of local artists, often in his own home. He was a member of the Prospectors, the first society of professional artists in the province. He became president of the Saskatoon Art Association. When the Federation of Canadian Artists was formed in 1941, Lindner was made responsible for the Saskatchewan region. He was one of the first members of the Saskatchewan Arts Board.

It was through the influence of Lindner and Kenderdine that the University of Saskatchewan began to run its annual Emma Lake Artists' Workshops. Lindner participated in these workshops in 1955–1957, 1960–1964 and 1966. Some of the prominent Modernist painters of New York were guests at the Emma Lake Workshops in the late 1950s and early 1960s, and influenced Lindner's style. The formalist Jules Olitski, known for his color-field abstractions, was a significant influence. In 1959 Lindner returned to Vienna and attended the Akademie der Angewandten Kunst, where he took a master's course in etching and stone lithography.

In 1962 Lindner left the Technical Collegiate and devoted himself to art for the remainder of his life. Ernest Lindner died in Saskatoon on 4 November 1988, aged 91. The Ernest Lindner Park is the Erindale suburb of Saskatoon in named in his honour.

== Work ==
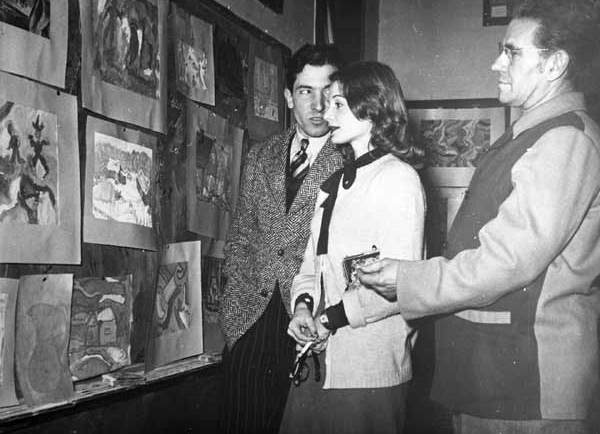
William Perehudoff, Eva Mendel Miller and Lindner in Langham, Sask, January 1947

Lindner is known for his many watercolors inspired by the natural beauty of the wooded country around his summer home at Emma Lake. He also made etchings, lithographs, linocuts and wood block prints. Lindner has been called a Late Modernist and also a Magic Realist.

He depicted the forest floor from close quarters, with highly textured patterns of surface detail from the fallen branches, tree stumps, moss and lichen. His paintings of weathered tree stumps in the 1940s and 1950s were influenced by the symbolism of the Group of Seven. His work reveals a fascination with the natural cycle of decay and regeneration. His watercolors of the tangled forest interior were sharply focused, highly keyed and executed with great skill. In his later work human and plant forms often overlap and blend into each other.

Clement Greenberg conducted an Emma Lake Artists' Workshop in 1962 in which Lindner participated. Greenberg wrote in an introduction to an exhibition of Linder's work in Regina in 1962–1963,

Lindner's art excels by the truth of its color as well as of its drawing and design. And by truth of color his art points forward, transcending every note of quaintness. For, as I see it, the present and future of pictorial art belong to color in a fuller sense than heretofore. And it doesn't matter whether the color is abstract or descriptive. I want to emphasize that. I find more imagination and modernity in Ernest Lindner's sharply focused rendering of a tree trunk than in the largest part of current abstract painting.

Lindner's work was widely exhibited in Canada and was also shown at the Canada House Gallery in London, England, and the Canadian Cultural centers in Paris and Brussels. His work is held in many important public or private collections. Examples are held in the National Gallery of Canada in Ottawa, the Glenbow Museum in Calgary and the Winnipeg Art Gallery. The University of Saskatchewan gave him an honorary Doctor of Laws degree in 1972. He was elected a member of the Royal Canadian Academy of Arts in 1977. In 1979 he was made an Officer of the Order of Canada. Lindner's "Reminiscences of Ernest Lindner", a transcript in 1971 from an interview, is held by the Provincial Archives of Saskatchewan (formerly the Saskatchewan Archives Board).

== Studio ==
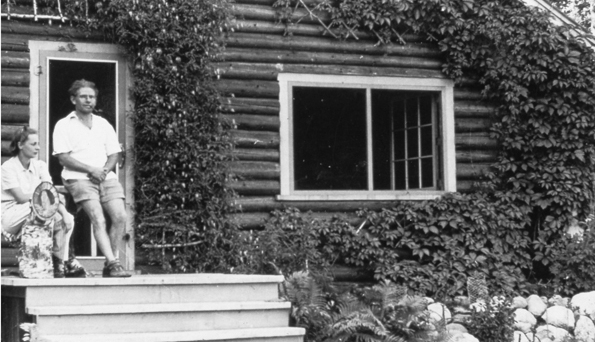
Ernest Ernest and Bodil Lindner at their cottage on Fairy Isle (August 1943)

Lindner visited Emma Lake in the summer of 1935 and stayed at Murray Point, the site of the University art school camp and later the location of the Emma Lake Artists' Workshops. Just across the lake Lindner and his wife Bodil found a densely wooded uninhabited island that they called Fairy Island. Lindner built a studio and summer cottage on the northeast shore of the island on what is now called Lindner Point. The studio was a spruce log cabin. A large corner window facing northwest gave natural light. Lindner often sat there to paint views of the landscape. Lindner sold the property to the University of Saskatchewan in 1961. It has since been used as a base of researchers into the local botany, zoology and limnology. From April 2007 the studio, surrounded by a 48 hectares (120 acres) mixed wood forest, has been recognized as a Provincial Heritage Property.

== Personal life ==
His first marriage in Austria with Hertha Liebenberger lasted from 1921 to 1936. Neither she nor their son Herbert (1922-1995) wanted to come to Canada on Lindner's several invitations.

1937 he married his student Bodil Brostrom von Degen (born 1911 in Denmark) and had a daughter Degen, born in 1943. They divorced in 1952. During his stay in Vienna 1959 he was accompanied by his daughter Degen.

He was not interested in his two grandsons Michael and Andreas (from his son Herbert) and declined their wish to visit him in Saskatoon in the 1970s. His daughter Degen has two children, his grandchildren.

== Sources ==
- Anderson, Jack (2006). "LINDNER, ERNST FRIEDRICH (1897–1988)". Encyclopedia of Saskatchewan.
- "Ernest Lindner". ARTSask.
- "Ernest Lindner". Saskatchewan NAC.
- "Ernest Lindner". Saskatchewan Council for Archives and Archivists.
- "Ernest Lindner". The GALLERY / art placement inc.
- "Ernest Lindner Studio on Fairy Island". Parks Canada. Archived from the original on 15 August 2014.
- Gouin, Judy (22 May 2008). "Ernest Lindner". The Canadian Encyclopedia. Historica Canada.
- Greenberg, Clement (1 June 1995). The Collected Essays and Criticism, Volume 4: Modernism with a Vengeance, 1957–1969. University of Chicago Press. ISBN 978-0-226-30624-7.
- Poole, Ellen (2008). "65 years of Artistic Achievement: A History of the FCA" (PDF). FCA. Archived from the original (PDF) on 20 April 2019.
- Blühberger, Günther and Irmgard (2003). Eine große Familie. Wilhelm Lindner: Mein Leben. Shaker. ISBN 3-8322-2156-5.
- Henderson, Lisa G. (17 November 2014). "Some Early Women Artists in Saskatoon". earlysaskatchewanartinthenews. Saskatchewan art history in old newspapers and on the internet.
