= University of Saskatchewan College of Agriculture and Bioresources =

Agricultural school of the University of Saskatchewan

College of Agriculture and Bioresources at the University of Saskatchewan
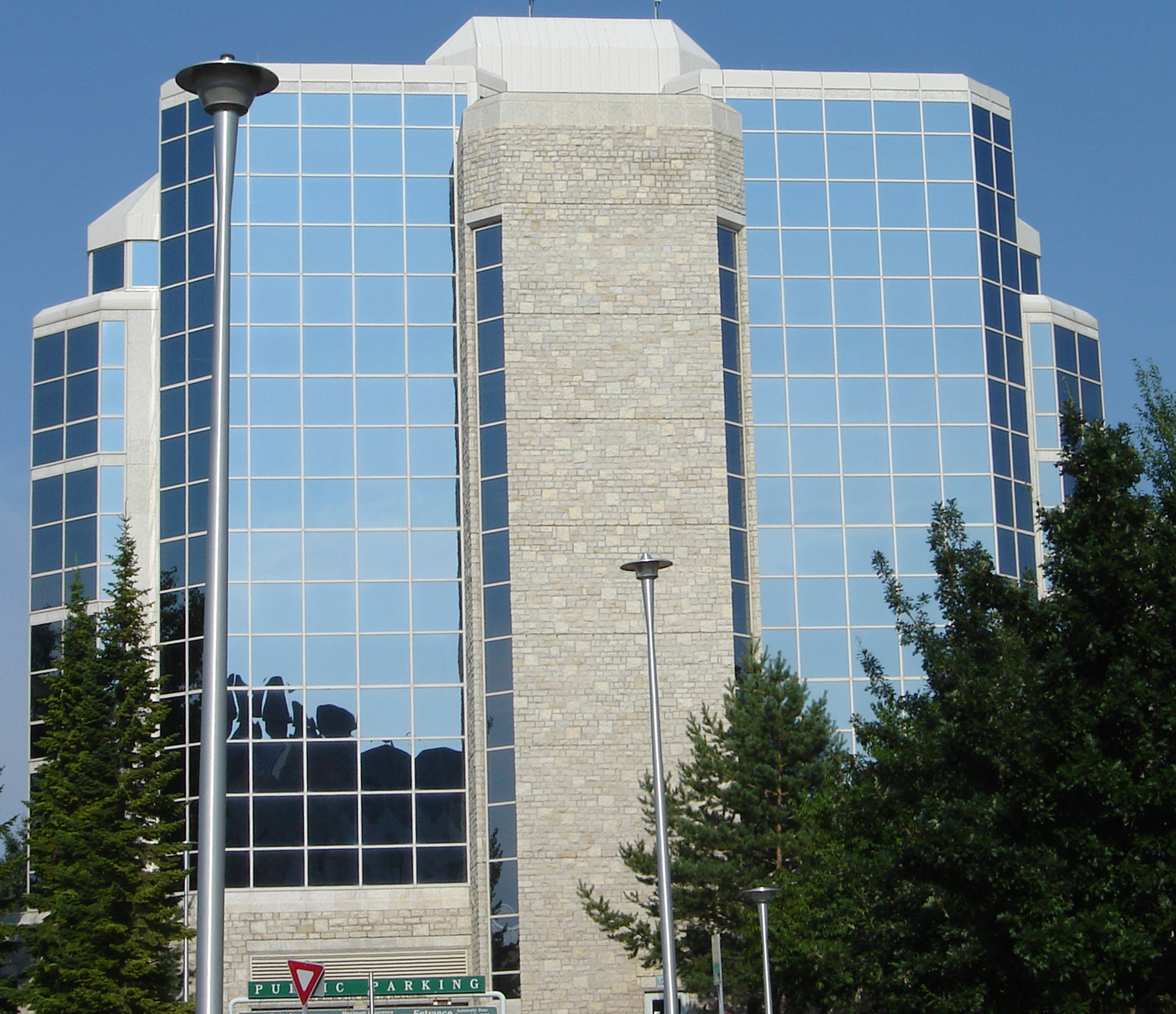
- The Agriculture and Bioresources College Building, University of Saskatchewan
- Type: Public Agricultural College at University of Saskatchewan
- Established: 1909
- Endowment: $38 M annually
- Dean: Angela Bedard-Haughn
- Administrative staff: 350 faculty, research scientists, administrative & support staff.
- Students: 1,000
- Undergraduates: diploma, degree available
- Postgraduates: postgraduate level degree available
- Doctoral students: available
- Location: 51 Campus Drive, Saskatoon, Saskatchewan, Canada; 52.1329°N 106.6317°W
- Campus: 18,000 square metres of usable space at University of Saskatchewan
- Website: www.agbio.usask.ca

The College of Agriculture and Bioresources is a faculty at the University of Saskatchewan in Saskatoon, Saskatchewan.

It has an annual budget of $38 million and an enrolment of approximately 1,000 students studying at the diploma, undergraduate degree, graduate degree and postgraduate levels. The College has approximately 350 employees, including faculty, research scientists, administrative and scientific support staff.

== History ==
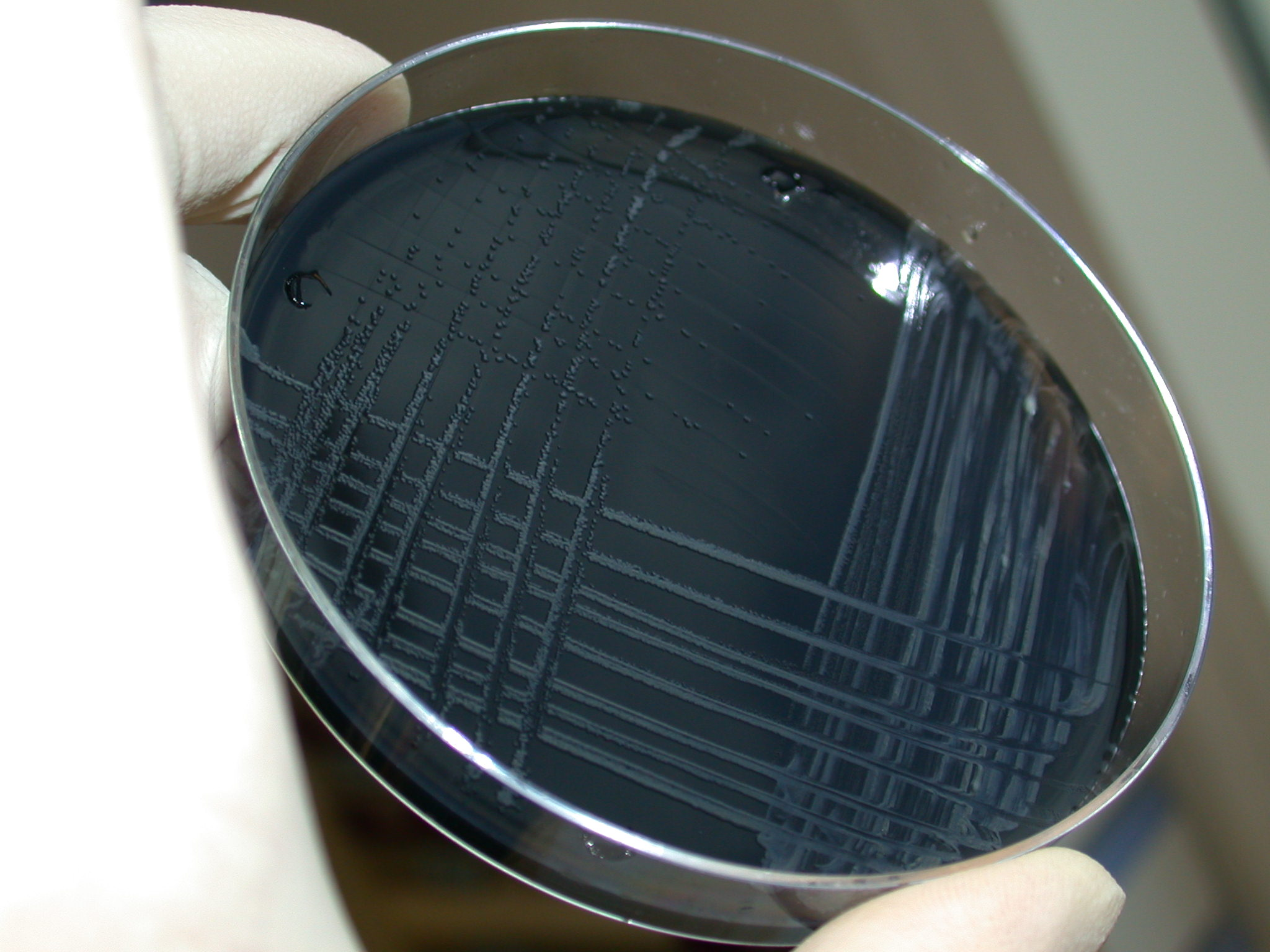
Campylobacter jejuni colonies isolated on blood-free, charcoal based selective medium University of Saskatchewan, College of Agriculture, Applied Microbiology and Food Science Department.

The University of Saskatchewan established its College of Agriculture in 1909. Between 1914 and 1922 the College teamed up with the Saskatchewan Department of Agriculture to operate the Better Farming Train throughout rural Saskatchewan.

The University Council approved a change of the name of the college to the "College of Agriculture and Bioresources" in June 2005. The newly named college held its first classes in the College Building. There were also 1,000 acres (405 ha) reserved for agriculture practice, a university barn, crops, and livestock study. The new agriculture building built between the years of 1988 and 1991 was a large six storey glass building, with a seventh floor added in the year 2000. The National Research Council contributed to the establishment of a Crop Development Centre at the University of Saskatchewan. Courses would be offered in the fields of Agricultural and Bioresource Engineering (ABE), Agricultural Economics (AGEC), Agriculture (AGRC), Agronomy (AGRN), Animal Science (ANSC), Environmental Science (EVSC), Food and Applied Microbiological Sciences (FAMS), Indigenous People Resource Management (IPRM), Large Animal Clinical Sciences (VLAC), Plant Sciences (PLSC), and Soil Science (SLSC).

== Programs ==
The Agriculture & Bioresources College programs at the University of Saskatchewan include:

- Diploma in Agriculture with Specialization in Agribusiness; Diploma in Agriculture with Specialization in Agronomy; Diploma in Agriculture with Specialization in Animal Science; Diploma in Agriculture with Specialization in General Agriculture
- Bachelor of Science in Agriculture; Bachelor of Agriculture in Animal Science; Bachelor of Agriculture in Biotechnology; Bachelor of Agriculture in Crop Science; Bachelor of Agriculture in Environmental Science; Bachelor of Agriculture in Food Science; Bachelor of Agriculture in Horticultural Science; Bachelor of Agriculture in Plant Sciences; Bachelor of Agriculture in Soil Science; Bachelor of Agriculture in Rangeland Resources
- Master of Agriculture in Agricultural Economics; Master of Agriculture in Animal and Poultry Science; Master of Agriculture in Applied Microbiology; Master of Agriculture in Biotechnology; Master of Agriculture in Food Science; Master of Agriculture in Plant Science; Master of Agriculture in Soil Science.

== Buildings and Features ==
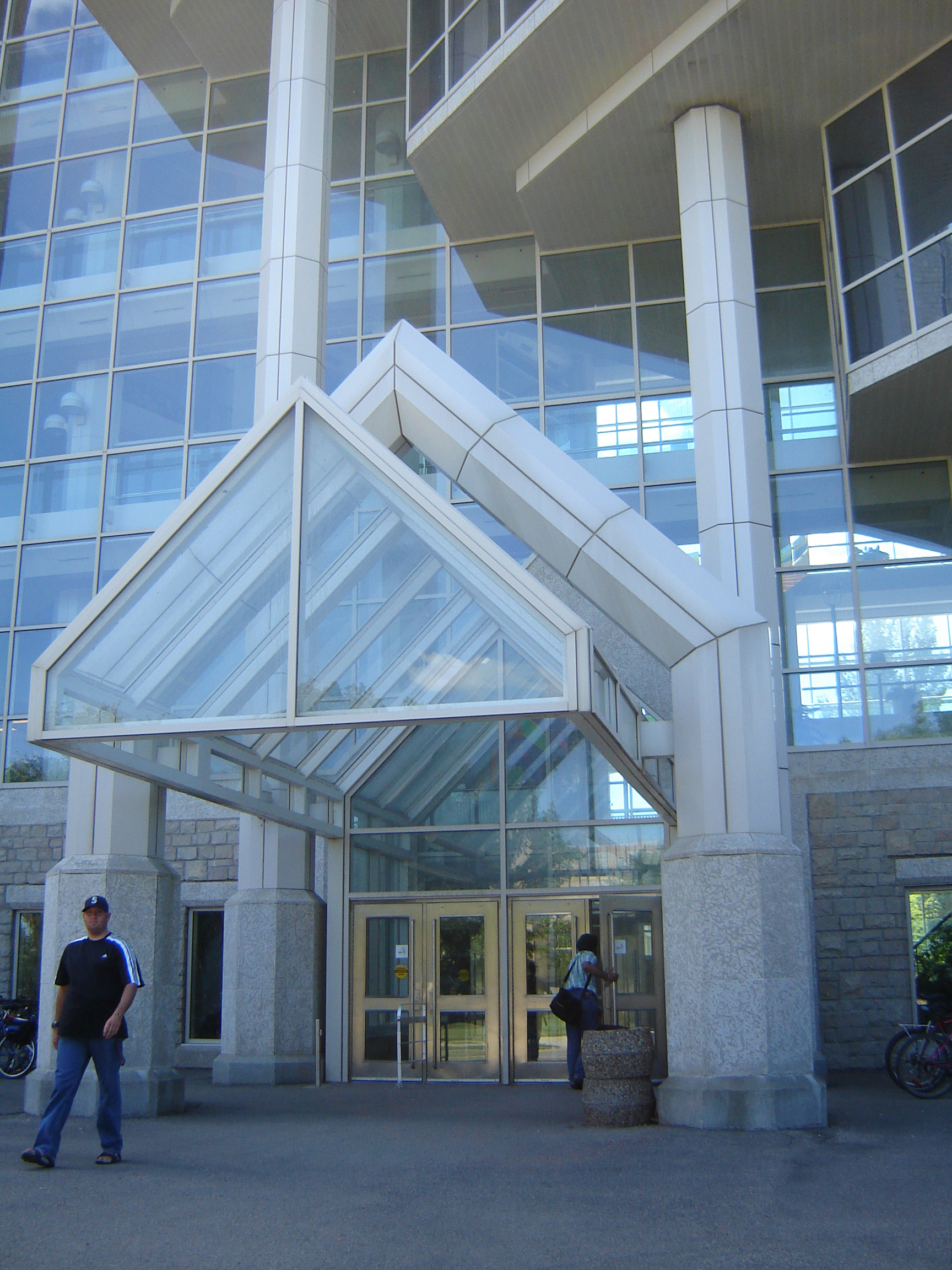
Entrance Agriculture and Bioresources College Building, University of Saskatchewan

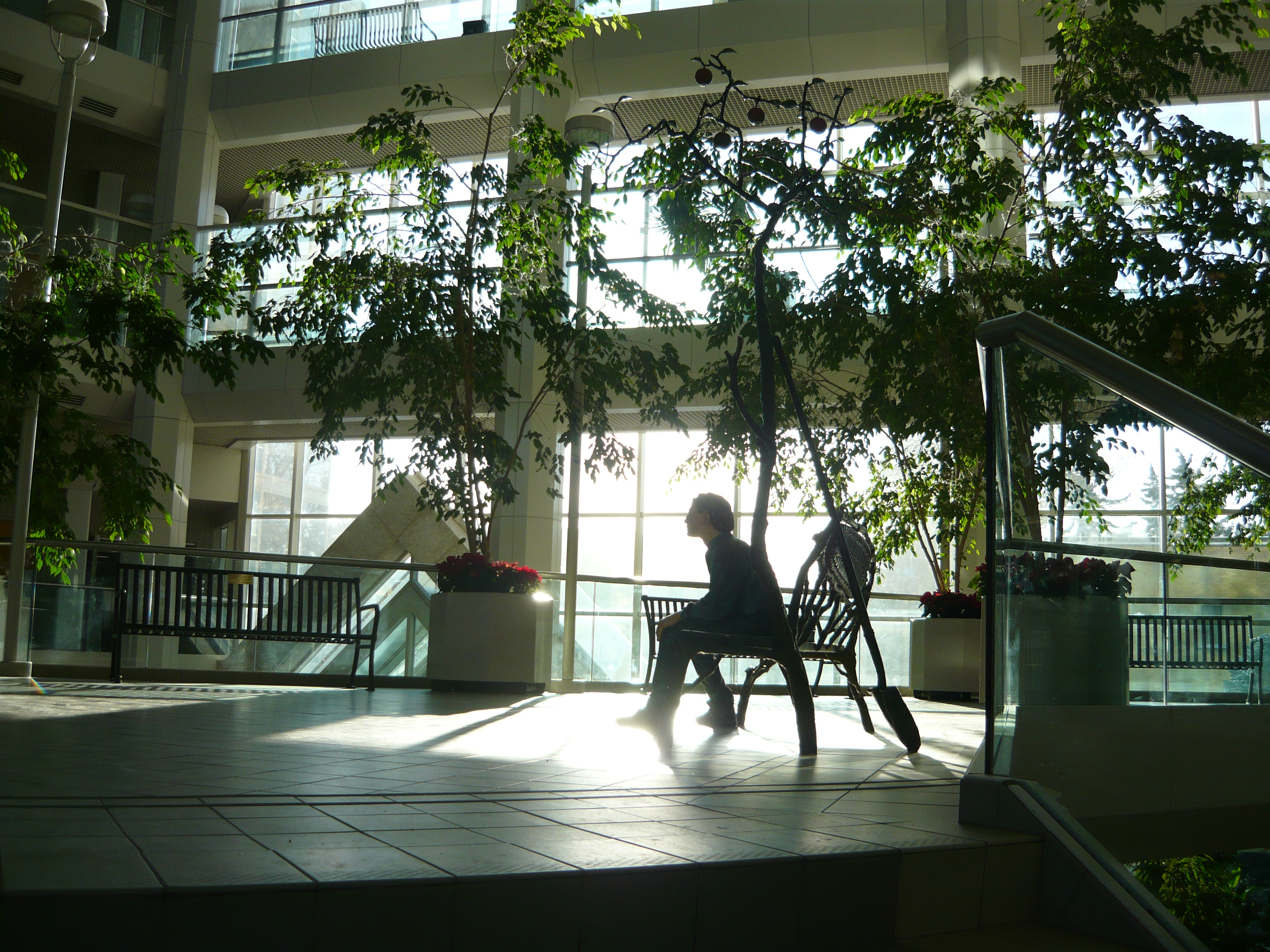
Sculpture in the atrium

The College of Agriculture building and contents are the result of over $100 million of investment. There are 18,000 square metres of usable space, consisting of 180 research labs, 38 teaching labs, 212 staff offices, ten classrooms, four computer classrooms and seven conference rooms. The building has seven levels, including an underground car park and three extended wings. There are also pedestrian walkways to Engineering (east), Anthropology (south), Biology (west) and Kirk Hall (south). The agricultural wall displays are in the walkway connecting the Agriculture and Biology Building. The atrium is named in honour of Leo F. Krisjanson, President of the University of Saskatchewan from 1980 to 1989.

=== Kenderdine Art Gallery ===
Kenderdine Art Gallery opened on October 25, 1991, named after Augustus Kenderdine, who began the University Art Camp at Emma Lake in 1936, the precursor to the Emma Lake Kenderdine Campus. A bequest was donated to the University of Saskatchewan by his daughter, May Beamish, which began the formation of the Kenderdine Art Gallery with a permanent collection started by Dr. Murray and ongoing exhibits.

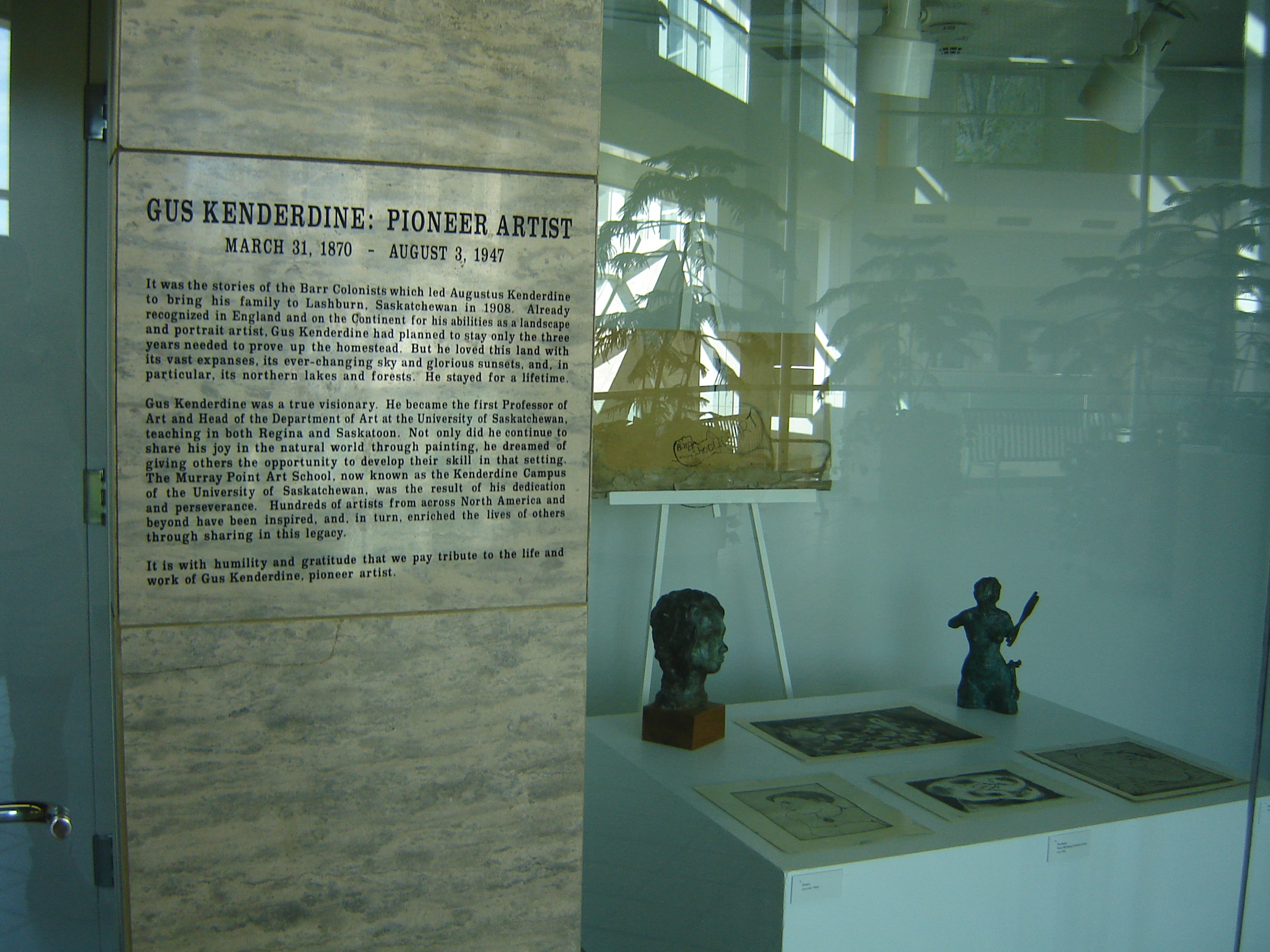
Kenderdine Art Gallery

The Beamish Conservatory in the Atrium of the college is named after May Beamish.

=== Kloppenburg Collection ===
The Kloppenburg Collection is featured on the sixth floor of the College of Agriculture and Bioresources building. The collection features 27 works by Saskatchewan artists, and was donated by Henry R Kloppenburg QC, a Saskatchewan Rhodes Scholar, and Cheryl L Kloppenburg, well known art collectors and patrons of the arts in Saskatchewan. The Kloppenburgs are lawyers in Saskatoon with a longtime interest in the arts and agriculture.

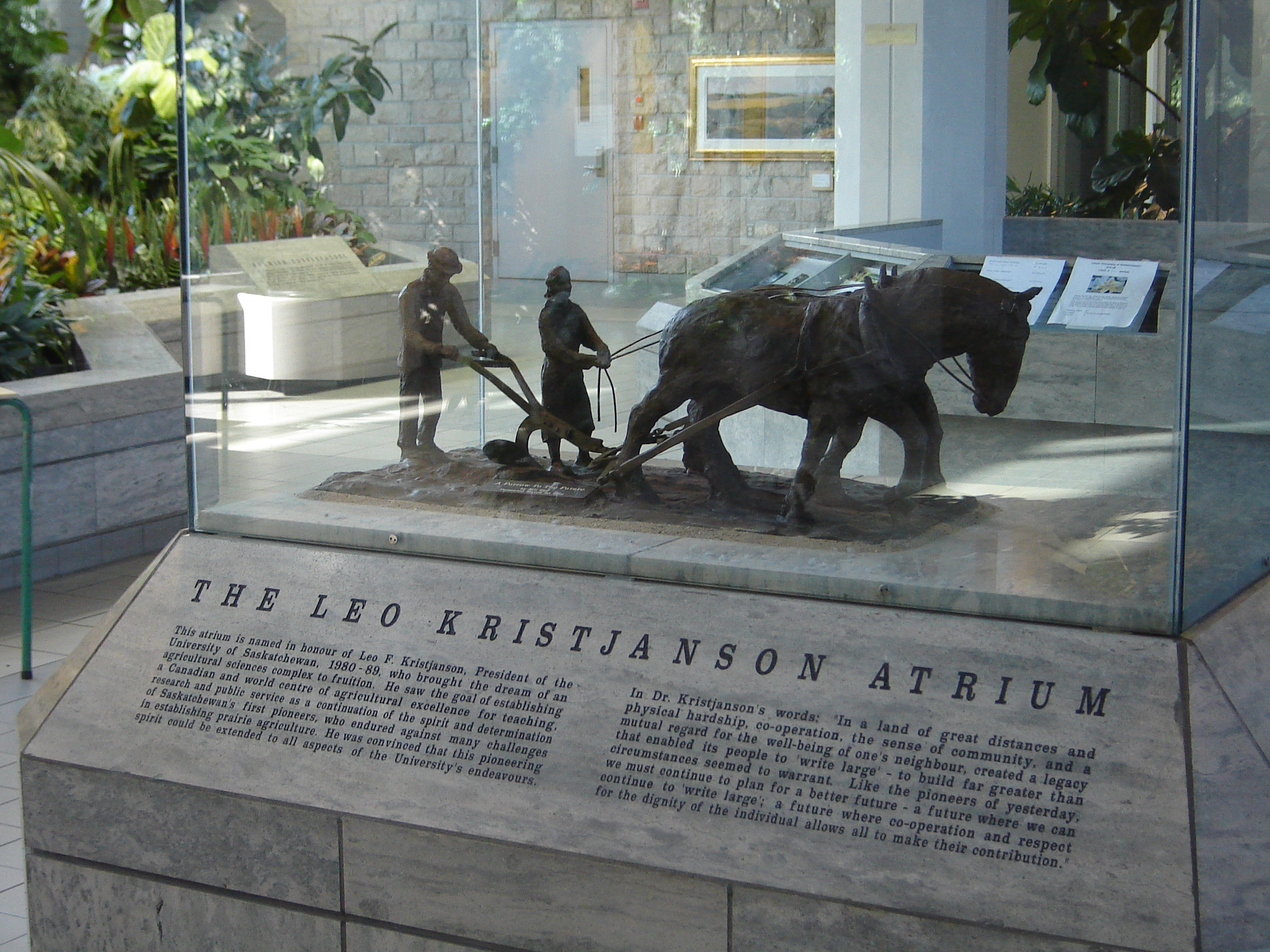
Leo Kristjanson Atrium

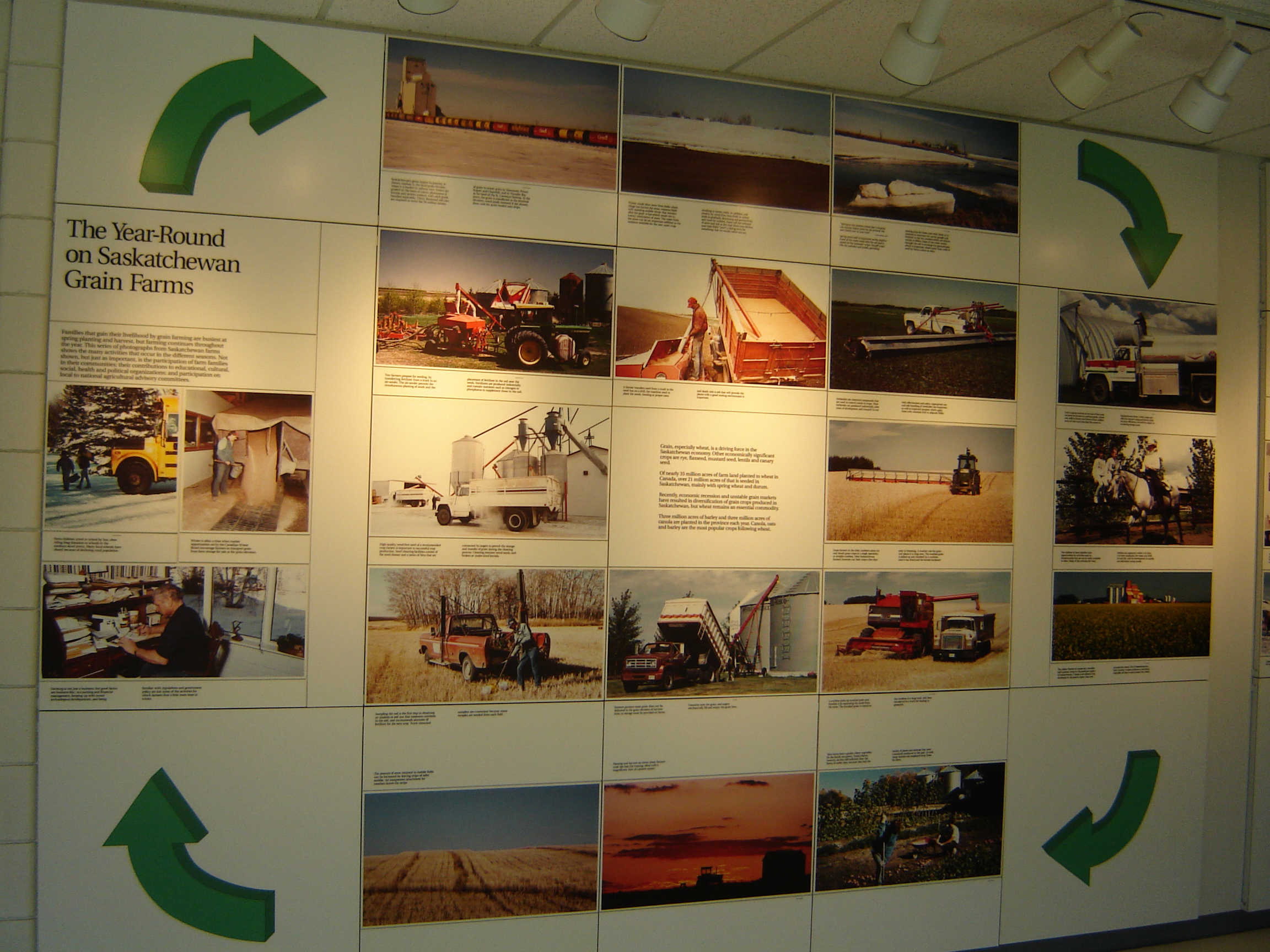
University of Saskatchewan Agricultural displays-Grain Farms

== See also ==
- Canadian Agriculture Safety Association
- College Building (Saskatchewan) national historic site Canada
- University of Saskatchewan
- University of Saskatchewan Academics
- List of agricultural universities and colleges
