= Saskatoon Teachers' College =

Canadian college

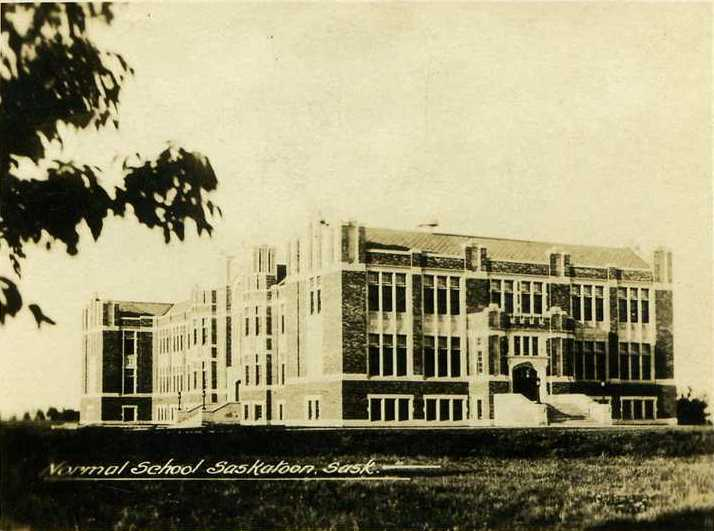
- Saskatoon Normal School c. 1930
- Former name: Saskatoon Normal School
- Active: 1912–1964
- Location: Saskatoon, Saskatechewan, Canada; 52.141252°N 106.669508°W
- Campus: 1030 Idylwyld Dr N

The Saskatoon Teachers' College, originally called the Saskatoon Normal School, was a facility in Saskatoon, Saskatchewan, Canada for training teachers. The school occupied temporary premises at first, then moved to a brick and stone building on Avenue A North in 1922. It was administered by the provincial department of education. In 1964 it was merged into the College of Education of the University of Saskatchewan, and became the Avenue A Campus.

== Early years ==
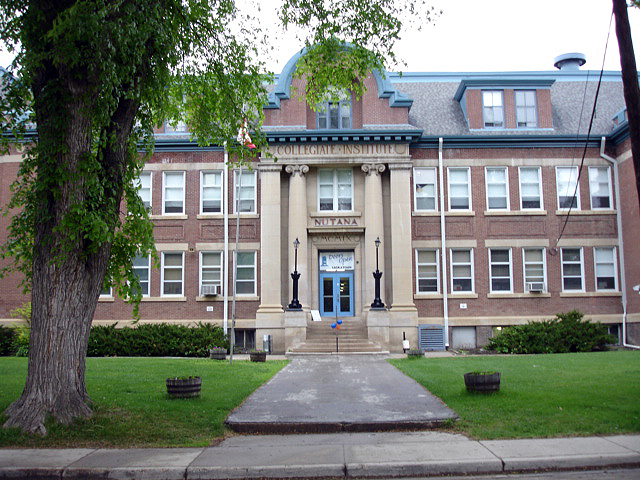
Collegiate Institute, first home of the teacher's college.

The Saskatoon Normal (Note: The term "Normal" referred to the understanding that public schooling should be standardized to follow a government-approved model, and therefore the teachers had to be "normalized".) School opened on 20 August 1912 in rented rooms in the Saskatoon Collegiate Institute (later called the Nutana Collegiate). It was a nondenominational institute for training primary and secondary school teachers. There were twelve second class student teachers and fifty third class students. The students also attended lectures at the University of Saskatchewan. The school moved in 1914 to four rooms rented in the Buena Vista School. In 1916 it moved again to rooms on the first floor of the university's Student's Residence No. 2. In 1919 the school moved again to St. Mary's separate school, and classrooms were also provided by the St. Thomas Presbyterian Church (now St. Thomas Wesley United Church).

== Avenue A ==
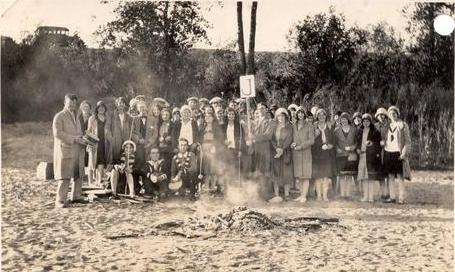
Room J of the Saskatoon Normal School at the wiener roast on the river bank near Yorath Island, 16 September 1930

In 1920 it was decided to build a permanent home for the school on the west side of Saskatoon on Avenue A North. It was a gothic-style brick and Bedford stone building designed by architect Maurice W. Sharon and undertaken by architect David Webster. While construction was under way the school held classes in St. Paul's school on 22nd Street and 4th Avenue. The new school building was opened in March 1922, and the Provincial Normal School was officially opened on 12 February 1923, under the provincial Department of Education. In 1923 there were 335 students in the normal school.

George Moir Weir was an early principal at the Normal School. (Note: George Weir later taught at the University of British Columbia and became Minister of Education of British Columbia from 1933 to 1941.) He was also Grand Master of the Masonic Grand Lodge of Saskatchewan, which funded the War Memorial Scholarship Fund. This sent the best-qualified teachers to the most difficult districts. According to Weir, "the real values of the Scholarship Project depend very largely, not so much on what these teachers actually teach, as on what they are, – on their character, influence and personality." The Church of England missionary societies recruited male and female Anglicans as teachers in Britain to work in Western Canada. Those without training attended a short training course at the Normal School before being sent into the field.

Saskatchewan was a mainly rural province. Weir advocated placing practice teachers in conditions "that obtain in rural communities" instead of in urban schools. In 1930 the occupations of the fathers of students were farmer: 49%, skilled mechanic: 11%, storekeeper: 10%, executive: 9.4%, unskilled laborer: 6.5%, professional: 5% and deceased: 6%. In the years that followed World War I (1914–18) the prairie provinces experienced a great influx of immigrants to Canada, mostly from northern or eastern Europe. In 1937 the principal of the Normal School reported that 45% of the students had non-English origins.

In the summer of 1941 the Normal School gave up its building to the Defense Department for use in training air force recruits. The Normal School moved temporarily to the Wilson School, whose students were relocated to other schools. It returned to the Avenue A premises after the end of World War II (1939–45). The Saskatoon Normal School had an enrollment of 617 student teachers in 1945–46, of which three quarters were women. In 1953 the Normal School was renamed the Saskatoon Teacher's College. Teachers were now to be educated in teaching rather than trained in teaching. In 1959 the entrance requirements for normal schools and colleges of education in Saskatchewan were standardized. The college had 584 students in 1961–62.

== Successor ==
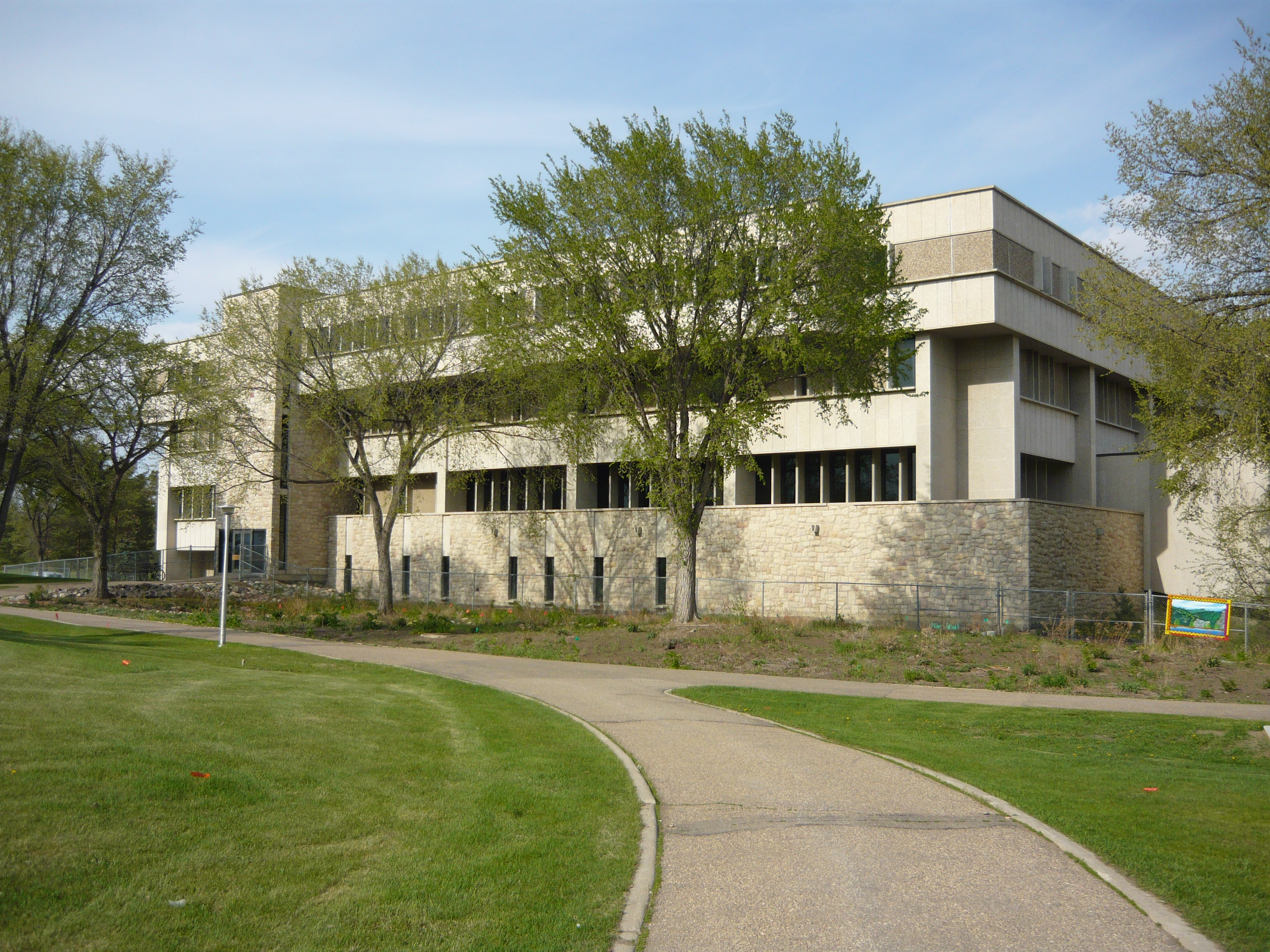
1970 Education Building, University of Saskatchewan

The University of Saskatchewan had established a separate College of Education in 1928, open to students with undergraduate degrees. It prepared students to teach in high schools and collegiates, and also undertook research in education. The college did not offer training in elementary education until 1952.

In 1964 the Department of Education and the University of Saskatchewan agreed to integrate the Saskatoon and Regina teacher's colleges with the university's College of Education. Classes continued in the building at 1030 Avenue A North, now called the University of Saskatchewan Avenue A campus. A new building was constructed on the university campus, opened in the spring on 1970. In 1986 the original Saskatoon Teachers College building was renamed the E.A. Davies building in honor of Fred Davies, a pioneer of technical education in Saskatchewan.

== Noted teachers and students ==
- Henry Bonli (1927–2011), artist
- Ernest Julian "Ernie" Cole (1916–2000), politician
- Reta Cowley (1910–2004), artist
- Arnold Feusi (1912–1998), politician
- Allan Ray Guy (born 1926), politician
- Herschel Lee Howell (1912–1990), politician
- Ben Klassen (1918–1993), white supremacist
- Roy Knight (1891–1971), politician
- Olga Kotelko (1919–2014), nonagenarian athlete
- Miro Kwasnica (born 1935), politician
- Al Matsalla (born 1926), politician
- J. D. McAskill (1908–1994), politician
- Ray Meiklejohn (born 1935), politician
- John Sproule Mills (1887–1972), politician
- Wynona Mulcaster (born 1915), artist
- Wesley Albert Robbins (1916–2008), politician
- Otto Rogers (born 1935), artist
- Herman Rolfes (born 1936), politician
- John Henry Sturdy (1893–1966), politician
- Clarence George Willis (1907–1984), politician
