= Reta Cowley =

Canadian painter

- Born: Reta Madeline Summers; 1 April 1910; Moose Jaw, Saskatchewan, Canada
- Died: 23 November 2004 (aged 94)
- Occupations: Teacher, painter
- Known for: Prairie landscapes

Reta Cowley (born Reta Madeline Summers; 1 April 1910 – 23 November 2004) was a Canadian painter. She is known for her watercolours of the prairie country around Saskatoon, Saskatchewan, which capture the unique qualities of space and light.

== Life ==
Reta Madeline Summers was born in Moose Jaw, Saskatchewan, on 1 April 1910. She grew up near Truax and in Yorkton. She attended the Saskatoon Normal School and graduated with a teacher's certificate in 1930. During the Great Depression she taught in rural schools in Saskatchewan. From 1938 to 1946 she held a permanent teaching position in Yorkton.

In 1937 Reta attended the Emma Lake Artists' Workshops of the University of Saskatchewan. They had been founded in 1936 by Augustus Kenderdine. She returned to the Emma Lake school in 1938, 1939 and 1940. Gordon Snelgrove taught her art history, and Kenderdine taught her to paint in the Barbizon school's tradition of painting nature directly, en plein air. Reta studied at the Banff School of Fine Arts in the summers of 1941–44, where Walter J. Phillips taught her watercolor techniques.

Reta married Fred Cowley in 1945, adopting his surname. She no longer had to teach, and moved with him to Saskatoon. There she took night classes at the University of Saskatchewan under Eli Bornstein and Nicolas Bjelajac. In the early 1950s Reta Cowley taught at the Emma Lake Summer School. She was a participant in the workshop of 1963. In 1966 she was awarded a BA from the University of Saskatchewan. She taught sessions at the university until 1972, and taught public school until 1975, when she retired and devoted herself to painting. Reta Cowley died on 23 November 2004 at the age of 94.

== Work ==
Bornstein taught Reta Cowley to use form and colour to structure her paintings and to pattern her brush strokes. She became more aware of modern artists such as Cézanne and John Marin. Cowley's watercolour style had matured by the late 1960s, one in which she depicted the landscapes of the prairies in terms of their unique qualities of light and space. Unlike other watercolourists, Cowley's work shows no signs of an initial pencil drawing. The delicate washes of colour are applied without need for such a framework. Her style combines elements of British naturalism and American modernism. It has been compared to the styles of Walter J. Phillips and David Milne.

Clement Greenberg wrote, "Among the outspokenly representational painters of merit in Saskatoon was Reta Cowley, who renders the villages and towns of central Saskatchewan with delicacy and fresh feeling, She demonstrates that one can learn from Cézanne and Klee how to make nature more, not less, vivid in pictorial art." In 1949 Reta Cowley wrote for an art school scrapbook, "Let us carry back with us into everyday life some of the strength and serenity of the woods. Here we are close to nature. Its cycle of growth and decay and new life can teach us a healthy attitude to the eternal change which is in and above us. Memories of the peace and beauty of our northland can fill a corner of our mind to which we can withdraw for renewed courage when times are difficult."

=== Selected solo exhibitions ===
Cowley's solo exhibitions included:

- 1955 Saskatoon Art Centre, Saskatoon, Saskatchewan.
- 1969 Mendel Art Gallery, Saskatoon, Saskatchewan. (toured)
- 1970 Saskatchewan Arts Board, Regina, Saskatchewan.
- 1973 Shoestring Gallery, Saskatoon, Saskatchewan.
- 1975 Norman Mackenzie Art Gallery, Regina, Saskatchewan..
- 1976 The Edmonton Art Gallery, Edmonton, Alberta.
- 1977 Dunlop Art Gallery, Regina, Sask Thomas Gallery, Winnipeg, Manitoba.
- 1978 Canadian Art Galleries Ltd., Calgary, Alberta.
- 1980 Canadian Art Galleries Ltd., Calgary, Alberta.
  - Gallery One, Saskatoon, Saskatchewan.
  - Thomas Gallery, Winnipeg, Manitoba.
  - West End Gallery, Edmonton, Alberta.
- 1983 Downstairs Gallery, Edmonton, Alberta.
  - Gallery One, Toronto, Ontario.
  - 1985 Canadian Art Galleries Ltd., Calgary, Alberta.
  - Gallery One, Toronto, Ontario.
  - The Gallery/Art Placement Inc., Saskatoon, Saskatchewan.
  - Woltjen/Udell Gallery, Edmonton, Alberta.
- 1986 Mendel Art Gallery, Saskatoon, Saskatchewan, Reta Cowley: A Survey (toured)
- 1999 The Gallery/Art Placement Inc. Saskatoon, Saskatchewan.
- 2000 The Gallery/Art Placement Inc.Saskatoon, Saskatchewan.
- 2000 Mendel Art Gallery, Saskatoon, Saskatchewan.
- 2009 The Gallery/Art Placement Inc.Saskatoon, Saskatchewan.
- 2010 "In the Field" – Moose Jaw Art Gallery and Museum, Moose Jaw, Saskatchewan.
- 2011 "In the Field" – The Gallery/Art Placement Inc.Saskatoon, Saskatchewan.
- 2013 "An Independent View" – The Gallery/Art Placement Inc.Saskatoon, Saskatchewan.

=== Major collections ===
Cowley's work is held in the following major collections:

- Art Gallery of Hamilton, Hamilton, Ontario.
- Banff Centre, Banff, Alberta.
- Canada Council Art Bank, Ottawa, Ontario.
- Department of External Affairs, Government of Canada, Ottawa, Ontario.
- Edmonton Art Gallery, Edmonton, Alberta.
- Glenbow Museum, Calgary, Alberta.
- Mendel Art Gallery, Saskatoon, Saskatchewan.
- Mount Allison University, Sackville, New Brunswick.
- Norman Mackenzie Art Gallery, Regina, Saskatchewan.
- Saskatchewan Arts Board, Regina, Saskatchewan.
- Saskatchewan Government Insurance, Regina, Saskatchewan.
- SaskTel, Regina, Saskatchewan.
- Shell Oil Corporation, Calgary, Alberta.
- The Potash Corporation of Saskatchewan, Saskatoon, Saskatchewan.
- University of Regina, Regina, Saskatchewan.
- University of Saskatchewan, Saskatoon, Saskatchewan.
- Winnipeg Art Gallery, Winnipeg, Manitoba.

== Sources ==
- Greenberg, Clement (1 June 1995). The Collected Essays and Criticism, Volume 4: Modernism with a Vengeance, 1957–1969. University of Chicago Press. ISBN 978-0-226-30624-7.
- Porter, Jene M. (1 January 2008). Perspectives of Saskatchewan. Univ. of Manitoba Press. ISBN 978-0-88755-353-0.
- "Reta Cowley". Saskatchewan NAC.
- "Reta Cowley". The GALLERY / art placement.
- "Reta Cowley". Winchester Galleries.
- Sowiak, Christine (2014). "COWLEY, RETA (1910–2004)". The Encyclopedia of Saskatchewan.
