= Mina Forsyth =

Canadian artist

Mina Mabel Forsyth
- Born: Mina Mabel McDonald; September 20, 1921; Estevan, Saskatchewan, Canada
- Died: 1987 (aged 65–66)
- Education: Queen's University, University of Manitoba, Michigan State University
- Known for: painting
- Style: expressionism
- Awards: Lifetime Achievement Award, Saskatchewan Arts Board

Mina Forsyth (September 20, 1921 in Estevan, Saskatchewan – 1987 in Saskatoon, Saskatchewan) was a Canadian artist. She is known for her expressionist and abstract landscapes, figural works and still life paintings.

== Education ==
In 1955 Mina Forsyth received a Bachelor of Fine Arts degree from the University of Manitoba. She also had an MA from Michigan State University, which she received in 1957. In Michigan State she studied under Abraham Rattner. Forsyth attended the Emma Lake Artists' Workshops in 1955, 1965, 1966, and 1967.

== Career ==
During the 1950s, 60s, 70s, and 80s, Forsyth attended many workshops at Emma Lake Artists' Workshops at Murray Point, Saskatchewan, studying with artists such as Jack Shadbolt, Jules Olitski, Lawrence Alloway, Harold Cohen, Frank Stella, Walter Darby Bannard, John McLean, Tim Hilton, and Terry Atkinson. Forsyth also attended the Banff Centre for the Arts and the Gimli Summer School in Gimli, Manitoba.

Forsyth was a guest artist at an Emma Lake workshop in 1977 and worked at the University of Saskatchewan as professor emeritus and as an art instructor until she retired in 1985. In 1991, Forsyth received a posthumous Lifetime Achievement Award from the Saskatchewan Arts Board.

== Exhibitions ==
Selected Group Exhibitions

- 1949 — Banff School of Fine Arts, Banff, Alberta, Banff Travelling Exhibit
  - Hudson's Bay Company, Winnipeg, Manitoba, Young Contemporaries
- 1967 — Norman Mackenzie Art Gallery, Regina, Saskatchewan, Saskatchewan Centennial Exhibition (curated by Clement Greenberg)
- 1972 — Mendal Art Gallery, Saskatoon, Saskatchewan, Drawings by Eight Painters
- 1974 — R.C. Dahl National Exhibition Center, Swift Current, Saskatchewan, Contemporary Saskatchewan Paintings & Sculpture
- 1976 — Dunlop Art Gallery, Regina Public Library, Regina, Saskatchewan

Selected Solo Exhibitions

- 1957 — Michigan State University, East Lansing, Michigan, Graduate Exhibition
- 1968 — Marquis Gallery, University of Saskatchewan, Saskatoon, Saskatchewan
- 1975 — Shoestring Gallery, Saskatoon, Saskatchewan
- 1977 — Frances Morrison Library Gallery, Saskatoon, Saskatchewan
- 1979 — Shoestring Gallery, Saskatoon, Saskatchewan
  - Regina Modern Dance Works
  - Lea Collins Gallery, Regina, Saskatchewan
  - Rosemont Art Gallery, Regina, Saskatchewan
- 1981 — Gallery One, Saskatoon, SK, Six Tenant Farmers and Other Works
- 1982 — Gordon Snelgrove Art Gallery, University of Saskatchewan, Saskatoon, Saskatchewan
- 1985 — Mendel Art Gallery, Saskatoon, Saskatchewan, Mina Forsyth: Flowers and Heads

== Accolades ==
Awards

- 1954 — Winnipeg Show Student Prize, University of Manitoba, Winnipeg, Manitoba
- 1955 — Saskatchewan Jubilee Prize for Painting, Government of Saskatchewan, Regina, Saskatchewan
- 1965 — Second Prize, Saskatchewan and Canadian Centennial Poetry Competition

== Sources ==
- "Mina Mabel Forsyth" Saskatchewan Council for Archives and Archivists. Retrieved 2016-02-26.
- "Forsyth, Mina Mabel" Canadian Women Artists. Retrieved 2016-02-26.
- "Mina Forsyth fonds" SAIN Collections. Retrieved 2016-02-26.
