= Lashburn =

Town in Saskatchewan, Canada

- Town
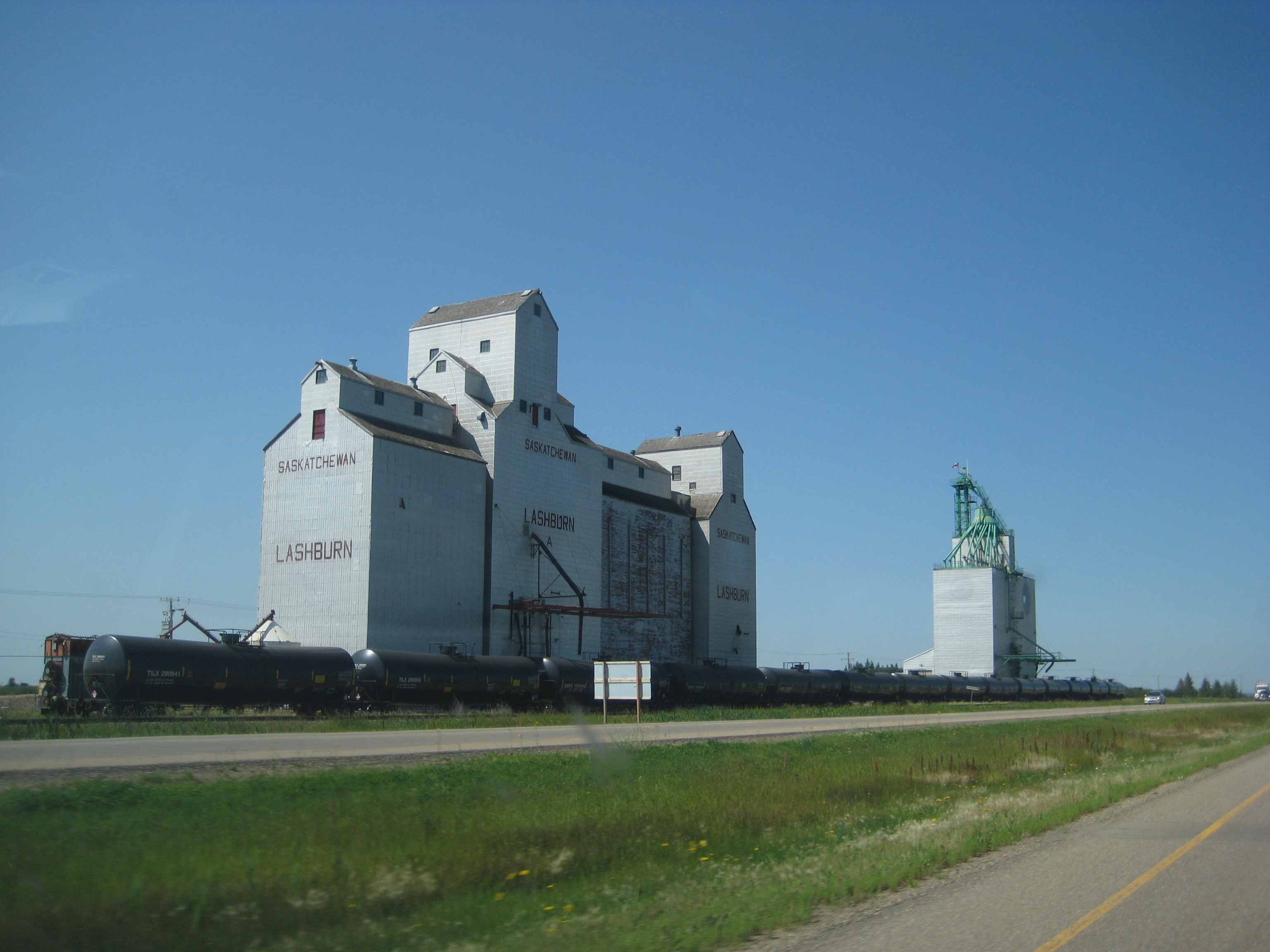
- Grain elevator in Lashburn

- Location of Lashburn in Saskatchewan Lashburn (Canada)
- Coordinates: 53.124°N 109.613°W
- Country: Canada
- Province: Saskatchewan
- Census division: No. 17
- Rural Municipality: Wilton
- Post office Founded: 1905

Government
  - Mayor: Jim Kryssa
  - Town Manager: Brad McKenzie
  - Governing body: Lashburn Town Council

Area
  - Total: 3.11 km^{2} (1.20 sq mi)

Population (2011)
  - Total: 967
  - Density: 310.5/km^{2} (804/sq mi)
- Time zone: UTC−7 (MST)
  - Summer (DST): UTC−6 (MDT)
- Postal code: S0M 1H0
- Area code: 306
- Highways: Highway 16
- Website: Official website

Lashburn is a town in Saskatchewan, Canada. It is located 35 km (22 miles) east of Lloydminster and 107 km (66 miles) west of North Battleford on the Yellowhead Highway, on the banks of the Battle River. It was founded in 1903 with the arrival of the Barr Colonists, led by Isaac Barr (an Anglican priest).

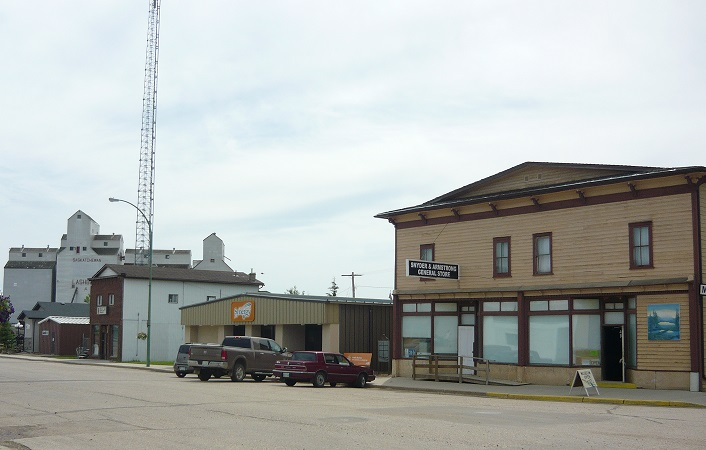
Centennial Museum Main Street

== Demographics ==
In the 2021 Census of Population conducted by Statistics Canada, Lashburn had a population of 870 living in 327 of its 360 total private dwellings, a change of −11.5% from its 2016 population of 983. With a land area of 3.05 km^{2} (1.18 sq mi), it had a population density of 285.2/km^{2} (738.8/sq mi) in 2021.

Canada census – Lashburn community profile

	2021	2011
Population	870 (-11.5% from 2016)	967 (+5.8% from 2006)
Land area	3.05 km^{2} (1.18 sq mi)	3.11 km^{2} (1.20 sq mi)
Population density	285.1/km^{2} (738/sq mi)	310.5/km^{2} (804/sq mi)
Median age	33.6 (M: 31.6, F: 35.2)	30.7 (M: 30.3, F: 31.1)
Private dwellings	360 (total) 327 (occupied)	373 (total)
Median household income	$100,000

References: 2021 2011

== Notable people ==
- Henry Bonli (1927–2011), painter and interior designer
- Dwight Carruthers played two games in the NHL for the Detroit Red Wings and Philadelphia Flyers
- Edward Charles (1919–1986), a flying ace with the Royal Air Force during the Second World War
- George Krissa is an actor and musician originally from Lashburn. He is known for his roles in television movies like The Holiday Sitter on Hallmark, and has also performed on stage at the Stratford Festival, the Royal Alexandra Theatre and the Shaw Festival.

== See also ==
- List of communities in Saskatchewan
- List of towns in Saskatchewan
