= Dorothy Knowles =

Canadian artist (1927–2023)

Dorothy Knowles CM SOM RCA
- Born: Dorothy Elsie Knowles; April 6, 1927; Unity, Saskatchewan, Canada
- Died: May 16, 2023 (aged 96); Saskatoon, Saskatchewan, Canada
- Education: University of Saskatchewan, Goldsmith School of Art, Emma Lake Artists' Workshops
- Known for: Painter
- Spouse: William Perehudoff
- Awards: Order of Canada, Saskatchewan Order of Merit

Dorothy Elsie Knowles CM SOM RCA (April 6, 1927 – May 16, 2023) was a Canadian visual artist, most notable for her landscape paintings. She was the widow of William Perehudoff, a fellow artist who is closely associated with the Color Field movement.

Knowles died in Saskatoon, Saskatchewan, on May 16, 2023, at the age of 96.

== Career ==
Knowles studied with Eli Bornstein at the University of Saskatchewan and she went on to study at the Goldsmith School of Art in London and Banff Centre. She was influenced by her studies at the Emma Lake Artists' Workshops. She is known for her often large perceptual landscape paintings and exhibitions of her work have been mounted across Canada and the United States.

Knowles was appointed a Member of the Saskatchewan Order of Merit (SOM) in 1987, and became a Member of the Order of Canada (CM) in 2004. She was made a member of the Royal Canadian Academy of Arts. In 2012, Knowles received the Queen Elizabeth II Diamond Jubilee Medal.

Two postage stamps depicting paintings by Knowles, The Field of Rapeseed (1971) and North Saskatchewan River (1971) were issued by Canada Post on April 7, 2006.
