= Emma Lake Artists' Workshops =

Art classes by the University of Saskatchewan

The Emma Lake Artists' Workshops are affiliated with the University of Saskatchewan in Saskatoon. Summer art classes were originally taught by Augustus Kenderdine at Murray Point on Emma Lake in 1936. Kenneth Lochhead and Arthur McKay, professors at the University of Saskatchewan, Regina Campus (now called the University of Regina since 1974) initiated the more famous Emma Lake Artists' Workshops in 1955.

== Workshop leaders by date ==
- 1955 Jack Shadbolt (workshop leader)
- 1956 Joseph Plaskett (workshop leader)
- 1957 Will Barnet (workshop leader)
- 1958 No workshop
- 1959 Barnett Newman (workshop leader)
- 1960 John Ferren (workshop leader)
- 1961 Herman Cherry (workshop leader)
- 1962 Clement Greenberg (workshop leader)
- 1963 Kenneth Noland (workshop leader)
- 1964 Jules Olitski and Stephan Wolpe (workshop leaders)
- 1965 Lawrence Alloway and John Cage (workshop leaders)
- 1966 Harold Cohen (workshop leader)
- 1967 Frank Stella (workshop leader)
- 1968 Donald Judd (workshop leader) (The workshop was not held at Emma Lake, but at Rapid River Lodge, Lac La Ronge)
- 1969 Michael Steiner (workshop leader)
- 1970 Ronald B. Kitaj (workshop leader)
- 1971 no workshop
- 1972 Roy Kiyooka (workshop leader)
- 1973 William Wiley (workshop leader)
- 1974 no workshop
- 1975 no workshop
- 1976 Toni Onley, Douglas Haynes, Hubert Hohn, Sidney Tillim, Harold Feist, Hans Dommasch, Daniel Solomon, Andre Fauteux, Otto Rogers, Bruce O'Neil, Joseph Reeder, and Alan Gliko (workshop guest leaders)
- 1977 Wynona Mulcaster, Richard Mock, Warren Rohrer, Ken Carpenter, Edna Andrade, Mina Forsyth, Rick Chenier, Carol Sutton, Anthony Caro, Terry Fenton, Douglas Bentham, and Otto Rogers (workshop guest leaders)
- 1978 no workshop
- 1979 Friedel Dzubas and John Elderfield (workshop leaders)
- 1980 Kenworth Moffett and Darryl Hughto (workshop leaders)
- 1981 Walter Darby Bannard and John McLean (workshop leaders)
- 1982 Stanley Boxer and James Wolfe (workshop leaders)
- 1983 Charles Millard and Larry Zox (workshop leaders)
- 1984 Tim Scott and Valentin Tatransky (workshop leaders)
- 1985 Maryann Harmon and Karen Wilkin (workshop leaders)
- 1986 Peter Bradley and John Link (workshop leaders)
- 1987 Tim Hilton and Terry Atkinson (workshop leaders)
- 1988 Joseph Drapell, Harold Feist, and Douglas Haynes (workshop leaders)
- 1989 Paterson Ewen, Sandra Paikowsky, and Joseph Masheck (workshop leaders)
- 1990 Mali Morris, Robert Kudielka, Dorothy Knowles, and Willard Boepple (workshop leaders)
- 1991 Kenneth Noland, John Gibbons, Terry Fenton and Nancy Tousley (workshop leaders)
- 1992
- 1993 Medrie McFwee, Lee Tribe, and Lynn Donahue (workshop leaders)
- 1994 Janet Fish and Victor Cicansky (workshop leaders)
- 1995 Judith Swartz and Landon Mackenzie (workshop leaders)
- 2001 Chris Cran (workshop leader)
- 2002
- 2003 Karen Wilkin and Clay Ellis (workshop leaders)
- 2004
- 2005 Robert Christie and Ron Shuebrook(co-workshop leaders)
- 2007 Monica Tap (workshop leader)
- 2009 Kim Dorland (workshop leader)
- 2010
- 2011 David T. Alexander (workshop leader)
- 2012 Elizabeth McIntosh (workshop leader)

== Publications ==
- The Flat Side of the Landscape: the Emma Lake Artists' Workshops / curator/editor: John O'Brian; essays, John O'Brian ... [et al.] Saskatoon : Mendel Art Gallery, c1989 (Published for the exhibition, The flat side of the landscape : the Emma Lake Artists' Workshops held from October 5, 1989 to April 21, 1991)
- Abstraction West : Emma Lake and after = Abstraction dans l'Ouest : le lac Emma et après / by Terry Fenton. Ottawa : National Gallery of Canada for the Corporation of the National Museums of Canada, 1976
- Emma Lake Workshops, 1955-1973. [Catalogue of an exhibition held from] September 21 to October 21, 1973. Regina : Norman Mackenzie Art Gallery, 1973
