= Joseph Plaskett =

Canadian artist (1918–2014)

- Born: Joseph Francis Plaskett; July 12, 1918; New Westminster, B.C.
- Died: September 21, 2014 (aged 96); Suffolk, England
- Education: Vancouver School of Art night school, San Francisco School of Art (1946); with Hans Hofmann (1946); with Fernand Léger and others, Paris (1949-1951); Slade School, London (1951-1952)
- Partner: Mario Ducet
- Awards: First Emily Carr Fellowship (1946) for study in the U.S.; Canadian Government overseas scholarship (1954-1955); Canada Council grant to Europe (1967); Officer of the Order of Canada (2000)
- Elected: R.C.A.; C.G.P.; B.C. Society of Artists

Joseph Plaskett OC RCA (12 July 1918 – 21 September 2014) was a Canadian painter. His special gift was painting still life and flowers. He also worked in pastel.

== Biography ==
Plaskett was born in New Westminster, British Columbia in 1918. He initially studied history, and taught school for six years but in 1944, became interested in art. He studied at Emily Carr University of Art and Design and the Banff School of Fine Arts, where his teacher was A.Y. Jackson. In 1945, he joined the B. C. Society of Artists. In 1946, having been awarded the first Emily Carr Scholarship for study in the U.S. by Lawren Harris, he studied at the San Francisco School of Art. Afterwards, he taught at the Winnipeg School of Art where he was made director (1947-1949) In summers, he studied in New York and once, with Hans Hofmann in Provincetown in 1947. From 1949 to 1951, in Paris, he studied with Fernand Léger. He then studied at the Slade School, London (1951-1952) with a bursary awarded by the British Arts Council. He took etching and engraving with Stanley William Hayter in Paris in 1953 with the aid of a Canadian Government Overseas Scholarship, and opened a studio there in 1957.

In Paris, Plaskett, having renounced abstraction, painted still lifes in oils and did pastels that Vancouver Sun art critic Michael Scott described as “romanticized impressionism”. He was appointed to the Order of Canada in 2000. He was made a member of the Royal Canadian Academy of Arts. He was also a member of the Canadian Group of Painters.

In 2000, he moved to Suffolk, England. In 2004, he founded the Joseph Plaskett Foundation which awards scholarships to Canadian artists. Plaskett said,

"In my long career I have been a recipient of many awards.... These revolutionized my development. These awards all came from my country. I am paying my dues."

He died on 21 September 2014 at the age of 96.
