= Eli Bornstein =

American-born Canadian artist and teacher

Eli Bornstein CM SOM
- Born: December 28, 1922 (age 103); Milwaukee, Wisconsin, U.S.
- Occupation: Artist
- Known for: "Structurist" reliefs

Eli Bornstein CM SOM (born December 28, 1922) is an American-born Canadian artist and teacher who has spent most of his life in Saskatchewan, Canada.

He is known for his contributions to abstract art in Canada through his creation of three-dimensional artworks he called Structurist Reliefs.

== Early years ==
Eli Bornstein was born in Milwaukee, Wisconsin on December 28, 1922.

Bornstein was creative from a young age, taking art classes throughout his life. He enrolled in art courses while at Milwaukee State Teachers College in 1941. He earned a bachelor of science in art in 1945.

From 1945-1950, Bornstein taught drawing, painting, sculpture, and design at the Milwaukee Art Institute and the University of Wisconsin–Milwaukee. He began teaching at the University of Saskatchewan's Department of Art in 1950, travelling between Saskatoon and Madison, Wisconsin where he was earning a master's degree in graphic techniques.

== Career ==
In 1950 Bornstein became head of the newly established Department of Fine Arts at the University of Saskatchewan. During his summer breaks he studied in Paris, France at the Académie de Montmartre of Fernand Léger in 1951 and at the Académie Julian in 1952. He also studied at the University of Wisconsin–Madison, and obtained an MSc in 1954. Bornstein resigned from his position as head of the Fine Arts department in 1971. Bornstein became a Canadian citizen in 1972. He continued to teach art at the University of Saskatchewan until 1990, when he retired.

Bornstein's early drawings, paintings, prints and sculptures used abstract and cubist techniques to depict nature. In 1956 he won a commission from the Saskatchewan Teachers' Federation to make an abstract welded aluminum sculpture named "Growth Motif". He began to make three-dimensional "structurist" reliefs during a sabbatical in Italy and the Netherlands in 1957. In Europe he met and was influenced by artists such as Jean Gorin, Joost Baljeu, Anthony Hill, Kenneth Martin, Mary Martin, Victor Pasmore and Georges Vantongerloo.

In 1960, Bornstein founded The Structurist, a journal that appears annually or biannually with each edition devoted to a particular theme. The journal was published by the University of Saskatchewan until 2010. As of 2017 he was still actively working. Bornstein is one of the most influential senior artists in the Canadian Prairies region.

== Work ==
Bornstein's reliefs are made of multiple planes whose shadows vary with changing light. They combine color, form, and space. He says that in color they have roots in Claude Monet and the impressionists, and in form they derive from the work of Paul Cézanne, Kazimir Malevich and cubism. Piet Mondrian has influenced both their color and their form. Bornstein used a single ground plane for his early reliefs, with forms mounted on that plane. In 1966 he made his first works with two planes. Later he began experimenting with multiple planes.

In 1964 his massive frieze named Structural Relief in Fifteen Parts was installed in the Richardson Airport terminal in Winnipeg, Canada. This early work used primary colors and a small number of rectangular forms. Over time the reliefs have become more complex in their form and color. Sometimes Bornstein would work on one relief for three to five years. Although abstract, the works of painted aluminum evoke the forms and colours of the landscape of Saskatchewan. Bornstein is also known for his large sculptures.

== Exhibitions and collections ==
Bornstein has exhibited in solo and group shows in Canada, the United States and Europe. Some of Bornstein's major work are held in the Winnipeg International Air Terminal (1962, now at the University of Manitoba in Winnipeg), Wascana Centre Authority building in Regina (1982) and Canadian Light Source building in Saskatoon (2004). His Hexaplane Structurist Construction No. 1 was made for Jacobs University Bremen in Germany, and his Hexaplane Structurist Construction No. 2 for the University of Manitoba in Winnipeg. Collections that hold his work include:

- Canadian Centre for Architecture (Montreal)
- Canada Council Art Bank (Ottawa)
- National Gallery of Canada (Ottawa)
- Saskatchewan Arts Board (Regina)
- Walker Art Center (Minneapolis)
- Museum of Art Fort Lauderdale, (Florida)
- Mendel Art Gallery (Saskatoon)
- Klein (Los Angeles).

== Sources ==
- Botar, Oliver A. I. (2013). "An Art at the Mercy of Light": Recent Works by Eli Bornstein. Saskatoon: Mendel Art Gallery. ISBN 978-1-896359-83-0.
- Cochrane, Steven Leyden (2014-01-30). "Finding his light". Winnipeg Free Press.
- "Eli Bornstein". ArtSask.
- "Eli Bornstein". Saskatchewan NAC.
- Enright, Robert (December 2013). "Plane Talk: An Interview with Eli Bornstein". Border Crossings (128).
- Ivanochko, Bob (2014). "Bornstein, Eli (1922–)". Encyclopedia of Saskatchewan. University of Regina.
- Moppet, George (2008-05-21). "Eli Bornstein". Canadian Encyclopedia. Historica Canada.
- Nasgaard, Roald (2024). Eli Bornstein: Life & Work. Toronto: Art Canada Institute. ISBN 978-1-4871-0347-7.
