= Mendel Art Gallery =

Mendel Art Gallery and Civic Conservatory
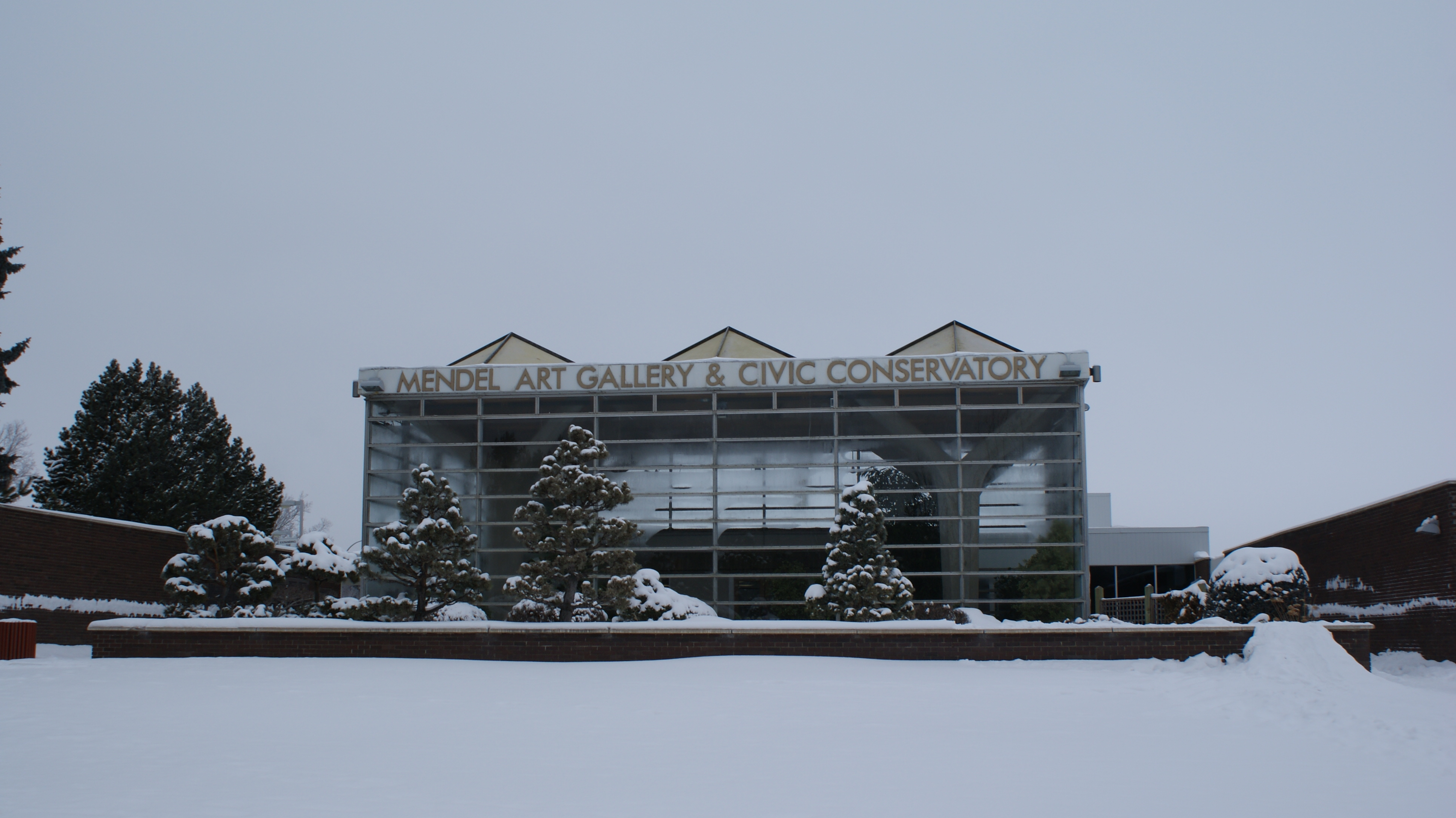
- Mendel Art Gallery and Civic Conservatory
- Established: October 16, 1964
- Dissolved: June 7, 2015
- Location: Saskatoon, Saskatchewan, Canada
- Coordinates: 52.1348°N 106.6490°W
- Type: Art museum and conservatory
- Collection size: 7,500
- Visitors: 180,000 (2010)
- Directors: Gregory Burke, Executive Director & CEO
- Curators: Sandra Fraser, Acting Chief Curator
- Website: www.mendel.ca

The Mendel Art Gallery was a major creative cultural centre in City Park, Saskatoon, Saskatchewan. Operating from 1964 to 2015, it housed a permanent collection of more than 7,500 works of art. The gallery was managed by the city-owned Saskatoon Gallery and Conservatory Corporation, which also managed the Mendel's sister institution, the Saskatoon Civic Conservatory. In 1999, it was the 16th largest public art gallery in Canada by budget size and had the sixth highest overall attendance in the country. By 2010, it had more than 180,000 visitors.

Plans to expand the Mendel Art Gallery began in the 2000s, although they were later abandoned by the City of Saskatoon government in favour of establishing a new art museum. The Mendel Art Gallery was closed on 7 June 2015, with its assets divided between the City of Saskatoon government and the new art museum. The permanent collection of the Mendel Art Gallery was transferred to the new art museum, the Remai Modern, after its opening in October 2017.

== History ==
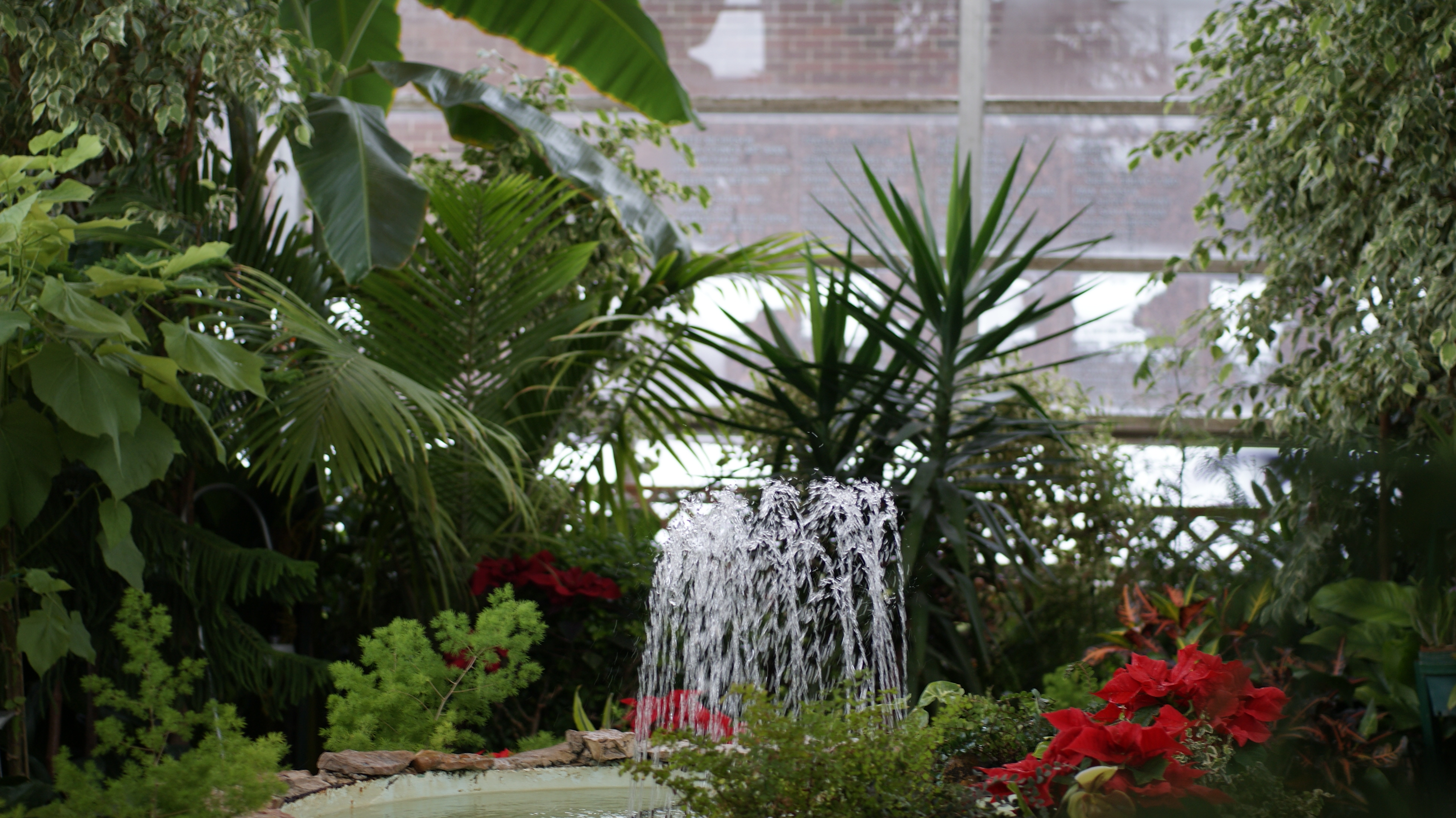
Civic Conservatory interior

The Mendel Art Gallery grew out of the Saskatoon Art Centre, which opened in 1944 in the Standard Trust Building and moved several times, the last time in 1963 to a back room on Fourth Avenue North. It was endowed by Frederick "Fred" Salomon Mendel, a refugee from Nazism who founded Intercontinental Packers (now Mitchell's Gourmet Foods, a unit of Maple Leaf Foods) and announced in 1960 that in celebration of his 20th anniversary in Saskatoon, he would give the city money to establish a public art museum. His gift was matched by the Province of Saskatchewan. In 1965 he also donated 15 works by the Group of Seven which became the nucleus of the permanent collection. The modernist building, which opened on October 16, 1964, was designed by the Winnipeg architectural firm Blankstein, Coop, Gillmor and Hanna of Winnipeg (now numberTEN architectural group), led by partner-in-charge Al Hanna and design architect Doug Gillmor, who won the design contest. The Civic Conservatory was built as part of the same project, at the suggestion of the then mayor, S. L. Buckwold. The building was extended in 1975.

On September 18, 2006, the gallery suffered smoke and water damage from an early morning fire in the loading dock area. It reopened nine weeks later with increased focus on national and international art.

In 2009, the Board of Trustees of the Mendel Art Gallery decided to replace the building, which had come to be too small and needed expensive upgrades, with a larger facility on a different site. A new gallery, associated with the Remai Arts Centre, was opened at River Landing, in south downtown Saskatoon, named the Remai Modern Art Gallery of Saskatchewan for the Frank and Ellen Remai Foundation, the major donors. The design, by Kuwabara Payne McKenna Blumberg Architects and Smith Carter Architects and Engineers, won the 2011 Canadian Architect Award of Excellence. The opening date was originally to be 2015 but was later postponed to 2017. The decision to close the Mendel Gallery and replace it, which superseded earlier plans for expansion, was controversial. Former mayor Henry Dayday called for a plebiscite on the new gallery, and made it part of his short-lived bid for re-election in 2012.

The gallery closed its doors on June 7, 2015, to begin the transition to the Remai Modern. The City of Saskatoon approved plans for the Children's Discovery Museum to move into the Mendel Art Gallery Building after the new art gallery opens. In early 2019 the Children's Discovery Museum was rebranded as the Nutrien Wonderhub and opened in the old gallery's space in June 2019.
