= Ray Parker (painter) =

American painter (1922-1990)

- Born: 22 August 1922
- Died: 14 April 1990 (aged 67)
- Education: University of Iowa
- Known for: Painting
- Movement: Abstract expressionism

Raymond Parker (1922-1990) was an American Abstract expressionist painter who also is associated with Color Field painting and Lyrical Abstraction. Ray Parker was an influential art teacher and an important Color Field painter and an instrumental figure in the movement coined by Clement Greenberg called Post-Painterly Abstraction.

== Biography ==
Originally from South Dakota, Ray Parker entered the University of Iowa in Iowa City in 1940; he earned his MFA in 1948. From 1948 to 1951 he taught painting at the University of Minnesota in Minneapolis. During the 1940s his paintings were heavily influenced by cubism. In the early 1950s, however, Parker became associated with the leading abstract expressionists of the day, including Mark Rothko and Willem de Kooning. Parker soon began to simplify and refine his works realizing that through abstraction, and color his paintings could convey and express emotion.

Like Piet Mondrian, Stuart Davis and Jackson Pollock, Parker was a fan of jazz music; and his interest in Jazz, combined with his interest in abstract expressionism, led to his improvised painting style. Parker was also a great admirer of the painter Henri Matisse and he looked to this artist’s work for inspiration in terms of color and form, especially in his paintings of the 1970s and 1980s. By the late 1950s, he taught at Hunter College in New York City and he developed a singular style of painting that focused on intense color and simple geometric shapes. He was represented by the Samuel M. Kootz Gallery, one of the leading contemporary galleries in New York City during the late 1950s through the mid-1960s. At that time the Kootz Gallery represented important living artists such as Pablo Picasso, Pierre Soulages, Hans Hofmann, Zao Wou Ki as well as Ray Parker.

He is best known by his work of the late 1950s early 1960s called his Simple Paintings. These paintings are characterized by discreet cloudlike forms of clear, and intense color set against a white or an off-white background. Parker’s paintings utilizing this method of stacked, clearly colored lozenges and floating forms are straightforward and basically geometric in shape. Ray Parker's works relate to and predict the minimalist and Color Field paintings of the 1960s, made popular by American artists such as Morris Louis, Friedel Dzubas, Jules Olitski, Kenneth Noland, Helen Frankenthaler, and Ellsworth Kelly.

== Selected public collections ==
- Albright–Knox Art Gallery, Buffalo, NY
- Governor Nelson A. Rockefeller Empire State Plaza Art Collection, Albany, NY
- The Hyde Collection, Glens Falls, NY
- Los Angeles County Museum of Art, Los Angeles, CA
- Phillips Collection, Washington, DC
- Solomon R. Guggenheim Museum, New York, NY
- Whitney Museum of American Art, New York, NY

== See also ==
- Post-Painterly Abstraction
- Abstract expressionism
- Lyrical Abstraction
- Color Field painting
