= Sherron Francis =

American painter (born 1940)

- Born: 1940 (age 85–86); Downers Grove, Illinois, U.S.
- Education: Kansas City Art Institute, Indiana University
- Movement: Abstract expressionism, Color field, Lyrical abstraction

Sherron Francis (born 1940) is an American artist known for abstract expressionist and color field paintings in a mode that some critics call lyrical abstraction. During a career that began in 1969, she showed frequently in the galleries of New York and other cities. Reviewers described her paintings as "calming, celestial forms" and one said they were "alive with a variety of evanescent hues and tints". During the height of her career, she made sales to prominent collectors and saw her works added to major public collections. Late in her career, she made wall-mounted works in clay and, especially, wood. A critic said the latter had dynamic balance, "as if indicating arrested motion".

Francis began art studies at the University of Oklahoma in 1958. She subsequently earned an undergraduate degree from the Kansas City Institute of Art and a Master of Fine Arts degree from Indiana University. Taking advice from Dan Christensen, who was a friend and fellow student, she moved to Manhattan to begin her professional career in 1968. She showed figurative paintings in her first solo exhibition, held at the Bowery Gallery in 1970. Three years later, she transitioned to abstractions that one critic said created "pictorial force and unity through the action of sheer color". Over the next ten years, the paintings she made in this style often drew praise from critics. One of her last exhibitions of this period was a show assembled by the art historian and author Jack Flam called "Artists Choose Artists". As the title suggests, paintings by Francis appeared in the exhibition at the request of one or more of the sixteen participating artists, a group that included Carl Andre, Jim Dine, Brice Marden, Larry Poons, Richard Serra, and Frank Stella.

Throughout her career, Francis has followed her own lead, taking part fully in the New York art scene much of the time and withdrawing when it has suited her to do so. When, in the mid-1980s, art sales began to fall off, she faced a choice: either change her style to conform to new tastes or, as one reviewer put it, "extricate herself from the game". Opting for the latter, she decided to seek ways to support herself as her own boss. Over the next few decades, she purchased and successfully operated a succession of commercial fishing boats, made exotic wood trellises for sale in a Manhattan home design store, and ran a shop selling antiques. Of her time spent fishing, she told an interviewer, "I was an artist before, but I was broke, and I like to eat. At first, the days [spent fishing] seemed very long, but it's wonderful. It's like being on a vacation."

In 2022, the Lincoln Glenn Gallery mounted a retrospective exhibition of paintings made during the height of her career. The show drew lengthy reviews. One says, "Many important women abstractionists are finally receiving the attention they deserve for their place in the history of art (like Lynne Drexler and Elaine de Kooning), and Sherron Francis should be no exception." Speaking of the show, Francis told an interviewer, “It's a wonderful thing. It doesn't usually happen this way.”

== Early life and training ==
Francis decided to make a career in art after taking drawing classes during two years of study at the University of Oklahoma. She transferred from there to the Kansas City Art Institute in 1960 where she took classes in its interior design program but later elected to major in fine art. She graduated with a Bachelor of Fine Arts degree two years later. At the Institute, her instructors included William Bailey, an artist and art teacher known for his still life and figurative paintings, and the artist James McGarrell, whose complex paintings were said to "walk the dreamlike borderland between reality and abstraction." While studying in Kansas City, she established a friendship with the artist, Dan Christensen, that would continue through her career. She enrolled in the fine arts department of Indiana University in 1963 and graduated three years later with a Master of Fine Arts degree. After leaving Bloomington, Francis taught art for two years at Eastern Michigan University in Ypsilanti. In 1968, then practically destitute, she rented a sixth-floor loft on the eastern fringe of Greenwich Village in order to devote herself full-time to a career as a professional artist.

== Career in art ==
While still a student, Francis participated in shows at local galleries and in exhibitions at large institutions such as the Speed Art Museum and Evansville Museum, as well as university galleries in Indiana, Kentucky, North Dakota, and Michigan. During these years, she painted mainly still lifes and figures. She later said she particularly favored nude male models because she perceived more "going on in the inside of their forms" than in other models. When, in 1966, she exhibited a life-size painting of a standing nude at the University of North Dakota, an outraged citizen threatened to slash the work if it was not taken down. The school moved the painting to a secure location and made it available for viewing on request. Later that year, she won an award for a still life at the annual Indiana Artists exhibition in the John Herron Art Institute, Indianapolis.

After moving to New York at the beginning of her career, Francis helped to found a cooperative exhibition space called the Bowery Gallery. In 1969, she contributed paintings to a group show there and received her first solo exhibition at the gallery in 1970. At this time, she decided to switch from figurative work to abstraction. She later said her inability to pay model fees was the main reason for her change, but she was also then in close contact with artists who were also committed to abstraction and she saw their work regularly. These artists included men associated with abstract expressionism, color field painting, and lyrical abstraction, such as Walter Darby Bannard, Michael Steiner, Peter Young, Larry Zox, and Larry Poons. In 1973, she was given her first solo in a commercial gallery. Christensen, who was exhibiting at a New York gallery known for its commitment to abstract art, had introduced her to the gallery's owner, André Emmerich. The show, which ran for a month during January and February, drew a favorable review from Peter Schjeldahl in the New York Times. Describing the paintings as "stained and brushed to a suavely grainy texture", each of them floating in "an area of wan, soft color in a somewhat less-intensely colored field," Schjeldahl said Francis aimed to "ravish" the viewer with works that were "as gorgeous and as delicate as possible." Francis showed at the Whitney Biennial later that year, and Emmerich gave her a second solo during the one that followed. One source says that during this period, the gallery was able to sell more than sixty of her paintings.

From 1974 to the end of the decade, her paintings appeared in New York and regional galleries in both solo and group exhibitions, including solos at the Tibor de Nagy Gallery in 1978 and 1980. When a gallery in Seattle included Francis in a group that included Andy Warhol, Robert Rauschenberg, and Josef Albers, a critic said two of her paintings, "Slate Hill" and "Blue Stone", were "perhaps the most visually and sensually pleasing paintings in the show." A year later, the New York Times reported that "New York's art market, the largest and most varied in the world, is feeling the effects of the recession. The go‐go spree of the past few years is over." An article in the April 1977 issue of Art Forum declared, "Art sales are declining and there is an air of pessimism. The sense of opulence of the ’60s has gone to dust." No longer able to support herself through art sales, Francis, as one writer said, "extricated herself from the game" rather than trying to adapt her style to please reluctant collectors. Characteristically, she chose an independent path to supplant her disappearing income. In 1978, she began working her first fishing boat from a village in North Fork on the eastern tip of Long Island. The area was a familiar one since she had previously used it for summertime retreats from the city art world. Using a succession of boats, she continued to harvest shellfish and other sea life until, in the latter part of the 1980s, an algae bloom called the "brown tide" combined with overfishing caused the industry to decline. In the early 1990s, Francis began a business selling custom-made wooden trellises via a home design store in the SoHo neighborhood of Manhattan. In 2000, she began another business. Located in the North Fork village of Aquebogue and called Small Holdings Farm, it was—and remained in 2023—a country antique store.

Five years after she had shifted her career from art to fishing, Francis was invited to take part in an exhibition conceived by the art historian Jack Flam. In arranging the show, he had asked several prominent artists, including Carl Andre, Jim Dines, Brice Marden, Larry Poons, and Frank Stella, to be its curators. A critic for the New York Times said the artist-curators did well and the small show included "very strong work". Apart from a few appearances in group shows at the Douglas Drake Gallery and in university galleries, Francis's work was not shown again until 2022 when an art appraiser, Eli Sternglass, discovered some of her paintings at an auction and, with business partner Douglas Gold, requested Francis to show paintings in a retrospective exhibition to be held in the Lincoln Glenn Gallery of Larchmont, New York. In a lengthy review of the show, Clanci Jo Conover said the exhibition of twenty-two canvases reintroduced Francis's work to the public and marked a new period in her career. In 2024, Francis received a second solo exhibition at Lincoln Glenn. Entitled, "Sherron Francis, Splash of Serenity; Paintings, 1973-77" it was mounted in the gallery's new location at 542 West 24th Street in Manhattan.

== Style and technique ==
(1) Sherron Francis, Coosa 1972, acrylic on canvas, 65 1/2 x 44 1/2 inches

(2) Sherron Francis, Befit, 1979, acrylic and mixed media on canvas, 79 x 67 inches

(3) Sherron Francis, Red Peak, 1979, acrylic and mixed media on canvas, 37 x 28 inches

(4) Sherron Francis, Pete's Neck, 1981, acrylic on canvas, 34 1/2 x 22 inches

Francis transitioned from figuration to abstraction not long after arriving in New York. Her earliest abstract paintings were small works on pre-stretched canvases done in oil-based paints. In 1972, she began making larger works using acrylics. A few years later, during the height of her career, critics placed Francis within the second generation of abstract expressionists who made color field paintings in a style they called lyrical abstraction.

Francis gave special focus to edges as transitions that affect the eye in a variety of ways. She investigated how color itself can produce planar implications rather than just changes in hue. The underlayers visible at the edges of the central shapes can seem either illusionistic or decoratively frame-like. Francis thought about the atmospheric and spatial results from soft or hard contours as well as from various color relationships.

— Lisa Peters, Sherron Francis; A Retrospective: September 10–October 13, 2022 (Lincoln Glenn Gallery, Larchmont, NY, 2022)

When working on large canvases, she would lay a sheet of fabric on the floor and, using squeegees, would spread water-based acrylic pigments across the surface. She kept the paint thin so that, as one writer said, the viewer could see the weave. To mount them, Francis would cut the large sheets into rectangles. In the words of Lisa Peters, author of the catalog for her 2022 retrospective exhibition, the compositions that she produced in this manner created "monumentality" and guided "the viewer's eye to a painting's upper register", giving the paintings "a spiritual dimension." Peters also said Francis "often set horizontal shapes within horizontal spaces, creating a more meditative feeling by holding the viewer's eye in the middle ground."

She was not the only color field artist to use squeegees. Her friend, Dan Christensen, had begun using them at about the same time she did and, during the 1970s, Helen Frankenthaler also used them, as did Jules Olitski. Despite these similarities in technique, her paintings were not seen to derive from theirs. Reviewing her 2022 retrospective, a critic said she avoided "being derivative of earlier abstractionists". While her work was stylistically grouped with the work of artists she knew, such as Frankenthaler, Olitski, and Christensen, the critics who reviewed her shows did not suggest that her paintings showed their influence. In 2022, Francis herself said that while she admired paintings made by Jack Bush, Kenneth Noland, and Olitski, she could think of no artist from whom she drew inspiration.

Reviewers described her paintings as having "calming, celestial forms", with evanescent hues and tints", and a "gentle Oriental sensibility". One called them "mystical", saying the layers of their color tones, "suggest a push through to other not yet manifested images." Another said she "probed the elusive attributes of color to reveal its suggestions of planes and depths."

Describing a painting called "Coosa" of 1972, a critic said Francis's goal was to "'draw with paint', allowing the motion to direct the composition." Of this painting, the critic also said its "lavender tones" espoused "an air of tranquility." See Image No 1, above.

During the 1970s, she switched from bright hues to a more subdued palette and toward the end of the decade, she began to apply layers of impasto to her canvases. In 1978, a reviewer described her paintings of that time as having "clean, smooth curves of pure color against a densely mottled, deeply stained background texture." At about this time, she began mixing gravel into her pigments and using spray guns to create random effects.

A critic described Francis's "Befit" (1979) as having a "core image", "painted in edgy vertical strokes and dabs of purple" that emerged "from the multitoned ocher surface with all the glower of a storm cloud on a sunlit day." See Image No. 2, above.

In discussing the painting called "Red Peak" (1979), a critic discussed Francis's use of commercial insulation gravel by "mixing chunks with paint and applying it to a canvas", adding that "this effect formed a crust-like appearance and texture, adding an element of depth and tactility to her work." See Image No. 3, above.

In 2022, Lisa Peters wrote that in making the relatively late painting "Pete's Neck" (1981), Francis "used pouring rather than squeegees, letting the paint flow slowly so that shapes emerged, which she then at times touched up with light brush handling." See Image No. 4, above.

== Wall mounted works ==
In a group show appearing at New York's Martin Gerard Gallery in 1982, Francis exhibited wall-mounted works fashioned in clay. A reviewer described them as three-dimensional paintings, saying the compositions were "squeegee-produced in a seemingly spontaneous manner." She had been making these constructions since about 1980 as a member of the Clayworks Studio Workshop. Set up by Susan Harnly Peterson in the 1970s, the workshop was a nonprofit organization that provided studio space for artists to experiment with artistic uses of clay. In 1981, a four-artist exhibition at the Houston location of the Tibor de Nagy Gallery included some of her first clay pieces. A critic described them as "ceramic plaques, in which rough edges and sandy textures add the kind of body that her work [on canvas] calls out for."

In 1991, at an outdoor sculpture exhibition in Port Jefferson, Long Island, Francis exhibited wall-mounted works in painted wood. A reviewer for the New York Times said these pieces were "arranged in loosely geometric configurations that recall the polychrome reliefs of early American modernists like Gertrude Greene." When she showed again in that location the following year, Times critic Helen A. Harrison said the sculptures had dynamic balance, "as if indicating arrested motion, although in the opposite direction from Marcel Duchamp's 'Nude Descending a Staircase', that other, more widely known 'explosion in a shingle factory.'" She added, "Ms. Francis implies that her forms express the striving to be free of gravity. Pushing up and away from the walls, they seem to be on the verge of flight." Reviewing a show held in 1993, another critic described the constructions as "various-size slabs of wood lightly stained with color and fixed together in a kind of fan shape, or longer, thinner shapes whitened and varnished and bunched up as if they were a bundle of sticks arrested in flight."

== Art teacher ==
Francis was a teaching assistant while enrolled at Indiana University between 1964 and 1966. Her friend Dan Christensen was a fellow student and TA for at least part of that time. She was an art instructor at Eastern Michigan University in Ypsilanti, Michigan, for the next two years. For 13 years, beginning in 1981, she taught at the Ridgewood School of Art and Design in Ridgewood, New Jersey. She was a visiting instructor at Cooper Union in 1978.

== Personal life and family ==
Francis was born in Downers Grove, Illinois, in 1940. Her father, Lyle W. Francis (1907-1985), was a telephone company supervisor. Her mother, Evelyn M. Francis (1905-1997), was a schoolteacher before the birth of her first child.

Francis graduated from Downers Grove Community High School in 1958. She was a National Honor Society scholar, a member of the student council, and an active participant in a variety of school activities. As a student at the University of Oklahoma in the fall of 1958, she was elected president of her sorority pledge class. While studying design at the Kansas City Art Institute, she helped put on the Greater Kansas City Home Furnishing Exposition of 1960, and, in 1962, while studying art, she received a cash award at the school's Honors Day ceremony.

During her years in Manhattan, she and her friends would drive to eastern Long Island to shop at tag sales. In 2020, she told an interviewer that they could fill up the back of a pickup truck with low-priced purchases and items left out on the street. She added: "People used to put things in the garbage that were really great—all kinds of painted furniture, which we would take back to the city and take all the paint off" to resell. When she moved to North Fork permanently in 2000, she bought a building in a hamlet called Aquebogue that she calls Small Holdings Farm and that she operates as an antiques store. Asked how long she planned to stay in the business, she said, "How long do I think I'll do it for? Depends on how long I live."

In 1978, Francis had begun to supplement her dwindling income from art sales through sales of fish and other seafood she caught while operating a commercial fishing boat off the coast of the North Fork region of Long Island. The "Selma", a 43-foot stern trawler, was the third and, in 1994, the largest boat she owned and operated. That year, she told an interviewer, "At first, the days seemed very long but it's wonderful. It's like being on a vacation." With the decline of the fishery in the late 1980s or early 1990s, she transitioned to making artistic wooden trellises that she sold through a store in Manhattan. In 1992, a reporter described the trellises as handmade items that were a "terrific addition to any backyard". Francis told the author she began the business after she found a vintage trellis in a local flea market.
