= André Emmerich =

German-born American gallerist

- Born: October 11, 1924; Frankfurt, Germany
- Died: September 25, 2007 (aged 82); New York City, US
- Occupation: Art dealer

André Emmerich (October 11, 1924 – September 25, 2007) was a German-born American gallerist who specialized in the color field school and pre-Columbian art while also taking on artists such as David Hockney and John D. Graham.

== Early life and education ==
Emmerich was born in Frankfurt, Germany, to Lily (née Marx) and Hugo Emmerich. His grandfather was an art dealer who collected for J. P. Morgan. His Jewish family fled to Amsterdam when he was seven. They immigrated to Queens, New York in 1940. He graduated with a BA in history from Oberlin College in 1944. For ten years he lived in Paris, where he was a writer and editor, working at Réalités and Connaissance des Arts magazines, the Paris edition of The New York Herald Tribune and Time-Life International.

== Art dealer ==
Robert Motherwell introduced Emmerich to "the small group of eccentric painters we now know as the New York Abstract Expressionist School". During the second half of the 20th century the Emmerich Gallery was located in New York City and since 1959 in the Fuller Building at 41 East 57th Street and in the 1970s also at 420 West Broadway in Manhattan and in Zürich, Switzerland.

The gallery displayed leading artists working in a wide variety of styles including Abstract Expressionism, Op Art, Color field painting, Hard-edge painting, Lyrical Abstraction, Minimal Art, Pop Art and Realism, among other movements. He organized important exhibitions of pre-Columbian art and wrote two acclaimed books, "Art Before Columbus" (1963) and "Sweat of the Sun and Tears of the Moon: Gold and Silver in Pre-Columbian Art" (1965), on the subject.

In addition to David Hockney, and John D. Graham the gallery represented many internationally known artists and estates including; Hans Hofmann, Morris Louis, Helen Frankenthaler, Kenneth Noland, Sam Francis, Sir Anthony Caro, Jules Olitski, Jack Bush, John Hoyland, Alexander Liberman, Al Held, Anne Ryan, Miriam Schapiro, Paul Brach, Herbert Ferber, Esteban Vicente, Friedel Dzubas, Neil Williams, Theodoros Stamos, Anne Truitt, Karel Appel, Pierre Alechinsky, Larry Poons, Larry Zox, Ronnie Landfield, Dan Christensen, Sherron Francis, Stanley Boxer, Pat Lipsky, Robert Natkin, Judy Pfaff, John Harrison Levee, William H. Bailey, Dorothea Rockburne, Nancy Graves, John McLaughlin, Ed Moses, Beverly Pepper, and Piero Dorazio, among others.

While managing the gallery, Emmerich appeared as the imposter of a wine expert on the April 1, 1963 episode of the game show To Tell the Truth.

Between 1982 and 1996, Emmerich ran a 150-acre sculpture park called Top Gallant in Pawling, New York, on his country estate that once was a Quaker farm. There he displayed large-scale works by, among others, Alexander Calder, Beverly Pepper, Bernar Venet, Tony Rosenthal, Isaac Witkin, Mark di Suvero, and George Rickey, as well as the work of younger artists like Keith Haring.

The cottage's in-ground pool had walls painted with ocean waves by Hockney. Many of the pieces later left for museums, including the Museum of Fine Arts, Houston, Storm King Art Center, and the Detroit Institute of Arts.

In 1996, Sotheby's bought the Andre Emmerich Gallery, with the aim of handling artists' estates. One year later the Josef and Anni Albers Foundation, the main beneficiary of the Albers' estates, did not renew its three-year contract. The gallery was eventually closed by Sotheby's in 1998.

== Personal life ==
Emmerich had three children with his first wife Constance Marantz. His sons are: Adam Emmerich, a lawyer at Wachtell, Lipton, Rosen & Katz, producer Toby Emmerich, and actor Noah Emmerich. He died following a stroke in Manhattan on September 25, 2007, aged 82.

== Legacy ==
André Emmerich's papers and gallery records were donated to the Archives of American Art between 1999 and 2002. Two additional accretions were donated by Emmerich's wife Susanne in 2008 and 2009, and another by James Yohe, Emmerich's former business partner, in 2009.

== Bibliography ==
- Emmerich, André (1965). Sweat of the sun and tears of the moon : gold and silver in pre-Columbian art. Seattle: University of Washington Press.
- — (August 1996). "Abloom with art". The Atlantic Monthly. 278 (2): 32–35.
