= List of American artists =

A list by date of birth of historically recognized American fine artists known for the creation of artworks that are primarily visual in nature, including traditional media such as painting, sculpture, photography, and printmaking, as well as more recent genres, including installation art, performance art, body art, conceptual art, video art, and digital art.

For ease of use the list has been subdivided, and can be found at:

- List of American artists before 1900
- List of American artists 1900 and after

== See also ==
- American art
- Native American artists
- African American art
- Sculpture of the United States
- Feminist art movement
- Hudson River School
- Luminism
- American impressionism
- Ashcan School
- Precisionism
- American scene painting
- Regionalism
- WPA Federal Art Project
- Northwest School
- Abstract expressionism
- Pop art
- Happenings
- Fluxus
- Intermedia
- Hard-edge painting
- Minimalism
- Post-painterly abstraction
- Color field
- Post-minimalism
- Process art
- Site-specific art
- Earth art
- Lyrical abstraction
- Photo realism
- Conceptual art
- Postmodernism
- Digital art
