= Kikuo Saito =

American painter

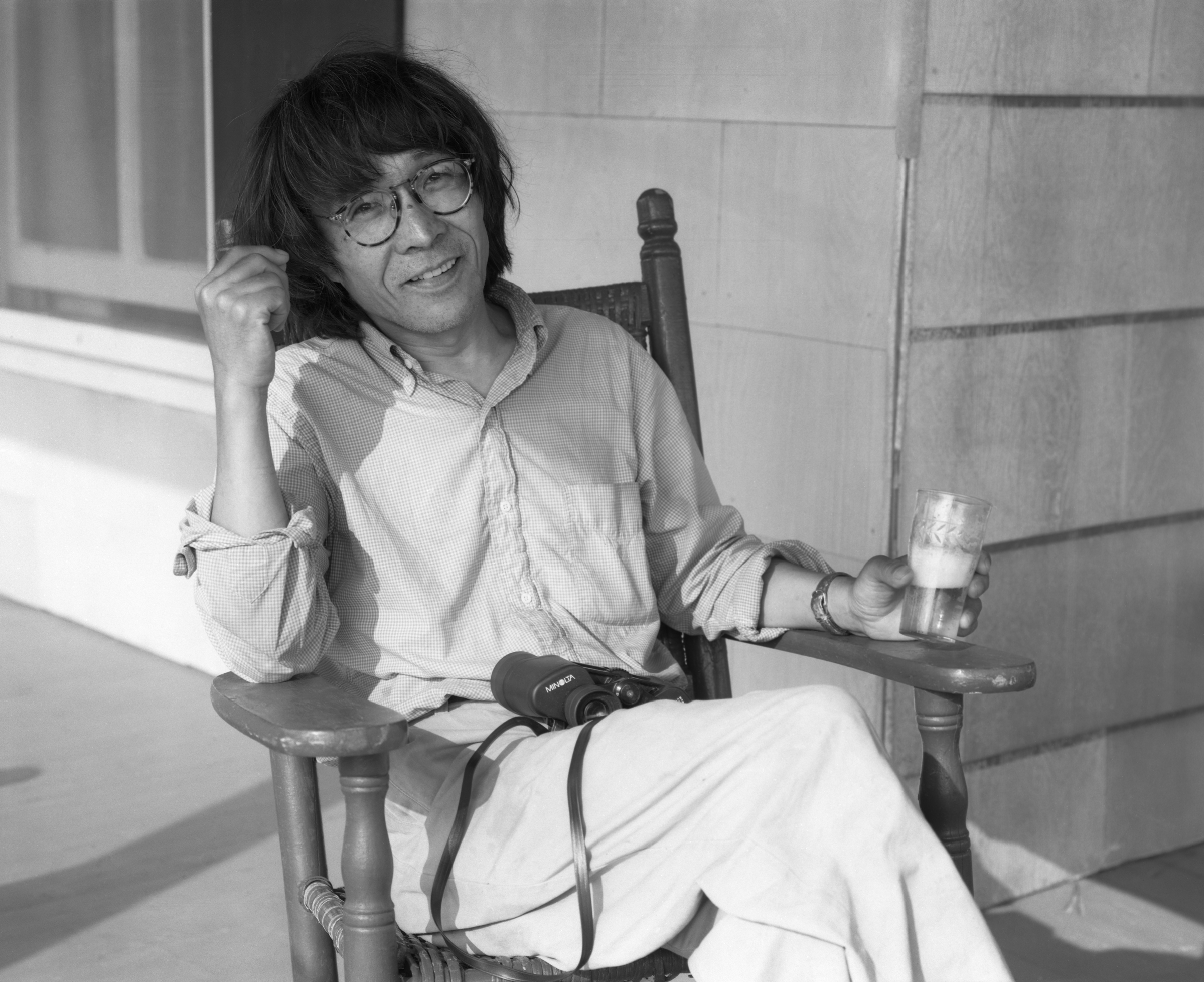
Kikuo Saito, 1990

Kikuo Saito (斉藤規矩夫, Saitō Kikuo; 1939–2016) was a Japanese-born American abstract painter with ties to the Color Field movement and Lyrical abstraction. A former assistant to Helen Frankenthaler, Kenneth Noland, and Larry Poons, Saito's work infuses richly saturated colorscapes with delicately drawn lines. Saito was the creator of sui generis theatre and dance events, collaborating with innovative directors and choreographers Robert Wilson, Peter Brook, Jerome Robbins, and dancer and choreographer Eva Maier, to whom he was married for several decades. His productions combined wordless drama in the poetic frameworks of light, costumes, music, and dance, most of which he devised and directed himself.

== Early life and education ==
Kikuo Saito was born in Tokyo in 1939. He began painting when he was 17 years old, and worked for 3 years as a proctor and studio technician at the workshop of Sensei Itoh, an established Japanese painter. During this time, Saito gained an understanding of both the traditional arts of Japan as well as contemporary movements such as the Gutai Group. He also had an interest in the burgeoning New York City art world and movements such as Abstract Expressionism, Minimalism, Color Field, and Pop Art.

Saito moved to New York in 1966 at the age of 27. The journey across the United States to New York provided him a chance meeting with Ellen Stewart, founder of La MaMa Experimental Theatre Club, whom he would later describe as his American mother. Once in New York, Saito worked with Stewart at La MaMa and was instrumental in bringing Japanese avant-garde dramatist Shuji Terayama to La MaMa in 1980. In his early years in New York, Saito balanced painting with theatre, supporting himself with carpentry and working on loft build-outs in Soho.

== Career ==
=== Painting ===
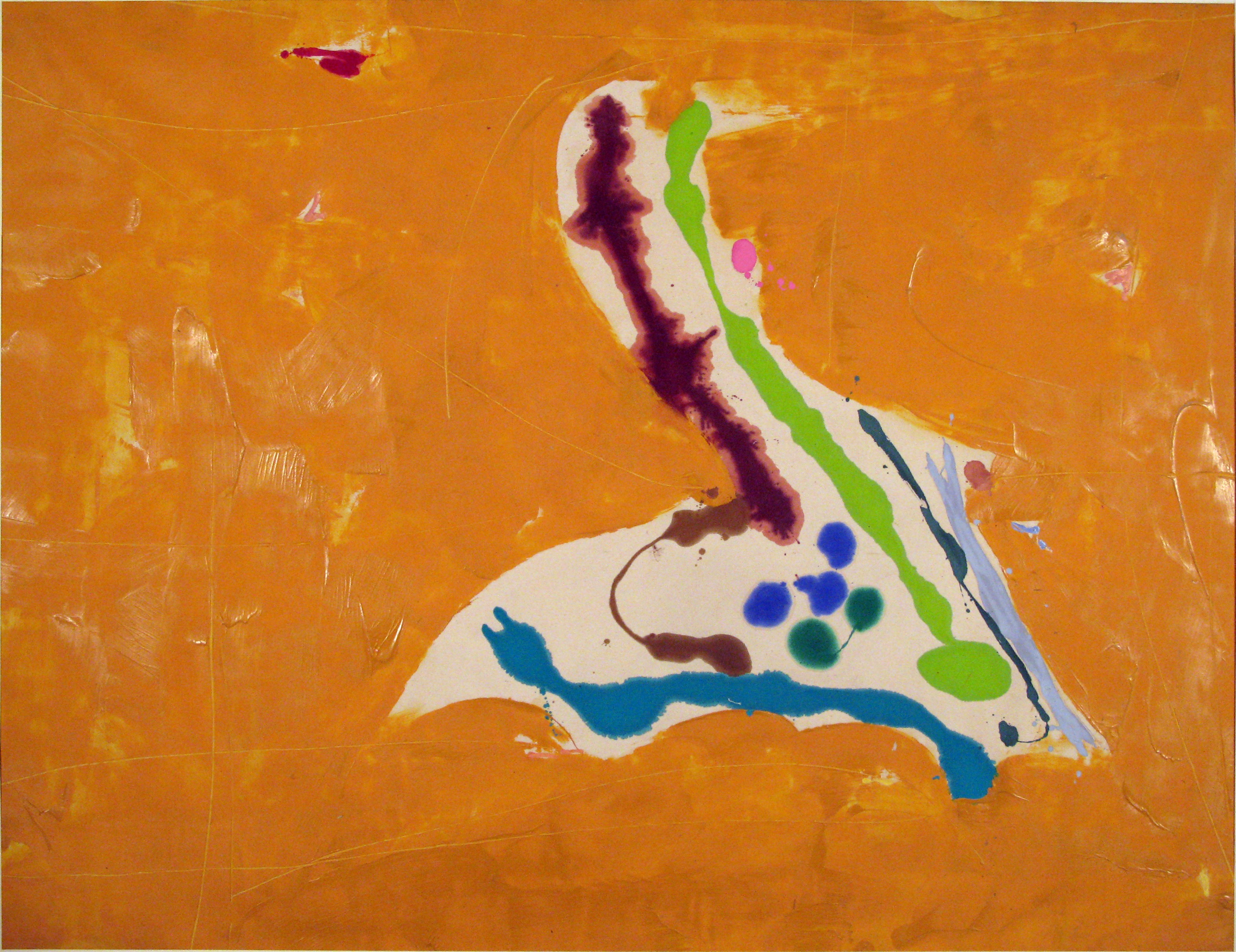
Island and Piano, oil on canvas

The composition of many of Saito's paintings was significantly influenced by and in dialogue with the geography of his theatre productions. Saito's dualistic nature took material form in the interplay between the collaborative theatre and the private realm of the painting studio. Art critic Karen Wilkin wrote that "if we are attentive, we discover that characters from his stage pieces have been reincarnated as abstract configurations within his paintings, reborn as the records of animated gestures that retain the individuality of their sources."

A commonality in the entire body of Saito's work, both on stage or on canvas, focuses on written signs. Repeated investigations of alphabet in Saito's work, both real and made-up, legible and obscured, speak to moments in his personal history. As a young immigrant in a country whose language he did not speak, Saito wrote space for himself in the already-established Color Field tradition by constructing his own painterly lexicon. Opposing motifs of free gestural brushstrokes and elegant, ordered lettering allude again to his double practice as painter and architect of poetic performance. Abstraction in Saito's work points to a meditation on the instabilities and impermanence of language and the mutability of meaning. A space opens once departing from structuralist systems of transmuting signs, and Saito fills that space with vibrant color.

=== Theatre ===
Saito worked with actors and dancers, devising, directing, and creating the decor and costumes for stage performances, sometimes collaborating with Wilson, Brook, and Maier. He drew inspiration from Japanese theatrical traditions of Kabuki and Noh plays, and was an innovator with water and other nontraditional materials onstage. He designed sets for numerous productions at La MaMa and for the Festival of Two Worlds in Spoleto, Italy. He collaborated with Wilson on projects in Shiraz, Iran, and in Paris created the set for Brook's Conference of the Birds.

In 1996 he was the artist-in-residence at Duke University, where in collaboration with Maier he created the conceptual, wordless performance Toy Garden, which would later be performed at La MaMa. Saito said Toy Garden was about what he imagined in the missing half of Vittore Carpaccio's painting "Two Venetian Ladies," a work with a famously-missing left side.

== Exhibitions ==
Saito had his first solo exhibition at Deitcher O'Reilly Gallery on 67th Street in 1976. He would go on to exhibit both solo and group shows in the United States, Europe, and Japan. He is represented in collections in the Museum of Modern Art, the Whitney Museum of American Art, the Aldrich Contemporary Art Museum, and numerous private collections. An exhibition called "The Final Years", featuring work made in the year leading up to Saito's death, opened at the Leslie Feely Fine Art Gallery on East 68th Street in New York City from September 15 - October 14, 2016.

In 2014, Saito and his partner Mikiko Ino purchased the former St. Patrick's School property in Verplanck, New York and recommissioned it as KinoSaito, a multidisciplinary nonprofit museum and art space projected to open to the public in 2020

== Selected museum collections ==
- Modern and Contemporary Art | The Museum of Fine Arts, Houston
- The Aldrich Contemporary Art Museum, Ridgefield, Connecticut
- Nasher Museum of Art, Duke University, Durham, North Carolina
- Art Gallery of Alberta, Alberta, Canada
- Kitchener-Waterloo Art Gallery, Ontario, Canada
- The Museum of Modern Art, New York, New York
- Museum of Art, Fort Lauderdale, Nova Southeastern University, Fort Lauderdale, Florida
- Queens University, Ontario, Canada
- John and Mable Ringling Museum of Art, Sarasota, Florida
- Peter Stuyvesant Foundation, Netherlands
- Ulster Museum, Northern Ireland
- University of Lethbridge, Alberta, Canada

== Theatrical productions ==
- 1965 setting for modern dance, an early collaborations with Toshiro Ogawa Lighting Designer at Waseda University, Tokyo
- 1966 setting for modern dance with LD Toshiro Ogawa, Iino Hall, Tokyo
- 1967 set designed for Tom Eyen's Sara B. Divine, Spoleto Festival, Spoleto, Italy
- 1967 set for Tom Paine directed by Tom O'Horgan, La MaMa Experimental Theatre Club, New York, New York
- 1967 set for Rochelle Owens' Futz directed by Tom O'Horgan, La MaMa Experimental Theatre Club, New York, New York
- 1972 worked on sets for Robert Wilson's theatre piece at 6th Festival of the Arts, Shiraz, Iran
- 1972 work done on sets for Robert Wilson, Opera Comique, Paris
- 1972 wrote and directed film for National Television, Iran
- 1973 Haftan, theatre piece at Byrd Hoffman Foundation, New York (rehearsal/workshop at La MaMa Experimental Theatre Club)
- 1976 Water Play, theatre piece at La MaMa Experimental Theatre Club, New York, New York
- 1979 set for Peter Brook's Conference of the Birds, Paris
- 1996 Toy Garden, The Ark (Duke University), Durham, North Carolina
- 1996 Toy Garden, La MaMa Experimental Theatre Club, New York, New York
- 2001 Ash Garden, LaGuardia High School, New York, New York
