= Leo Castelli =

Italian-American founder of contemporary art gallery system (1907–1999)

- Leo Castelli (seated), with artist Jasper Johns standing behind, c. 1970s
- Born: Leo Krausz; September 4, 1907; Trieste, Austrian Littoral, Austria-Hungary
- Died: August 21, 1999 (aged 91); New York City, United States
- Spouse(s): Ileana Sonnabend (m. 1933; div. 1959) Antoinette Fraisseix du Bost (m.1963, died 1987) Barbara Bertozzi (m. 1995)
- Children: 2

Leo Castelli (né Krausz; September 4, 1907 – August 21, 1999) was an Italian-American art dealer who originated the contemporary art gallery system. His gallery showcased contemporary art for five decades. Among the movements shown were Surrealism, abstract expressionism, Neo-Dada, pop art, op art, color field painting, hard-edge painting, lyrical abstraction, minimalism, conceptual art, and neo-expressionism.

== Early life and career ==
Leo Castelli was born Leo Krausz, in Trieste, Austria-Hungary, the second of three children of Italian and Austro-Hungarian Jewish origin. His father was Ernest Krauss, a Hungarian by birth, who had gone to Trieste as a young man and married wealthy heiress Bianca Castelli, from an established family of coffee importers. After World War I, which the family spent in Vienna (where Leo Castelli learned perfect German), they returned to Trieste. The family changed its name to "Krausz-Castelli" and then "Castelli" in the mid-1930s, when Benito Mussolini's government required names to be Italianized.

After earning a law degree at the University of Milan in 1924, Castelli returned to Trieste, where his father had secured a job for him with an insurance company. In 1932, he went to work for an insurance company in Bucharest, where he married Ileana Schapira one year later. After their wedding, the couple honeymooned in Vienna and bought their first artwork, a Matisse watercolor.

Castelli's father-in-law, Mihai Schapira, helped him to be transferred in 1935 to the Banca d'Italia in Paris. There, Ileana's taste and money helped him start his first gallery at Place Vendôme in Paris, which was named for its co-director, the decorator René Drouin, and situated between the Ritz Hotel and the couturier Elsa Schiaparelli. Specializing in surrealistic art, the gallery opened in July 1939, with a show of modern and antique furniture, including commissioned pieces by Drouin, Max Ernst, Meret Oppenheim, Leonor Fini (a former girlfriend of Castelli's from Trieste), Eugene Berman, and other artists in the force field of Surrealism.

Ileana's connections enabled the couple to flee to the United States at the start of World War II. Castelli's parents did not escape but died in Budapest, hounded by members of Hungary's fascist Arrow Cross Party. The couple would remain married for more than 25 years, and were friends and partners even after their divorce, when Ileana married Michael Sonnabend and that couple opened its own gallery. Castelli arrived in the United States in 1941, by way of Marrakesh, Tangier, Algeciras, Vigo and Havana. He took graduate history courses in economic history at Columbia University until volunteering for the Army, serving in the intelligence service in Europe. After the liberation of France, he was sent to Bucharest as an interpreter for the Allied commission that controlled the city. As a result of Castelli's military service, he was given American citizenship. Returning to New York, Castelli took a managerial position with his father-in-law's clothing factory.

== Leo Castelli Gallery ==
In New York, the Castellis were two of only three non-artist members (the other was dealer Charles Egan) of the Club, an influential coterie founded in 1949 that included Willem de Kooning, Robert Rauschenberg, Franz Kline, and Ad Reinhardt. Castelli's first exercise as a private dealer came through Drouin, in 1947: some hundred canvases by Kandinsky, consigned by his widow, Nina. His first American curatorial effort was the Ninth Street Show of 1951, a seminal event in the emergence of Abstract Expressionism. He soon attached himself to the pioneering gallerist Sidney Janis, one of the early proponents of the school. In 1957, he opened the Leo Castelli Gallery in a townhouse at 4 E. 77th Street between Madison and Fifth Avenues in New York City. From the mid-1960s through the 1970s, the gallery was perhaps the most prominent commercial venue for art in the world. Initially the gallery showcased European Surrealism, Wassily Kandinsky, and other European artists such as François-Xavier Lalanne. However the gallery also exhibited American Abstract Expressionism. Jackson Pollock, Willem de Kooning, Cy Twombly, Friedel Dzubas, and Norman Bluhm were some artists who were included in group shows.

In 1958, Robert Rauschenberg and Jasper Johns joined the gallery, signaling a turning away from Abstract Expressionism, towards Pop Art, Minimalism and Conceptual Art.

Castelli Gallery's first Warhol exhibition, Flowers, November, 1964

From the early 1960s through the late 70s, Frank Stella, Larry Poons, Lee Bontecou, James Rosenquist, Roy Lichtenstein, Andy Warhol, Robert Morris, Donald Judd, Dan Flavin, Cy Twombly, Ronald Davis, Ed Ruscha, Salvatore Scarpitta, Richard Serra, Bruce Nauman, Lawrence Weiner and Joseph Kosuth joined the stable of Castelli artists. He gave Johns, Stella and Lichtenstein their first one-man shows. Castelli opened a temporary annex, the Castelli Warehouse, on West 108th Street, with a show organized by Robert Morris, of environmental sculpture by nine artists, including Nauman, Serra, and Eva Hesse. In 1971 Leo Castelli opened a downtown SoHo branch of the Leo Castelli Gallery at 420 West Broadway, in a building bought by the Hague Art Delivery Company and a cooperative of dealers: Castelli took the second floor; his former wife's Sonnabend Gallery took the third floor, and André Emmerich (later replaced by Charles Cowles) took the top floor; while John Weber, (former director of the Dwan Gallery) rented his gallery on the fourth floor. In the 1980s, Castelli opened a second larger downtown exhibition space at a 142 Greene Street also in SoHo. He later mounted joint shows with Mary Boone, of Julian Schnabel, in 1981, and David Salle, in 1982.

Castelli also pioneered a stipend system that was unknown in New York when he opened his gallery. He put his artists on a payroll whether or not their work sold. For this and other reasons, desertions were initially rare among his artists. When Castelli discovered Serra in 1967, for example, he offered him a guarantee of three years of monthly payments even though he did not expect to sell any of the unknown sculptor's lead-plate work in that time. Castelli also was known for spotting new talent and insisting on European exposure for his American artists, leading to Rauschenberg in 1964 becoming the first American to win the Venice Biennale's international grand prize in painting. His most important clients included Peter Ludwig and Giuseppe Panza.

Castelli's second wife, Antoinette Fraissex du Bost, opened Castelli Graphics, an art gallery devoted to the prints and photographs of Castelli Gallery and other artists. The couple also had a son together, Jean-Christophe Castelli, but Antoinette Castelli died in 1987. In 1995 Leo Castelli married the Italian art historian Barbara Bertozzi Castelli.

In 2015, Bertozzi Castelli opened a one-room satellite gallery at 1046 Madison Avenue, near 80th Street, with Robert Morris's installation Lead and Felt (1969).

== Recognition ==
Castelli received the rosette of the French Legion of Honor, allegedly in exchange for donating works by Johns to the Centre Pompidou. The mayor of Trieste made him the honorary director of the Revoltella Museum. In 1998, the National Arts Club awarded Castelli its Centennial Medal of Honor. On this occasion, Dennis Hopper called Castelli "the godfather of the contemporary art world."

In 1982 a traveling exhibit honoring the 25th anniversary of Castelli Gallery visited the La Jolla Museum of Contemporary Art. The Museum of Art, Fort Lauderdale, showed "Three Decades of Exploration: Homage to Leo Castelli", an exhibit of more than 30 works by artists discovered, shown and encouraged by Castelli in 1987. That same year, the Butler Institute of American Art presented "Leo Castelli: a tribute exhibition". In 1996, Gagosian Gallery mounted the exhibition "Leo Castelli: An Exhibition in Honor of His Gallery and Artists" in Beverly Hills.

== Legacy ==
Many artists have enshrined Castelli in their works. Elaine de Kooning and Richard Artschwager painted his portrait, Warhol made a silkscreen of him in a jacket and tie. Frank Stella named a work after him, in 1992 he posed for the French artist Klaus Guingand who immortalized his shadow, and a sculpture by Robert Morris, Leo, places a brain at the center of a target. In 1999, on the occasion of Castelli's death, Time published a eulogy by James Rosenquist.

In 1988, when there were no tax deductions for gifts to museums, Castelli gave one of the icons of postwar American art, Robert Rauschenberg's Bed (1955) to the Museum of Modern Art. In 1992, amid rumors that Castelli was negotiating to sell his archives to the Getty Center in Los Angeles, his collection was said to be worth some $2 million. In October 2007, Castelli's heirs – his widow, Barbara Bertozzi Castelli, and his two children, Jean-Christophe Castelli and Nina Castelli Sundell – announced the donation of the gallery's archives from 1957 through 1999 to the Smithsonian Institution's Archives of American Art. Castelli had been interviewed for the archive's oral-history project in 1969, 1973 and 1997.

The Leo Castelli Gallery continues to operate at 18 East 77th Street in New York under the direction of his wife showing many of the same artists from the gallery's past. The Leo Award, presented annually by the Independent Curators International (ICI), is named after the late Castelli.
