= Clement Greenberg =

American essayist and visual art critic (1909–1994)

- Born: Clement Greenberg; January 16, 1909; New York City, U.S.
- Died: May 7, 1994 (aged 85); New York City, U.S.
- Education: Syracuse University (A.B.)
- Movement: Abstract expressionism; post-painterly abstraction; color field painting

Clement Greenberg (/ˈɡriːnbɜːrɡ/) (January 16, 1909 – May 7, 1994), occasionally writing under the pseudonym K. Hardesh, was an American essayist known mainly as an art critic closely associated with American modern art of the mid-20th century and a formalist aesthetician. He is best remembered for his association with the art movement abstract expressionism and the painter Jackson Pollock.

== Early life ==
Clement Greenberg was born in the Bronx, New York City, in 1909. His parents were middle-class Jewish immigrants, and he was the eldest of their three sons. Since childhood, Greenberg sketched compulsively, until becoming a young adult, when he began to focus on literature. He attended Erasmus Hall High School, the Marquand School for Boys, and Syracuse University, graduating with an A.B. in 1930, cum laude, Phi Beta Kappa. He also attended classes at the Art Students League. After college, already fluent in Yiddish and English since childhood, Greenberg taught himself Italian and German in addition to French and Latin. Over the next few years, he traveled the U.S. working for his father's dry-goods business, but the work did not suit his inclinations, so he turned to working as a translator. Greenberg married in 1934, had a son the next year, and was divorced the year after that. In 1936, he took a series of jobs with the federal government, in the Civil Service Administration, the Veterans' Administration, and finally the Appraisers' Division of the Customs Service in 1937. It was then that Greenberg began to write seriously, and soon after began getting published in a handful of small magazines and literary journals.

== "Avant-Garde and Kitsch" ==
Though his first published essays dealt mainly with literature and theatre, art held a powerful attraction for Greenberg. His 1939 essay "Avant-Garde and Kitsch" for the Partisan Review established him as a visual art critic. In this Marxist-influenced essay, Greenberg wrote that true avant-garde art is a product of the Enlightenment's revolution of critical thinking, and as such resists and recoils from the degradation of culture in both mainstream capitalist and communist society. Kitsch, on the other hand, is the product of industrialization and the urbanization of the working class. A simplified form of culture for a populace hungry for it without the resources and education necessary to enjoy avant-garde culture. Greenberg writes:

Kitsch, using for raw material the debased and academicized simulacra of genuine culture, welcomes and cultivates this insensibility. It is the source of its profits. Kitsch is mechanical and operates by formulas. Kitsch is vicarious experience and faked sensations. Kitsch changes according to style, but remains always the same. Kitsch is the epitome of all that is spurious in the life of our times. Kitsch pretends to demand nothing of its customers except their money—not even their time.

Though to Greenberg Avant-Garde remained the true culture and Kitsch an empty shell of the culture it sought to imitate, he acknowledged that the artist was still paradoxically dependent on the market and state "by an umbilical cord of gold," with the majority of artists being unable to support themselves without it. In Greenberg's eyes, avant-garde art was too "innocent" to be effectively used as propaganda or bent to a cause, and kitsch ripe for manipulation and false sentiment.

Greenberg appropriated the German word "kitsch" to describe this low, concocted form of "culture", though its connotations have since been recast to a more affirmative acceptance of nostalgic materials of capitalist/communist culture.

== Art history, Abstract Expressionism and after ==
Greenberg wrote several seminal essays that defined his views on art history in the 20th century.

In 1940, Greenberg joined Partisan Review as an editor. He became art critic for The Nation in 1942. He was associate editor of Commentary from 1945 until 1957.

In December 1950, Greenberg joined the government funded American Committee for Cultural Freedom. He believed modernism provided a critical commentary on experience. It was constantly changing to adapt to kitsch pseudo-culture, which was itself always developing. In the years after World War II, Greenberg pushed the position that the best avant-garde artists were emerging in America rather than Europe. Particularly, he championed Jackson Pollock as the greatest painter of his generation, commemorating the artist's "all-over" gestural canvases. In the 1955 essay "American-Type Painting", Greenberg promoted the work of Abstract Expressionists, including Pollock, Willem de Kooning, Hans Hofmann, Barnett Newman, and Clyfford Still, as the next stage in Modernist art, arguing that these painters were moving toward greater emphasis on the "flatness" of the picture plane.

Greenberg helped articulate a concept of medium specificity. It posited that there are inherent qualities specific to each artistic medium, and part of the modernist project involved creating artworks that are more and more committed to their particular medium. In the case of painting, the two-dimensional reality of the medium led to an increasing emphasis on flatness, in contrast with the illusion of depth commonly found in painting since the Renaissance and the invention of pictorial perspective.

In Greenberg's view, after World War II the United States had become the guardian of "advanced art". He praised similar movements abroad and, after the success of the Painters Eleven exhibition in 1956 with the American Abstract Artists at New York's Riverside Gallery, he traveled to Toronto in 1957 to see the group's work. He was particularly impressed by the potential of painters William Ronald and Jack Bush, and later developed a close friendship with Bush. Greenberg saw Bush's post-Painters Eleven work as a clear manifestation of the shift from abstract expressionism to color field painting and lyrical abstraction, a shift he had called for in most of his critical writings of the period.

Greenberg expressed mixed feelings about pop art. On the one hand he maintained that pop art partook of a trend toward "openness and clarity as against the turgidities of second generation Abstract Expressionism." But Greenberg claimed that pop art did not "really challenge taste on more than a superficial level".

During the 1960s, Greenberg remained an influential figure on a younger generation of critics, including Michael Fried and Rosalind E. Krauss. His antagonism to "postmodernist" theories and socially engaged movements in art caused him to become a target for critics who labeled him, and the art he admired, "old-fashioned".

In 1968, Greenberg delivered the inaugural John Power Memorial Lecture at the Power Institute of Fine Arts at the University of Sydney, Australia.

In his book The Painted Word, Tom Wolfe criticized Greenberg along with Harold Rosenberg and Leo Steinberg, whom he dubbed the kings of "Cultureburg". Wolfe argued that these three critics were dominating the world of art with their theories and that, unlike the world of literature in which anyone can buy a book, the art world was controlled by an insular circle of rich collectors, museums and critics with outsized influence.

== Post-painterly abstraction ==
Eventually, Greenberg was concerned that some abstract expressionism had been "reduced to a set of mannerisms" and increasingly looked to a new set of artists who abandoned such elements as subject matter, connection with the artist, and definite brush strokes. He suggested this process attained a level of "purity" (a word he only used within scare quotes) that revealed the truthfulness of the canvas, and the two-dimensional aspects of the space (flatness). Greenberg coined the term post-painterly abstraction to distinguish it from abstract expressionism, or painterly abstraction, as he preferred to call it. Post-painterly abstraction was a term given to myriad abstract art that reacted against gestural abstraction of second-generation abstract expressionists. Among the dominant trends in post-painterly abstraction are hard-edged painters such as Ellsworth Kelly and Frank Stella, who explored relationships between tightly ruled shapes and edges—in Stella's case, between the shapes depicted on the surface and the literal shape of the support—and color-field painters such as Helen Frankenthaler and Morris Louis, who stained first Magna then water-based acrylic paints into unprimed canvas, exploring tactile and optical aspects of large, vivid fields of pure, open color. The line between these movements is tenuous, however, as artists such as Kenneth Noland used aspects of both movements in his art. Post-painterly abstraction is generally seen as continuing the modernist dialectic of self-criticism.

== Clement Greenberg Collection ==
In 2000, the Portland Art Museum (PAM) acquired the Clement Greenberg Collection of 159 paintings, prints, drawings, and sculpture by 59 important artists of the late-20th century and early-21st century. PAM exhibits the works primarily in the Jubitz Center for Modern and Contemporary Art; some sculpture resides outdoors. Most of the artists represented are American, along with several Canadians and a handful of artists of other nationalities. Artists represented in the collection include Edward Avedisian, Walter Darby Bannard, Stanley Boxer, Jack Bush, Anthony Caro, Dan Christensen, Ronald Davis, Richard Diebenkorn, Enrico Donati, Friedel Dzubas, André Fauteux, Paul Feeley, Helen Frankenthaler, Robert Goodnough, Adolph Gottlieb, Hans Hofmann, Wolfgang Hollegha, Robert Jacobsen, Paul Jenkins, Seymour Lipton, Georges Mathieu, Kenneth Noland, Jules Olitski, William Perehudoff, Jackson Pollock, Larry Poons, William Ronald, Anne Ryan, David Smith, Theodoros Stamos, Anne Truitt, Alfred Wallis, and Larry Zox.

Greenberg's widow, Janice van Horne, donated his annotated library of exhibition catalogues and publications on artists in Greenberg's collection to the Portland Art Museum. Greenberg's annotated library is available at the Portland Art Museum's Crumpacker Family Library which is open to the public free of charge.

== In popular culture ==
Greenberg was portrayed by actor Jeffrey Tambor in the 2000 film Pollock, about the life of Jackson Pollock.

== Bibliography ==
- Greenberg, Clement. Art and Culture, Beacon Press, 1961
- Greenberg, Clement. Late Writings, edited by Robert C. Morgan, St. Paul: University of Minnesota Press, 2003.
- Clement Greenberg: A Critic's Collection by Bruce Guenther, Karen Wilkin (Editor), Portland: Portland Art Museum, 2001. (ISBN 0-691-09049-1)
- Greenberg, Clement. Homemade Esthetics: Observations on Art and Taste. Oxford University Press, 1999.
- Jones, Caroline A. Eyesight Alone: Clement Greenberg's Modernism and the Bureaucratization of the Senses. University of Chicago Press, 2005.
- Kuspit, Donald. Clement Greenberg: Art Critic. University of Wisconsin, 1979.
- Marquis, Alice Goldfarb. Art Czar: The Rise and Fall of Clement Greenberg. Boston: MFA Publications, 2006.
- O'Brian, John. Clement Greenberg: The Collected Essays and Criticism. 4 vols. Chicago: University of Chicago Press, 1986 and 1993.
- Rubenfeld, Florence. Clement Greenberg: A Life. Scribner, 1997.
- Tekiner, Deniz (2006). "Formalist Art Criticism and the Politics of Meaning". Social Justice. 33 (2). Archived from the original on February 3, 2011 – via FindArticles.
- Anatoly Rykov. Clement Greenberg and American theory of contemporary art in the 1960s, in Art History, Journal of the Russian Institute of Art History. 2007, no. 1-2, pp. 538–563.
