= Michael Fried =

American art historian (born 1939)

Michael Martin Fried (born April 12, 1939 in New York City) is a modernist art critic and art historian. He studied at Princeton University and Harvard University and was a Rhodes Scholar at Merton College, Oxford. He is the J.R. Herbert Boone Professor Emeritus of Humanities and Art History at the Johns Hopkins University.

Fried's contribution to art history discourse involves debate over the development of modernism. This debate's interlocutors include Clement Greenberg, T. J. Clark, and Rosalind E. Krauss. From the early 1960s, he was also close to philosopher Stanley Cavell. Fried is also a published poet.

Fried was elected to the American Academy of Arts and Sciences in 1985 and the American Philosophical Society in 2003.

== Early career ==
Fried describes his early career in the introduction to Art and Objecthood: Essays and Reviews (1998), an anthology of his art criticism in the 1960s and 70s. He majored in English at Princeton, and it was there that he became interested in writing art criticism. While at Princeton, he met the artist Frank Stella and through him Walter Darby Bannard. In 1958, he wrote a letter to Clement Greenberg expressing his admiration for his writing and first met him in the spring of that year. In September 1958, he moved to the Oxford Ruskin School of Drawing and Fine Art, and then to London, England, in 1961–62, where he studied philosophy part-time at University College London (UCL), under Stuart Hampshire and Richard Wollheim. In 1961, Hilton Kramer offered him the post of London correspondent for the journal Arts. In the fall of 1961, Fried began his friendship with the sculptor Anthony Caro, who invited him to write the introduction to his Whitechapel Gallery exhibition in 1963.

In 1962 Fried had a short collection of eight poems (In Other Hands) published by Fantasy Press in Oxford. In the late summer of that year, he returned to the U.S., where he combined studying for a Ph.D in art history at Harvard with writing art criticism, initially for Art International. In 1965, he curated the exhibition "Three American painters: Kenneth Noland, Jules Olitski, Frank Stella" at Harvard's Fogg Art Museum.

== Theoretical contributions ==
In his essay "Art and Objecthood", published in 1967, Fried argues that minimalism's focus on the viewer's experience, rather than the relational properties of the work of art exemplified by modernism, makes the work of art indistinguishable from one's general experience of the world. Minimalism (or "literalism" as Fried called it) offers an experience of "theatricality" or "presence" rather than "presentness" (a condition that requires continual renewal). The essay opened the door to establishing a theoretical basis for minimalism as a movement based in a conflicting mode of phenomenological experience than the one offered by Fried.

In "Art and Objecthood" Fried criticized the "theatricality" of minimalist art. He introduced the opposing term "absorption" in his 1980 book, Absorption and Theatricality: Painting and Beholder in the Age of Diderot. Drawing on Diderot's criticism, Fried argues that whenever a self-consciousness of viewing exists, absorption is compromised, and theatricality results. As well as applying the distinction to 18th-century painting, Fried employs related categories in his art criticism of post-1945 American painting and sculpture. Fried rejects the effort by some critics to conflate his art-critical and art-historical writing. The book won the 1980 Gottschalk Prize.

In 1987 he released Realism, Writing, Disfiguration, focusing on the work of Thomas Eakins and Stephen Crane. The work won the 1990 Charles C. Eldredge Prize from the Smithsonian American Art Museum. In 1996 he released Manet's Modernism, which was later translated into French by Claire Brunet.

Fried revisited some of his ideas about theatricality and absorption in Why Photography Matters as Art as Never Before (2008). In a reading of works by prominent art photographers of the last 20 years (Bernd and Hilla Becher, Jeff Wall, Andreas Gursky, and Thomas Demand, among others) Fried asserts that concerns of anti-theatricality and absorption are central to the turn by contemporary photographers towards large-scale works "for the wall."

== Selected works ==
- Absorption and Theatricality: Painting and Beholder in the Age of Diderot. Berkeley: University of California Press, 1980.
- Realism, Writing, Disfiguration: On Thomas Eakins and Stephen Crane. University of Chicago Press, 1987.
- Courbet's Realism. University of Chicago Press, 1990.
- Manet's Modernism: or, The Face of Painting in the 1860s. University of Chicago Press, 1996.
- Art and Objecthood: Essays and Reviews. University of Chicago Press, 1998.
- Menzel's Realism: Art and Embodiment in Nineteenth-Century Berlin. Yale University Press, 2002.
- The Next Bend in the Road. University of Chicago Press, 2004.
- Why Photography Matters as Art as Never Before. Yale University Press, 2008.
- The Moment of Caravaggio. Princeton University Press, 2010.
- Four Honest Outlaws: Sala, Ray, Marioni, Gordon. Yale University Press, 2011.
- Flaubert's "Gueuloir": On Madame Bovary and Salammbô. Yale University Press, 2012.
- To the Center of the Earth. Macmillan Publishers, 2014.
- Another Light: Jacques-Louis David to Thomas Demand. Yale University Press, 2014.
- After Caravaggio. Yale University Press, 2016.
- Powers. David Zwirner Books, 2016. Poems
- Promesse du Bonheur. David Zwirner Books, 2016. Poems
- What Was Literary Impressionism?. Harvard University Press, 2018.
- Painting with DemonsThe Art of Gerolamo Savoldo. London: Reaktion Books, 2020.
- French Suite: A Book of Essays. Edited with Stephen Bann. London: Reaktion Books, 2022.
