= Jack Roth =

American painter (1927–2004)

Jack Roth (1927–2004), also known as Rodney Jack Roth, was an American painter associated with Abstract Expressionism and Color Field painting.

== Early life ==
He was born in Brockway, Pennsylvania. After studying with Mark Rothko, Clyfford Still and Richard Diebenkorn at the California School of Fine Arts (now the San Francisco Art Institute), he received a Master of Fine Arts from the University of Iowa in 1952, and a doctoral degree in mathematics from Duke University in 1962.

== Career ==
He taught math at Ramapo College in New Jersey, and also taught for brief periods at the University of South Florida and the University of Kentucky.

Roth's work includes several large abstract paintings created by staining raw, unprimed canvas with thinned paint, allowing the colors to soak directly into the weave of the canvas. He was represented by and exhibited at the Knoedler & Co. Gallery in New York City from 1979 to 1986 and was named New Talent Graphic artist of the year in 1963 by Art in America on the recommendation of MoMA curators Dorothy Miller and William S. Lieberman. In 1979 he was awarded a Guggenheim fellowship and in 1982 he received a New Jersey Council on the Arts Award.

He exhibited paintings in the Solomon R. Guggenheim Museum "Younger American Painters" (May 12 to July 25, 1954) – alongside Sonia Gechtoff, William Baziotes, Morris Louis, Richard Diebenkorn, Adolph Gottlieb, Philip Guston, Franz Kline, Willem de Kooning, Robert Motherwell, Jackson Pollock and others. This was one of the first major exhibitions of Abstract Expressionism at an American art museum, and it traveled to the Portland Museum of Art, the San Francisco Museum of Modern Art, the Henry Art Gallery at the University of Washington, University of Arkansas, Fayetteville, Los Angeles County Museum of Art and the New Orleans Museum of Art. He also exhibited at MoMA in 1963 and MoMA purchased several works by Roth for its permanent collections.

== Selected collections ==
- Art Museum of South Texas, Corpus Christi
- Duke University Art Museum
- Museum of Modern Art, New York
- National Gallery of Art, Washington, D.C.
- North Carolina Museum of Art
- University of Kentucky Art Museum
- Boise Art Museum

== Exhibitions ==
=== Group exhibitions ===
- Exhibition Momentum Midcontinental, Chicago, Illinois (1952)
- 5th Annual Iowa Artists Exhibition, Des Moines Art Center, Iowa (1953)
- Younger American Painters, Solomon R. Guggenheim Museum, New York (1954) (traveled to Portland Art Museum; San Francisco Museum of Fine Arts; Los Angeles County Museum; Isaac Delgado Museum, New Orleans, Henry Art Gallery at the University of Washington, University of Arkansas, Fayetteville)
- 15th Southeastern Annual, Atlanta, Georgia (1958)
- 1st Hunter Gallery Annual, Chattanooga, Tennessee (1958)
- Knoxville Art Center National Exhibition, Knoxville, Tennessee (1958)
- South Coast Art Show, Sarasota, Florida (1958) (traveled to High Museum, Atlanta; North Carolina Museum of Fine Arts, Raleigh; Mint Museum, Charlotte; Birmingham Museum, Alabama)
- New Acquisitions, Museum of Modern Art, New York (1963)
- Graphics 63, University of Kentucky, Lexington, Kentucky (1963) (circulated by the Smithsonian Institution)
- Group Show, Knoedler & Co., New York (1980)
- Summer Group Show, Knoedler & Co., New York (June 21 – September 23, 1982)
- Fall Show, Rosenberg Fine Arts, Ltd., Toronto, Canada (September 11 – October 16, 1982)
- Being and Becoming: First and Second Generation Abstract Expressionist Compositions, Peyton Wright, Santa Fe, New Mexico (2015)
- Mid-Century Abstraction: The American Vanguard, Sager | Braudis Gallery, Columbia, Missouri (2018)

=== One-man exhibitions ===
- 1949-50 Jack Roth, Contemporary Gallery, Sausalito, California
- 1963 Jack Roth, Grand Central Moderns, New York
- 1963 Jack Roth, Cinema I and II, New York
- 1965 Jack Roth, Kornman Gallery, Tampa, Florida
- 1967 Jack Roth, University of Florida, Jacksonville, Florida
- 1978 Jack Roth, Ramapo College Art Gallery, Mahwah, New Jersey
- 1980 Jack Roth: Recent Paintings, Knoedler & Co., New York
- 1980 Jack Roth: Ramapo Paintings, Clocktower, New York
- 1980 Gallery 99 Presents the Paintings of Jack Roth, Gallery 99, Bay Harbor Island, Florida
- 1981 Jack Roth, Knoedler & Co., New York
- 1982 Jack Roth: Drawings, Ramapo College Art Gallery, Mahwah, New Jersey
- 1982 Jack Roth, Rosenberg Fine Arts, Ltd., Toronto, Canada
- 1982 Jack Roth: Recent Paintings. Montclair Art Museum, Montclair, New Jersey
- 1982-83 Jack Roth: Drawings and Watercolors. Ramapo College Art Gallery, Mahwah, New Jersey (traveled to Hiram College, Hiram, Ohio; Sweet Briar College, Sweet Briar, Virginia; Junior College of Albany, Albany, New York; Montclair State University, Montclair, New Jersey; New Jersey State Museum, Trenton, New Jersey)
- 1983 Jack Roth, Millhouse-Bundy Museum, Vermont
- 1983 Jack Roth, Ochi Gallery, Boise, Idaho
- 1983 Jack Roth Paintings, Knoedler & Co., New York
- 1983 Jack Roth, Acrylics on Paper, New Jersey State Museum, Trenton
- 1985 Jack Roth Paintings, Princeton Gallery of Art, New Jersey
- 1985 Jack Roth, Wyckoff Gallery, New Jersey
- 1986 Jack Roth, Ramapo College Art Gallery, Mahwah, New Jersey
- 1997 Colonnades Gallery, Montclair, New Jersey
- 2011 When I grow up, I want to be just like Jasper Johns, Jack Roth Drawings

from the 1960s, McCormick Gallery, Chicago, Illinois

== See also ==
Another Jack Roth was a drummer with Jimmy Durante and appeared as a guest on The Jimmy Durante Show.

Yet another Jack Roth is an English actor, the son of Tim Roth.
