= Robert Rector (artist) =

American painter

- Born: Robert Tyrone Rector; November 16, 1946; Pascagoula, Mississippi
- Education: Louisiana State University
- Known for: Painting, printmaking, sculpture
- Movement: Abstract expressionism, color field painting, minimalism
- Spouse: Lois Behrnes Rector

Robert Rector (born 1946) is an American Postwar and contemporary painter.

His work can be found in collections in the United States, Japan, Europe and corporate collections, such as FedEx Field in Washington, DC and the U.S. embassy in Albania. His work has been shown at the Brooks Museum and other museums and galleries.

== Early life ==
Rector was born in Pascagoula, Mississippi and grew up in the neighboring town of Ocean Springs.

== Education ==
Rector graduated from Ocean Springs High School in 1964. He attended Louisiana State University in Baton Rouge, Louisiana, where he received his BFA in 1971 and his MFA in 1973.

He was an associate professor of art at Northwestern State University in Natchitoches, Louisiana. In 1981, Rector left teaching and began painting full-time. His work has been shown art galleries in the Southern region and museums in the U.S.

== Career ==
Rector creates abstract art that is influenced by color field painting, abstract expressionism,minimalism and the tension between the latter two. The Mississippi Encyclopedia states "His reconciliation of these approaches has produced complex abstractions concerned with the balance between intuition and intellect."

He has exhibited in solo and group exhibitions across the United States, including a recent retrospective at the Shaw Center for the Arts, Baton Rouge; the Ogden Museum of Art, New Orleans; The Hunter Museum of Art, Chattanooga; and Gremillion & Company, Houston and Austin.

His work has been described as an exploration of the "relationship between the natural environment and human experience" through the use of experimental, sculptural surface treatments. The compositions of his paintings reference architectural drawing. Rector works in the deep woods of Louisiana and makes trips to the beach and the Colorado Rockies. His paint-handling involves saturated, prismatic layers of paint that convey an atmospheric quality. Edward Pramuk called Rector "a visual poet." Others, including Patti Carr Black, have written that his paintings are "exquisite statements of color, surface, and gestural form" that is centered on landscape as form, color and light.

== Collections ==
His work is in numerous collections including Apple, Credit Suisse, Compaq, IBM, Louisiana State Collection, Old State Capitol Museum, Saks Fifth Avenue, Tokai Bank, and the University of Texas at Austin, among others.

His work is held in the permanent collection of the Memphis Brooks Museum of Art Ogden Museum of Southern Art, and the Louisiana State University Museum of Art and the Mississippi Museum of Art.
