= Vasa Mihich =

American painter

Untitled by Vasa Mihich, 1975, Honolulu Museum of Art

Vasa Velizar Mihich (born 1933, former Yugoslavia), known as Vasa, is an American artist based in Los Angeles, California and is a prominent figure in the Color Field movement.

Born in Yugoslavia, Vasa has lived in Los Angeles since his arrival in the United States in 1960. He is an academically trained painter and was a professor at the University of California, Los Angeles in the Department of Design and Media Arts. He taught theories of color to understand interdependence and interaction of color and form, color and quantity, color and placement, and after-image.

Now retired as a professor emeritus, Vasa focuses on his conceptual art practice. His studio, designed to accommodate the technology required for his work, is located in the heart of Los Angeles. He makes laminated acrylic sculptures that reflect and refract light. He has had solo exhibitions at galleries in the United States, Japan, Italy and Serbia, including the Museum of Contemporary Art, Belgrade, the San Diego Museum of Art, and the Palm Springs Desert Museum.

Vasa is best known for his sculptures made from colored pieces of acrylic. Untitled from 1975, in the collection of the Honolulu Museum of Art, demonstrates the effect of these minimalist sculptures. The Denver Art Museum, the Hammer Museum (Los Angeles), the Hirshhorn Museum and Sculpture Garden (Washington, D.C.), the Honolulu Museum of Art, The Phillips Collection (Washington, D.C.), the Royal Museums of Fine Arts of Belgium (Brussels), the San Diego Museum of Art, the San Francisco Museum of Modern Art, and the Wilhelm Lehmbruck Museum (Duisburg, Germany) are among the public collections holding work by Vasa Mihich.
