= Ward Jackson =

American artist (1928–2004)

Ward Jackson (September 10, 1928 in Petersburg, Virginia – February 3, 2004) was an American visual artist most closely associated with post painterly abstraction and minimalism, an archivist at the Solomon R. Guggenheim Museum, and the co-founder and editor of the publication "Art Now Gallery Guide".

In 1952 he received his bachelor's and MFA from the Richmond Professional Institute of the College of William and Mary. He then studied with the painter Hans Hofmann.

His opus is known for its diamond shaped works. His work is held in the permanent collections of the Smithsonian American Art Museum, the Whitney Museum of American Art, and MoMA, among others.
