= Post-painterly abstraction =

Term coined by art critic Clement Greenberg

Post-painterly abstraction is a term created by art critic Clement Greenberg as the title for an exhibit he curated for the Los Angeles County Museum of Art in 1964, which subsequently travelled to the Walker Art Center and the Art Gallery of Toronto.

== History ==
Greenberg had perceived that there was a new movement in painting that derived from the abstract expressionism of the 1940s and 1950s but "favored openness or clarity" as opposed to the dense painterly surfaces of that painting style. The 31 artists in the exhibition included Walter Darby Bannard, Jack Bush, Gene Davis, Thomas Downing, Friedel Dzubas, Paul Feeley, John Ferren, Sam Francis, Helen Frankenthaler, Al Held, Ellsworth Kelly, Nicholas Krushenick, Alexander Liberman, Kenneth Lochhead, Morris Louis, Arthur Fortescue McKay, Howard Mehring, Kenneth Noland, Jules Olitski, Ray Parker, David Simpson, Albert Stadler, Frank Stella, Mason Wells, Ward Jackson, Emerson Woelffer, and a number of other American and Canadian artists who were becoming well known in the 1960s.

Among the prior generation of contemporary artists, Barnett Newman has been singled out as one who anticipated "some of the characteristics of post-painterly abstraction."

As painting continued to move in different directions, initially away from abstract expressionism, the term "post-painterly abstraction", was used for works alongside minimalism, hard-edge painting, lyrical abstraction, and color field painting.

== See also ==
- Clement Greenberg
- Abstract expressionism
- Color field painting
- Lyrical abstraction
- Shaped canvas
- Washington Color School
