= Wolfgang Hollegha =

Austrian painter (1929–2023)

Wolfgang Hollegha (4 March 1929 – 2 December 2023) was an Austrian painter of the post-war generation. His œuvre and artistic approach is related to American Abstract Expressionism and this essential quality is characteristic of his work—one of the very few œuvres rooted in post-war European painting to which the concept of Abstract Expressionism fully applies. His work stems from a highly autonomous, even singular development within Austrian painting during the early 1950s.

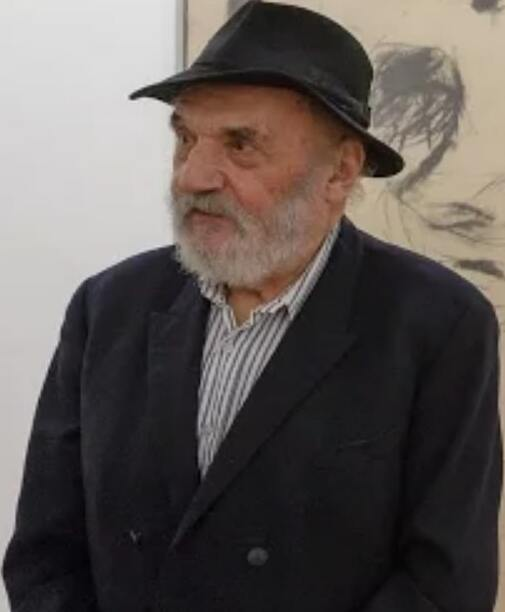
Hollegha in 2015

== Biography ==
Wolfgang Hollegha was born in Klagenfurt, Carinthia. From 1947 to 1954 he studied at the Akademie der bildenden Künste in Vienna with Josef Dobrovský and Herbert Boeckl. In 1956, together with Josef Mikl, Markus Prachensky and Arnulf Rainer, he formed the "Malergruppe St. Stephan" and following the lively exhibition activities of this artist group in Austria, Germany, France and Italy, Hollegha, as the first of his generation of Austrian artists, had successes in the USA. In 1958, Hollegha received the Guggenheim International Award for Austria. Of the prizewinners from 23 different nations in the same year, Hollegha was the youngest; among his co-winners were Mark Rothko (USA) and Alberto Giacometti (Switzerland). In 1960 he was invited by Clement Greenberg to participate in New York in a group exhibition of abstract painters. In 1961, Hollegha received the Carnegie Prize together with Jules Olitski, Adolph Gottlieb, Mark Tobey and Ellsworth Kelly, on the occasion of the Pittsburgh International exhibition. In 1964 he participated in the third Documenta in Kassel. From 1962 onwards, he lived and worked in Rechberg, Styria, where he built for himself a 14-metre-high studio. He became a professor at the Vienna Art Academy (Akademie der Bildenden Künste Wien) in 1972 and remained in this position until his retirement in 1997.

Hollegha died on 2 December 2023, at the age of 94.

== Work ==
Wolfgang Hollegha ranks among the most significant painters after 1945. His painting is always based on the perception of the concrete, on the relationship between the artist and visible reality. In his work the artistic process, in which the physical function plays an essential role, leads to large-scale paintings via the route of drawings; the external world is subjectively transformed into the visual world of the painter. His works can be found in many private collections as well as museums around the world (e.g. Albertina, Vienna; MUMOK (Museum Moderne Kunst Stiftung Ludwig, Vienna); Portland Art Museum, Oregon; Carnegie Museum of Art, Pittsburgh).
