= Color field =

Art movement

Kenneth Noland, Beginning, 1958, magna on canvas painting, Hirshhorn Museum and Sculpture Garden. Working in Washington, D.C., Noland was a pioneer of the color field movement in the late 1950s.

Color field painting (Colour field painting in Commonwealth English) is a style of abstract painting that emerged in New York City during the 1940s and 1950s. It was inspired by European modernism and closely related to abstract expressionism, while many of its notable early proponents were among the pioneering abstract expressionists. Color field is characterized primarily by large fields of flat, solid color spread across or stained into the canvas creating areas of unbroken surface and a flat picture plane. The movement places less emphasis on gesture, brushstrokes and action in favor of an overall consistency of form and process. In color field painting "color is freed from objective context and becomes the subject in itself."

During the late 1950s and 1960s, color field painters emerged in parts of the United Kingdom, Canada, Australia, and the United States, particularly New York, Washington, D.C., and elsewhere, using formats of stripes, targets, simple geometric patterns and references to landscape imagery and to nature.

== Historical roots ==
Henri Matisse, Porte-fenêtre à Collioure (French Window at Collioure), 1914, Centre Georges Pompidou, "Throughout my life, the 20th-century painter whom I've admired the most has been Matisse", Robert Motherwell 1970.

The focus of attention in the world of contemporary art began to shift from Paris to New York after World War II and the development of American abstract expressionism. During the late 1940s and early 1950s Clement Greenberg was the first art critic to suggest and identify a dichotomy between differing tendencies within the abstract expressionist canon. Taking issue with Harold Rosenberg (another important champion of abstract expressionism), who wrote of the virtues of action painting in his article "American Action Painters" published in the December 1952 issue of ARTnews, Greenberg observed another tendency toward all-over color or color field in the works of several of the so-called "first generation" abstract expressionists.

Mark Rothko was one of the painters that Greenberg referred to as a color field painter exemplified by Magenta, Black, Green on Orange, although Rothko himself refused to adhere to any label. For Rothko, color was "merely an instrument". In a sense, his best known works – the "multiforms" and his other signature paintings – are, in essence, the same expression, albeit one of purer (or less concrete or definable, depending on the interpretation) means, which is that of the same "basic human emotions", as his earlier surrealistic mythological paintings. What is common among these stylistic innovations is a concern for "tragedy, ecstasy and doom". By 1958, whatever spiritual expression Rothko meant to portray on canvas, it was growing increasingly darker. His bright reds, yellows and oranges of the early 1950s subtly transformed into dark blues, greens, grays and blacks. His final series of paintings from the mid-1960s were gray, and black with white borders, seemingly abstract landscapes of an endless bleak, tundra-like, unknown country.

Rothko, during the mid-1940s, was in the middle of a crucial period of transition, and he had been impressed by Clyfford Still's abstract fields of color, which were influenced in part by the landscapes of Still's native North Dakota. In 1947, during a subsequent semester teaching at the California School of Fine Art (known today as the San Francisco Art Institute), Rothko and Still flirted with the idea of founding their own curriculum or school. Still was considered one of the foremost color field painters – his non-figurative paintings are largely concerned with the juxtaposition of different colors and surfaces. His jagged flashes of color give the impression that one layer of color has been "torn" off the painting, revealing the colors underneath, reminiscent of stalactites and primordial caverns. Still's arrangements are irregular, jagged, and pitted with heavy texture and sharp surface contrast as seen above in 1957D1.

Another artist whose best known works relate to both abstract expressionism and to color field painting is Robert Motherwell. Motherwell's style of abstract expressionism, characterized by loose opened fields of painterly surfaces accompanied by loosely drawn and measured lines and shapes, was influenced by both Joan Miró and by Henri Matisse. Motherwell's Elegy to the Spanish Republic No. 110 (1971) is a pioneering work of both abstract expressionism and color field painting. While the Elegy series embodies both tendencies, his Open Series of the late 1960s, 1970s and 1980s places him firmly within the color field camp. In 1970 Motherwell said, "Throughout my life, the 20th-century painter whom I've admired the most has been Matisse", alluding to several of his own series of paintings that reflect Matisse's influence, most notably his Open Series that come closest to classic color field painting.

Barnett Newman is considered one of the major figures in abstract expressionism and one of the foremost of the color field painters. Newman's mature work is characterized by areas of color pure and flat separated by thin vertical lines, or "zips" as Newman called them, exemplified by Vir Heroicus Sublimis in the collection of MoMA. Newman himself thought that he reached his fully mature style with the Onement series (from 1948) seen here. The zips define the spatial structure of the painting while simultaneously dividing and uniting the composition. Although Newman's paintings appear to be purely abstract, and many of them were originally untitled, the names he later gave them hinted at specific subjects being addressed, often with a Jewish theme. Two paintings from the early 1950s, for example, are called Adam and Eve (see Adam and Eve), and there are also Uriel (1954) and Abraham (1949), a very dark painting, which, in addition to being the name of a biblical patriarch, was also the name of Newman's father, who had died in 1947. Newman's late works, such as the Who's Afraid of Red, Yellow and Blue series, use vibrant, pure colors, often on very large canvases.

Jackson Pollock, Adolph Gottlieb, Hans Hofmann, Barnett Newman, Clyfford Still, Mark Rothko, Robert Motherwell, Ad Reinhardt and Arshile Gorky (in his last works) were among the prominent abstract expressionist painters that Greenberg identified as being connected to color field painting in the 1950s and 1960s.

Although Pollock is closely associated with action painting because of his style, technique, and his painterly 'touch' and his physical application of paint, art critics have likened Pollock to both action painting and color field painting. Another critical view advanced by Clement Greenberg connects Pollock's allover canvases to the large-scale Water Lilies of Claude Monet done during the 1920s. Greenberg, art critic Michael Fried, and others have observed that the overall feeling in Pollock's most famous works – his drip paintings – read as vast fields of built-up linear elements often reading as vast complexes of similar valued paint skeins that read as all over fields of color and drawing, and are related to the mural-sized late Monets that are constructed of many passages of close valued brushed and scumbled marks that also read as close valued fields of color and drawing that Monet used in building his picture surfaces. Pollock's use of all-over composition lend a philosophical and a physical connection to the way the color field painters like Newman, Rothko and Still construct their unbroken and in Still's case broken surfaces. In several paintings that Pollock painted after his classic drip painting period of 1947–1950, he used the technique of staining fluid oil paint and house paint into raw canvas. During 1951 he produced a series of semi-figurative black stain paintings, and in 1952 he produced stain paintings using color. In his November 1952 exhibition at the Sidney Janis Gallery in New York City Pollock showed Number 12, 1952, a large, masterful stain painting that resembles a brightly colored stained landscape (with an overlay of broadly dripped dark paint); the painting was acquired from the exhibition by Nelson Rockefeller for his personal collection. In 1960 the painting was severely damaged by fire in the Governors Mansion in Albany that also severely damaged an Arshile Gorky painting and several other works in the Rockefeller collection. However, by 1999 it had been restored and was installed in Empire State Plaza.

While Arshile Gorky is considered to be one of the founding fathers of abstract expressionism and a surrealist, he was also one of the first painters of the New York School who used the technique of "staining". Gorky created broad fields of vivid, open, unbroken color that he used in his many of his paintings as grounds. In Gorky's most effective and accomplished paintings between the years 1941 and 1948, he consistently used intense stained fields of color, often letting the paint run and drip, under and around his familiar lexicon of organic and biomorphic shapes and delicate lines. Another abstract expressionist whose works in the 1940s call to mind the stain paintings of the 1960s and the 1970s is James Brooks. Brooks frequently used stain as a technique in his paintings from the late 1940s. Brooks began diluting his oil paint in order to have fluid colors with which to pour and drip and stain into the mostly raw canvas that he used. These works often combined calligraphy and abstract shapes. During the final three decades of his career, Sam Francis' style of large-scale bright abstract expressionism was closely associated with color field painting. His paintings straddled both camps within the abstract expressionist rubric, action painting and color field painting.

Having seen Pollock's 1951 paintings of thinned black oil paint stained into raw canvas, Helen Frankenthaler began to produce stain paintings in varied oil colors on raw canvas in 1952. Her most famous painting from that period is Mountains and Sea (as seen below). She is one of the originators of the color field movement that emerged in the late 1950s. Frankenthaler also studied with Hans Hofmann. Hofmann's paintings are a symphony of color as seen in The Gate, 1959–1960. Hofmann was renowned not only as an artist but also as a teacher of art, both in his native Germany and later in the U.S. Hofmann, who came to the United States from Germany in the early 1930s, brought with him the legacy of Modernism. Hofmann was a young artist working in Paris who painted there before World War I. Hofmann worked in Paris with Robert Delaunay, and he knew firsthand the innovative work of both Pablo Picasso and Henri Matisse. Matisse's work had an enormous influence on him, and on his understanding of the expressive language of color and the potentiality of abstraction. Hofmann was one of the first theorists of color field painting, and his theories were influential to artists and to critics, particularly to Clement Greenberg, as well as to others during the 1930s and 1940s. In 1953 Morris Louis and Kenneth Noland were both profoundly influenced by Frankenthaler's stain paintings after visiting her studio in New York City. Returning to Washington, DC., they began to produce the major works that created the color field movement in the late 1950s.

In 1972 then Metropolitan Museum of Art curator Henry Geldzahler said:

Clement Greenberg included the work of both Morris Louis and Kenneth Noland in a show that he did at the Kootz Gallery in the early 1950s. Clem was the first to see their potential. He invited them up to New York in 1953, I think it was, to Helen's studio to see a painting that she had just done called Mountains and Sea, a very, very beautiful painting, which was in a sense, out of Pollock and out of Gorky. It also was one of the first stain pictures, one of the first large field pictures in which the stain technique was used, perhaps the first one. Louis and Noland saw the picture unrolled on the floor of her studio and went back to Washington, DC., and worked together for a while, working at the implications of this kind of painting.

Morris Louis's painting Where 1960, was a major innovation that moved abstract expressionist painting forward in a new direction toward color field and minimalism. Among Louis's major works are his various series of color field paintings. Some of his best known series are the Unfurleds, the Veils, the Florals and the Stripes or Pillars. From 1929 to 1933, Louis studied at the Maryland Institute of Fine and Applied Arts (now Maryland Institute College of Art). He worked at various odd jobs to support himself while painting and in 1935 was president of the Baltimore Artists' Association. From 1936 to 1940, he lived in New York and worked in the easel division of the Works Progress Administration Federal Art Project. During this period, he knew Arshile Gorky, David Alfaro Siqueiros, and Jack Tworkov, returning to Baltimore in 1940. In 1948, he started to use Magna – oil-based acrylic paints. In 1952, Louis moved to Washington, D.C., living there somewhat apart from the New York scene and working almost in isolation. He and a group of artists that included Kenneth Noland were central to the development of color field painting. The basic point about Louis's work and that of other color field painters, sometimes known as the Washington Color School in contrast to most of the other new approaches of the late 1950s and early 1960s, is that they greatly simplified the idea of what constitutes the look of a finished painting.

Noland, working in Washington, D.C., was also a pioneer of the color field movement in the late 1950s who used series as important formats for his paintings. Some of Noland's major series were called Targets, Chevrons and Stripes. Noland attended the experimental Black Mountain College and studied art in his home state of North Carolina. Noland studied with professor Ilya Bolotowsky who introduced him to neo-plasticism and the work of Piet Mondrian. There he also studied Bauhaus theory and color with Josef Albers and he became interested in Paul Klee, specifically his sensitivity to color. In 1948 and 1949 he worked with Ossip Zadkine in Paris, and in the early 1950s met Morris Louis in Washington, DC.

In 1970 art critic Clement Greenberg said:

I'd place Pollock along with Hofmann and Morris Louis in this country among the very greatest painters of this generation. I actually don't think there was anyone in the same generation in Europe quite to match them. Pollock didn't like Hofmann's paintings. He couldn't make them out. He didn't take the trouble to. And Hofmann didn't like Pollock's allover paintings, nor could most of Pollock's artist friends make head or tail out of them, the things he did from 1947 to '50. But Pollock's paintings live or die in the same context as Rembrandt's or Titian's or Velázquez's or Goya's or David's or ... or Manet's or Ruben's or Michelangelo's paintings. There's no interruption, there's no mutation here. Pollock asked to be tested by the same eye that could see how good Raphael was when he was good or Piero when he was good.

== Color field movement ==
By the late 1950s and early 1960s young artists began to break away stylistically from abstract expressionism; experimenting with new ways of making pictures; and new ways of handling paint and color. In the early 1960s, several and various new movements in abstract painting were closely related to each other, and superficially were categorized together; although they turned out to be profoundly different in the long run. Some of the new styles and movements that appeared in the early 1960s as responses to abstract expressionism were called: Washington Color School, hard-edge painting, geometric abstraction, minimalism, and color field.

Gene Davis also was a painter known especially for paintings of vertical stripes of color, like Black Grey Beat (1964) and he also was a member of the group of abstract painters in Washington, D.C. during the 1960s known as the Washington Color School. The Washington painters were among the most prominent of the mid-century color field painters.

Jack Bush, Big A, 1968. Bush was a Canadian artist closely tied to color field painting and lyrical abstraction which grew out of abstract expressionism.

The artists associated with the color field movement during the 1960s were moving away from gesture and angst in favor of clear surfaces and gestalt. During the early to mid-1960s, color field painting was the term for the work of artists like Anne Truitt, John McLaughlin, Sam Francis, Sam Gilliam, Thomas Downing, Ellsworth Kelly, Paul Feeley, Friedel Dzubas, Jack Bush, Howard Mehring, Gene Davis, Mary Pinchot Meyer, Jules Olitski, Kenneth Noland, Helen Frankenthaler, Robert Goodnough, Ray Parker, Al Held, Emerson Woelffer, David Simpson, Vasa Velizar Mihich and others whose works were formerly related to second generation abstract expressionism; and also to younger artists like Larry Poons, Ronald Davis, Larry Zox, John Hoyland, Walter Darby Bannard and Frank Stella. All were moving in a new direction away from the violence and anxiety of action painting toward a new and seemingly calmer language of color.

Although color field is associated with Clement Greenberg, Greenberg actually preferred to use the term "post-painterly abstraction." In 1964, Clement Greenberg curated an influential exhibition that traveled the country called Post-Painterly Abstraction. The exhibition expanded the definition of color field painting. Color field painting clearly pointed toward a new direction in American painting, away from abstract expressionism. In 2007, Karen Wilkin curated an exhibition called Color As Field: American Painting 1950–1975 that traveled to several museums throughout the United States. The exhibition showcased several artists representing two generations of color field painters.

In 1970 painter Jules Olitski said:

I don't know what Color Field painting means. I think it was probably invented by some critic, which is okay, but I don't think the phrase means anything. Color Field painting? I mean, what is color? Painting has to do with a lot of things. Color is among the things it has to do with. It has to do with surface. It has to do with shape, It has to do with feelings which are more difficult to get at.

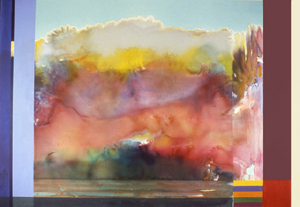
Ronnie Landfield, Rite of Spring, 1985. Landfield's work emerged during the 1960s. His works are reflections of both Chinese landscape painting and the color field idiom. His paintings bridge color field painting with lyrical abstraction.

Jack Bush was a Canadian abstract expressionist painter, born in Toronto, Ontario in 1909. He was a member of Painters Eleven, the group founded by William Ronald in 1954 to promote abstract painting in Canada, and was soon encouraged in his art by the American art critic Clement Greenberg. With encouragement from Greenberg, Bush became closely tied to two movements that grew out of the efforts of the abstract expressionists: color field painting and lyrical abstraction. His painting Big A is an example of his color field paintings of the late 1960s.

During the late 1950s and early 1960s, Frank Stella was a significant figure in the emergence of minimalism, post-painterly abstraction and color field painting. His shaped canvases of the 1960s like Harran II (1967) revolutionized abstract painting. One of the most important characteristics of Stella's paintings is his use of repetition. His black pinstripe paintings of 1959 shocked an art world that was unused to seeing monochromatic and repetitive images, painted flat, with almost no inflection. During the early 1960s, Stella made several series of notched Aluminum Paintings and shaped Copper Paintings before making multicolored and asymmetrical shaped canvases of the late 1960s. Frank Stella's approach and relationship to color field painting was not permanent or central to his creative output; as his work became more and more three-dimensional after 1980.

In the late 1960s, Richard Diebenkorn began his Ocean Park series, created during the final 25 years of his career. They are important examples of color field painting. The Ocean Park series, exemplified by Ocean Park No.129, connects his earlier abstract expressionist works with color field painting. During the early 1950s, Richard Diebenkorn was known as an abstract expressionist, and his gestural abstractions were close to the New York School in sensibility but firmly based in the San Francisco abstract expressionist sensibility; a place where Clyfford Still has a considerable influence on younger artists by virtue of his teaching at the San Francisco Art Institute.

By the mid-1950s, Richard Diebenkorn along with David Park, Elmer Bischoff and several others formed the Bay Area Figurative School with a return to Figurative painting. Between the fall of 1964 and the spring of 1965, Diebenkorn traveled throughout Europe; he was granted a cultural visa to visit and view Henri Matisse paintings in important Soviet museums. These works were rarely seen by people outside of the Soviet Union. When he returned to painting in the Bay Area in mid-1965, his resulting works summed up all that he had learned from his more than a decade as a leading figurative painter. When he returned to abstraction in 1967, his works were parallel to movements like the color field movement and lyrical abstraction, but he remained independent of both.

During the late 1960s, Larry Poons, whose earlier Dot paintings were associated with Op Art, began to produce looser and more free formed paintings that were referred to as his Lozenge Ellipse paintings of 1967–1968. Along with John Hoyland, Walter Darby Bannard, Larry Zox, Ronald Davis, Ronnie Landfield, John Seery, Pat Lipsky, Dan Christensen and several other young painters a new movement that related to color field painting began to form. It was eventually known as lyrical abstraction. The late 1960s saw painters turning to surface inflection, deep space depiction, painterly touch and paint handling merging with the language of color. Among a new generation of abstract painters who emerged combining color field painting with expressionism, the older generation also began infusing new elements of complex space and surface into their works. By the 1970s Poons created thick-skinned, cracked and heavy paintings referred to as Elephant Skin paintings; Christensen sprayed loops, colored webs of lines and calligraphy across multicolored fields of delicate grounds; Ronnie Landfield's stained band paintings are reflections of both Chinese landscape painting and the color field idiom, and John Seery produced his stained paintings, as exemplified by East, 1973, from the National Gallery of Australia. Poons, Christensen, Davis, Landfield, Seery, Lipsky, Zox and several others created paintings that bridge color field painting with lyrical abstraction and underscore a re-emphasis on landscape, gesture and touch.

== Overview ==
Color field painting is related to post-painterly abstraction, suprematism, abstract expressionism, hard-edge painting and lyrical abstraction. It initially referred to a particular type of abstract expressionism, especially the work of Mark Rothko, Clyfford Still, Barnett Newman, Robert Motherwell, Adolph Gottlieb and several series of paintings by Joan Miró. Art critic Clement Greenberg perceived color field painting as related to but different from action painting.

An important distinction that made color field painting different from abstract expression was the paint handling. The most basic fundamental defining technique of painting is application of paint and the color field painters revolutionized the way paint could be effectively applied.

Color field painting sought to rid art of superfluous rhetoric. Artists like Barnett Newman, Mark Rothko, Clyfford Still, Adolph Gottlieb, Morris Louis, Jules Olitski, Kenneth Noland, Friedel Dzubas, and Frank Stella, and others often used greatly reduced formats, with drawing essentially simplified to repetitive and regulated systems, basic references to nature, and a highly articulated and psychological use of color. In general these artists eliminated overt recognizable imagery in favor of abstraction. Certain artists quoted references to past or present art, but in general color field painting presents abstraction as an end in itself. In pursuing this direction of modern art, these artists wanted to present each painting as one unified, cohesive, monolithic image often within series' of related types.

In distinction to the emotional energy and gestural surface marks and paint handling of abstract expressionists such as Jackson Pollock and Willem de Kooning, color field painting initially appeared to be cool and austere. Color field painters efface the individual mark in favor of large, flat, stained and soaked areas of color, considered to be the essential nature of visual abstraction along with the actual shape of the canvas, which Frank Stella in particular achieved in unusual ways with combinations of curved and straight edges. However, color field painting has proven to be both sensual and deeply expressive albeit in a different way from gestural abstract expressionism. Denying connection to abstract expressionism or any other Art Movement Mark Rothko spoke clearly about his paintings in 1956:

I am not an abstractionist ... I am not interested in the relationship of color or form or anything else. ... I'm interested only in expressing basic human emotions — tragedy, ecstasy, doom and so on — and the fact that a lot of people break down and cry when confronted with my pictures show that I communicate those basic human emotions. ... The people who weep before my pictures are having the same religious experience I had when I painted them. And if you, as you say, are moved only by their color relationships, then you miss the point!

=== Stain painting ===
Joan Miró was one of the first and most successful stain painters. Although staining in oil was considered dangerous to cotton canvas in the long run, Miró's example during the 1920s, 1930s and 1940s was an inspiration and an influence on the younger generation. One of the reasons for the success of the color field movement was the technique of staining. Artists would mix and dilute their paint in buckets or coffee cans making a fluid liquid and then they would pour it into raw unprimed canvas, generally cotton duck. The paint could also be brushed on or rolled on or thrown on or poured on or sprayed on, and would spread into the fabric of the canvas. Generally artists would draw shapes and areas as they stained. Many different artists employed staining as the technique of choice to use in making their paintings. James Brooks, Jackson Pollock, Helen Frankenthaler, Morris Louis, Paul Jenkins, and dozens of other painters found that pouring and staining opened the door to innovations and revolutionary methods of drawing and expressing meaning in new ways. The number of artists who stained in the 1960s greatly increased with the availability of acrylic paint. Staining acrylic paint into the fabric of cotton duck canvas was more benign and less damaging to the fabric of the canvas than the use of oil paint. In 1970 artist Helen Frankenthaler commented about her use of staining:

When I first started doing the stain paintings, I left large areas of canvas unpainted, I think, because the canvas itself acted as forcefully and as positively as paint or line or color. In other words, the very ground was part of the medium, so that instead of thinking of it as background or negative space or an empty spot, that area did not need paint because it had paint next to it. The thing was to decide where to leave it and where to fill it and where to say this doesn't need another line or another pail of colors. It's saying it in space.

=== Spray painting ===
Few artists used the spray gun technique to create large expanses and fields of color sprayed across their canvases during the 1960s and 1970s. Some painters who effectively used spray painting techniques include Jules Olitski, who was a pioneer in his spray technique that covered his large paintings with layer after layer of different colors, often gradually changing hue and value in subtle progression. Another important innovation was Dan Christensen's use of a spray technique to great effect in loops and ribbons of bright color; sprayed in clear, calligraphic marks across his large-scale paintings. William Pettet, Richard Saba, and Albert Stadler, used the technique to create large-scale fields of multi-colors; while Kenneth Showell sprayed over crumpled canvases and created an illusion of abstract still-life interiors. Most of the spray painters were active especially during the late 1960s and 1970s.

=== Stripes ===
Stripes were one of the most popular vehicles for color used by several different color field painters in a variety of different formats. Barnett Newman, Morris Louis, Jack Bush, Gene Davis, Kenneth Noland and David Simpson, all made important Series' of stripe paintings. Although he did not call them stripes but zips Barnett Newman's stripes were mostly vertical, of varying widths and sparingly used. In Simpson and Noland's case their stripe paintings were all mostly horizontal, while Gene Davis painted vertical stripe paintings and Morris Louis mostly painted vertical stripe paintings sometimes called Pillars. Jack Bush tended to do both horizontal and vertical stripe paintings as well as angular ones.

=== Magna paint ===
Magna, a special artist use acrylic paint was developed by Leonard Bocour and Sam Golden in 1947 and reformulated in 1960, specifically for Morris Louis and other stain painters of the color field movement. In Magna pigments are ground in an acrylic resin with alcohol-based solvents. Unlike modern water-based acrylics, Magna is miscible with turpentine or mineral spirits and dries rapidly to a matte or glossy finish. It was used extensively by Morris Louis, and Friedel Dzubas and also by Pop artist Roy Lichtenstein. Magna colors are more vivid and intense than regular acrylic water-based paints. Louis used Magna to great effect in his Stripe Series, where the colors are used undiluted and are poured unmixed directly from the can.

=== Acrylic paint ===
In 1972, former Metropolitan Museum of Art curator Henry Geldzahler said:

Color field, curiously enough or perhaps not, became a viable way of painting at exactly the time that acrylic paint, the new plastic paint, came into being. It was as if the new paint demanded a new possibility in painting, and the painters arrived at it. Oil paint, which has a medium that is quite different, which isn't water-based, always leaves a slick of oil, or puddle of oil, around the edge of the color. Acrylic paint stops at its own edge. Color field painting came in at the same time as the invention of this new paint.

Acrylics were first made commercially available in the 1950s as mineral spirit-based paints called Magna offered by Leonard Bocour. Water-based acrylic paints were subsequently sold as "latex" house paints, although acrylic dispersion uses no latex derived from a rubber tree. Interior "latex" house paints tend to be a combination of binder (sometimes acrylic, vinyl, pva and others), filler, pigment and water. Exterior "latex" house paints may also be a "co-polymer" blend, but the very best exterior water-based paints are 100% acrylic.

Soon after the water-based acrylic binders were introduced as house paints, both artists – the first of whom were Mexican muralists – and companies began to explore the potential of the new binders. Acrylic artist paints can be thinned with water and used as washes in the manner of watercolor paints, although the washes are fast and permanent once dry. Water-soluble artist-quality acrylic paints became commercially available in the early 1960s, offered by Liquitex and Bocour under the trade name of Aquatec. Water-soluble Liquitex and Aquatec proved to be ideally suited for stain painting. The staining technique with water-soluble acrylics made diluted colors sink and hold fast into raw canvas. Painters such as Kenneth Noland, Helen Frankenthaler, Dan Christensen, Sam Francis, Larry Zox, Ronnie Landfield, Larry Poons, Sherron Francis, Jules Olitski, Gene Davis, Ronald Davis, Georg Karl Pfahler, Sam Gilliam and others successfully used water-based acrylics for their new stain, color field paintings.

=== Legacy: influences and influenced ===
Richard Diebenkorn, Ocean Park No.129, 1984. The Ocean Park series connects his earlier abstract expressionist works with Color field painting. The influence of both Henri Matisse and Joan Miró is particularly strong in this painting.

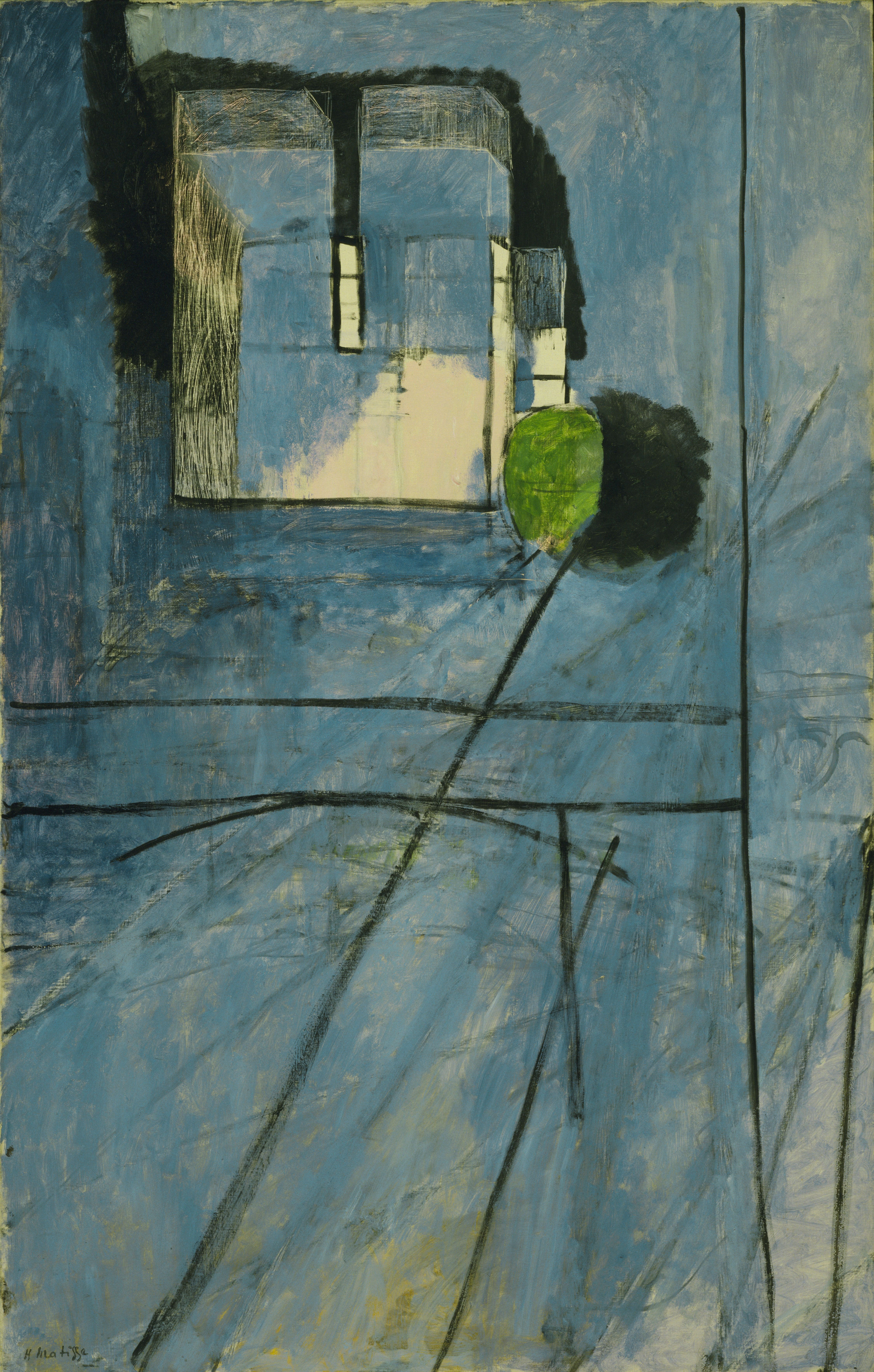
Henri Matisse, View of Notre-Dame, 1914, Museum of Modern Art. The Matisse paintings French Window at Collioure and View of Notre Dame both from 1914 exerted tremendous influence on American color field painters in general (including Robert Motherwell's Open Series) and on Richard Diebenkorn's Ocean Park paintings specifically.

The painterly legacy of 20th-century painting is a long and intertwined mainstream of influences and complex interrelationships. The use of large opened fields of expressive color applied in generous painterly portions, accompanied by loose drawing (vague linear spots and/or figurative outline) can first be seen in the early 20th-century works of both Henri Matisse and Joan Miró. Matisse and Miró, as well as Pablo Picasso, Paul Klee, Wassily Kandinsky, and Piet Mondrian directly influenced the abstract expressionists, the color field painters of post-painterly abstraction and the lyrical abstractionists. Late 19th-century Americans like Augustus Vincent Tack and Albert Pinkham Ryder, along with early American Modernists like Georgia O'Keeffe, Marsden Hartley, Stuart Davis, Arthur Dove, and Milton Avery's landscapes also provided important precedents and were influences on the abstract expressionists, the color field painters, and the lyrical abstractionists. Matisse paintings French Window at Collioure, and View of Notre-Dame both from 1914 exerted tremendous influence on American color field painters in general, (including Robert Motherwell's Open Series), and on Richard Diebenkorn's Ocean Park paintings specifically. According to art historian Jane Livingston, Diebenkorn saw both Matisse paintings in an exhibition in Los Angeles in 1966, and they had an enormous impact on him and his work. Jane Livingston says about the January 1966 Matisse exhibition that Diebenkorn saw in Los Angeles:

It is difficult not to ascribe enormous weight to this experience for the direction his work took from that time on. Two pictures he saw there reverberate in almost every Ocean Park canvas. View of Notre Dame and French Window at Collioure, both painted in 1914, were on view for the first time in the US.

Livingston goes on to say "Diebenkorn must have experienced French Window at Collioure, as an epiphany."

Miró was one of the most influential artists of the 20th century. He pioneered the technique of staining; creating blurry, multi-colored cloudy backgrounds in thinned oil paint throughout the 1920s and 1930s; on top of which he added his calligraphy, characters and abundant lexicon of words, and imagery. Arshile Gorky openly admired Miró's work and painted Miró-like paintings, before finally discovering his own originality in the early 1940s. During the 1960s Miró painted large (abstract expressionist scale) radiant fields of vigorously brushed paint in blue, in white, and other monochromatic fields of colors; with blurry black orbs and calligraphic stone-like shapes, floating at random. These works resembled the color field paintings of the younger generation. Biographer Jacques Dupin said this about Miró's work of the early 1960s:

These canvases disclose affinities – Miró does not in the least attempt to deny this – with the researches of a new generation of painters. Many of these, Jackson Pollock for one, have acknowledged their debt to Miró. Miró in turn displays lively interest in their work and never misses an opportunity to encourage and support them. Nor does he consider it beneath his dignity to use their discoveries on some occasions.

Taking its example from other European modernists like Miró, the color field movement encompasses several decades from the mid 20th century through the early 21st century. Color field painting actually encompasses three separate but related generations of painters. Commonly used terms to refer to the three separate but related groups are abstract expressionism, post-painterly abstraction, and lyrical abstraction. Some of the artists made works in all three eras, that relate to all of the three styles. Color field pioneers such as Jackson Pollock, Mark Rothko, Clyfford Still, Barnett Newman, John Ferren, Adolph Gottlieb, and Robert Motherwell are primarily thought of as abstract expressionists. Artists like Helen Frankenthaler, Sam Francis, Richard Diebenkorn, Jules Olitski, and Kenneth Noland were of a slightly younger generation, or in the case of Morris Louis aesthetically aligned with that generation's point of view; that started out as abstract expressionists but quickly moved to post-painterly abstraction. While younger artists like Frank Stella, Ronald Davis, Larry Zox, Larry Poons, Walter Darby Bannard, Ronnie Landfield, Dan Christensen, began with post-painterly abstraction and eventually moved forward towards a new type of expressionism, referred to as lyrical abstraction. Many of the artists mentioned, as well as many others, have practiced all three modes at one phase of their careers or another. During the later phases of color field painting; as reflections of the zeitgeist of the late 1960s (in which everything began to hang loose) and the angst of the age (with all of the uncertainties of the time) merged with the gestalt of post-painterly abstraction, producing lyrical abstraction which combined precision of the color field idiom with the malerische of the abstract expressionists. During the same period of the late 1960s, and early 1970s in Europe, Gerhard Richter, Anselm Kiefer and several other painters also began producing works of intense expression, merging abstraction with images, incorporating landscape imagery, and figuration that by the late 1970s was referred to as neo-expressionism.

== Painters ==
The following is a list of color field painters, closely related artists and some of their more important influences:

- Josef Albers (1888–1976)
- Edward Avedisian (1936–2007)
- Walter Darby Bannard (1934–2016)
- Arvid Boecker (born 1964)
- Ilya Bolotowsky (1907–1981)
- Frank Bowling (born 1934)
- Stanley Boxer (1926–2000)
- Jack Bush (1909–1977)
- Dan Christensen (1942–2007)
- Gene Davis (1920–1985)
- Ronald Davis (born 1937)
- Robyn Denny (1930–2014)
- Richard Diebenkorn (1922–1993)
- Piero Dorazio (1927–2005)
- Thomas Downing (1928–1985)
- Friedel Dzubas (1915–1994)
- Gabriele Evertz (born 1945)
- Wojciech Fangor (1922–2015)
- Paul Feeley (1910–1966)
- John Ferren (1905-1970)
- Sam Francis (1923–1994)
- Sherron Francis (born 1940)
- Helen Frankenthaler (1928–2011)
- Sam Gilliam (1933-2022)
- Joe Goode (1937-2025)
- Robert Goodnough (1917–2010)
- Cleve Gray (1918–2004)
- John Griefen (1942–2025)
- Al Held (1928–2005)
- Howard Hodgkin (1932–2017)
- Hans Hofmann (1880–1966)
- Wolfgang Hollegha (1929-2023)
- Ralph Hotere (1931–2013)
- John Hoyland (1934–2011)
- Paul Jenkins (1923–2012)
- Wolf Kahn (1927-2020)
- Jacob Kainen (1909–2001)
- Minoru Kawabata (1911–2001)
- Ellsworth Kelly (1923–2015)
- Paul Klee (1879–1940)
- Ronnie Landfield (born 1947)
- Pat Lipsky (born 1941)
- Morris Louis (1912–1962)
- Brice Marden (1938-2023)
- Emily Mason (1932-2019)
- Henri Matisse (1869–1954)
- John McLaughlin (1898–1976)
- Howard Mehring (1931–1978)
- Mary Pinchot Meyer (1920–1964)
- Joan Miró (1893–1983)
- Piet Mondrian (1872–1944)
- Robert Motherwell (1915–1991)
- Robert Natkin (1930–2010)
- Barnett Newman (1905–1970)
- Kenneth Noland (1924–2010)
- Jules Olitski (1922–2007)
- Blinky Palermo (1943–1977)
- J. S. Parker (1944–2017)
- Ray Parker (1922–1990)
- William Perehudoff (1918–2013)
- Georg Karl Pfahler (1926-2002)
- William Pettet (1942–2019)
- John Plumb (1927–2008)
- Larry Poons (born 1937)
- Robert Rector (born 1946)
- Paul Reed (1919–2015)
- Peter Reginato (born 1945)
- Ad Reinhardt (1913–1967)
- Jack Roth (1927–2004)
- Mark Rothko (1903–1970)
- Kikuo Saito (1939–2016)
- Ludwig Sander (1906-1975)
- John Seery (born 1941)
- David Simpson (born 1928)
- Richard Smith (1931–2016)
- David G. Sorensen (1937–2011)
- Frederick Spratt (1927–2008)
- Nicolas de Staël (1914–1955)
- Clyfford Still (1904–1980)
- Frank Stella (1936–2024)
- Alma Woodsey Thomas (1891–1978)
- Anne Truitt (1921–2004)
- John Walker (born 1939)
- Neil Williams (1934–1988)
- Peter Young (born 1940)
- Larry Zox (1937–2006)

== See also ==
- Abstract art
- Abstract Imagists
- Concrete art
- Hard-edge painting
- Lyrical abstraction
- Modern art
- Post-painterly abstraction
- Warming stripes (data visualization technique using the color field concept)
- Washington Color School
- Western painting

== Sources ==
- Greenberg, Clement. Art and Culture, Beacon Press, 1961
- Greenberg, Clement. Late Writings, edited by Robert C. Morgan, St. Paul: University of Minnesota Press, 2003.
- Greenberg, Clement. Homemade Esthetics: Observations on Art and Taste. Oxford University Press, 1999.
- Kleiner, Fred S.; and Mamiya, Christin J., Gardner's Art Through the Ages (2004). Volume II. Wadsworth Publishing. ISBN 0-534-64091-5.
- Schwabsky, Barry (1994). "Irreplaceable Hue – Color Field Painting". Artforum. 33 (1). Archived from the original on January 24, 2007 – via FindArticles.
- Color As Field: American Painting, 1950–1975, retrieved December 7, 2008
- Wilkin, Karen and Belz, Carl. Color As Field: American Painting, 1950–1975. Published: Yale University Press; 1 edition (November 29, 2007). ISBN 0-300-12023-0, ISBN 978-0-300-12023-3
- Livingston, Jane. The Art of Richard Diebenkorn, with essays by John Elderfield, Ruth E. Fine, and Jane Livingston. The Whitney Museum of American Art, 1997, ISBN 0-520-21257-6
- De Antonio, Emile and Tuchman, Mitchell. Painters Painting A Candid History of The Modern Art Scene, 1940–1970, Abbeville Press 1984, ISBN 0-89659-418-1
- Jacques Dupin, Joan Miró Life and Work, Harry N. Abrams, Inc., Publisher, New York City, 1962, Library of Congress Catalog Card Number: 62-19132
- Various authors: Barbara Rose, Gerald Nordland, Walter Hopps, Hardy S. George; Breaking the Mold, Selections from the Washington Gallery of Modern Art, 1961–1968, exhibition catalogue, Oklahoma City Museum of Art 2007, ISBN 0-911919-05-8
- Cynthia Goodman. Hans Hofmann, with essays by Irving Sandler, and Clement Greenberg; Exhibition Catalog, Whitney Museum of American Art, New York in association with Prestel-Verlag, Munich, ISBN 0-87427-070-7
- Irving Sandler. The New York School: The Painters and Sculptors of the Fifties, Harper & Row, 1978 ISBN 0-06-438505-1
- Aldrich, Larry. Young Lyrical Painters, Art in America, v.57, n6, November–December 1969, pp. 104–113.
- Peter Schjeldahl. New Abstract Painting: A Variety of Feelings, Exhibition review, "Continuing Abstraction", The Whitney Downtown Branch, 55 Water St. NYC. The New York Times, October 13, 1974.
- Kertess, Klaus. Peter Young Paintings 1963–1980. Parc Foundation. ISBN 978-1-931885-68-3
- Kertess, Klaus. The Nature of Paint, Ronnie Landfield:Forty Years of Color Abstraction, Exhibition Catalog, ISBN 978-0-9820841-2-0
- Carmean, E.A. Toward Color and Field, Exhibition Catalogue, Houston Museum of Fine Arts, 1971.
- Carmean, E.A. Helen Frankenthaler A Paintings Retrospective, Exhibition Catalog, Harry N. Abrams in conjunction with The Museum of Modern Art, Fort Worth, ISBN 0-8109-1179-5
- Henning, Edward B. Color & Field, Art International May 1971: 46–50.
- Tucker, Marcia. The Structure of Color, New York: Whitney Museum of American Art, NYC, 1971.
- Robbins, Daniel. Larry Poons: Creation of the Complex Surface, Exhibition Catalogue, Salander/O'Reilly Galleries, pp. 9–19, 1990.
- Michael Fried. Morris Louis, Harry N. Abrams, Library of Congress Number: 79-82872
