= Friedel Dzubas =

German-American painter

- Born: April 20, 1915; Berlin, Germany
- Died: December 10, 1994 (aged 79); Auburndale, Massachusetts
- Known for: Abstract painting
- Movement: Color Field painting, Lyrical Abstraction
- Awards: Guggenheim Fellowship 1966, 1968

Friedel Dzubas (April 20, 1915 in Berlin, Germany – December 10, 1994 in Auburndale, Massachusetts) was a German-born American abstract painter.

== Life and work ==
Friedel Dzubas studied art in his native land before fleeing Nazi Germany in 1939 and settling in New York City. In Manhattan during the early 1950s, he shared a studio with fellow abstract painter Helen Frankenthaler. He began exhibiting his Abstract expressionist paintings at this time.

His work was included in the Ninth Street Show in New York City in 1951, and in group exhibitions at the Leo Castelli gallery, the Stable Gallery, and the Tibor de Nagy Gallery, among others. After the Ninth Street Show annual invitational exhibitions were held at the Stable Gallery throughout the 1950s. The poster of the second New York Painting and Sculpture Annual at The Stable Gallery in 1953, included an introduction by Clement Greenberg:

In the 1960s he became associated with Color field painting and Lyrical Abstraction. He was included in Post-painterly abstraction a 1964 exhibition curated by Clement Greenberg. Dzubas was a friend of Clement Greenberg, who in turn introduced him to Jackson Pollock and other artists.

His large work (up to 24 feet (7.3 m) wide) became more fluid. During the last three decades of his career, Dzubas had more than sixty solo exhibitions around the world. He was represented by the André Emmerich gallery and Knoedler Contemporary Arts in New York for more than thirty years. His works were exhibited at galleries including the Anita Shapolsky Gallery and the Jacobson Howard Gallery in New York City. In 1976 he settled in Massachusetts, but also painted and lived in New York City, where his paintings were regularly exhibited.

== Technique ==
Dzubas used Magna paint, an acrylic paint favored by many of the artist's peers over oil paint, from 1966 onward. The artist would apply thick layers of color over washes, scrubbing the paint into the unprimed canvas. Dzubas used staining, brushing and other ways of applying color. His paintings were generally large in size and scale, but he made many very small paintings as well.

== Teaching ==
He was a teacher and lecturer at:

- 1962 Dartmouth College, Hanover, New Hampshire;
- 1965–66, Institute of Humanistic Studies, Aspen (now Aspen Institute);
- 1968–69, University of Pennsylvania, Philadelphia;
- 1969–1970s, Cornell University, Ithaca, New York;

he had the longest relationship with the School of the Museum of Fine Arts, Boston, where he taught from 1976 to 1983.

== Selected Museum collections ==
- Whitney Museum of American Art, New York
- Guggenheim Museum, New York
- San Francisco Museum of Modern Art, California
- Everson Museum of Art, Syracuse, New York
- Yale University Art Gallery, New Haven, Connecticut
- Smithsonian American Art Museum, Washington, D.C.
- Lowe Art Museum, Coral Gables, Florida
- Georgia Museum of Art, Athens, Georgia
- Rose Art Museum of Brandeis University, Waltham, Massachusetts
- Kemper Museum of Contemporary Art, Kansas City, Missouri
- Newark Museum, Newark, New Jersey
- Princeton University Art Museum, Princeton, New Jersey
- Albright-Knox Art Gallery, Buffalo, New York
- Herbert F. Johnson Museum of Art, Ithaca, New York
- Parrish Art Museum, Southampton, New York
- Portland Art Museum, Portland, Oregon
- Museum of Fine Arts, Houston, Texas
- Boston Museum of Fine Arts, Massachusetts
- Metropolitan Museum of Art, New York
- Boca Raton Museum of Art, Boca Raton, Florida
- Speed Art Museum, Louisville, KY
- Castellani Art Museum, Lewiston, New York

== Awards ==
- 1966 Guggenheim Fellowship,
- 1968 Guggenheim Fellowship
- 1968 National Council on the Arts Award

== See also ==
- Color field painting
- Lyrical Abstraction
- New York School
- Abstract expressionism
