= Walter Darby Bannard =

American abstract painter and professor (1934–2016)

- Born: September 23, 1934; New Haven, Connecticut, U.S.
- Died: October 2, 2016 (aged 82); Miami, Florida, U.S.
- Education: Phillips Exeter Academy; Princeton University
- Known for: Abstract painting
- Movement: Modernism, Lyrical Abstraction, Minimalism, Formalism (art), Post-painterly Abstraction

Walter Darby Bannard (September 23, 1934 – October 2, 2016) was an American abstract painter and professor of art and art history at the University of Miami.

== Biography ==
Bannard was born in New Haven, Connecticut and attended Phillips Exeter Academy, where he graduated in 1952. He attended Princeton University, where he befriended Frank Stella and Michael Fried, who were also interested in minimalist abstraction.

Clement Greenberg included Bannard in the exhibition Post-Painterly Abstraction at the Los Angeles County Museum of Art in 1964.

Bannard was awarded a Guggenheim Fellowship in 1968. He also served as co-chair of the International Exhibitions Committee of the National Endowment for the Arts.

From 1989 to 1992, Bannard chaired the Department of Art and Art History at the University of Miami in Coral Gables, Florida, where he taught painting until his death in 2016.

== Work ==
=== Art ===
Bannard was associated with modernism, lyrical abstraction, minimalism, formalism, abstraction and color field painting. His art has been exhibited in nearly a hundred solo exhibitions and several hundred group exhibitions.

Bannard's paintings from 1959 to 1965 contained few forms, as little as a single band painted around a field of color, and then developed into somewhat more complex geometric forms by the mid-1960s. The critic Phyllis Tuchman wrote about a 2015 exhibition of these works at Berry Campbell Gallery, "These colors are still radiant. And the artist’s pale palette is as uniquely personal today as it was fifty years ago. You can’t even apply a name to his hues."

In the late 1960s the forms dissolved into pale, atmospheric fields of color applied with rollers and paint-soaked rags. He began using the new acrylic mediums in 1970 and his paintings evolved into colorful expanses of richly colored gels and polymers applied with squeegees and commercial floor brooms.

=== Writings ===
Bannard wrote over a hundred reviews and essays which appeared in Artforum, Art in America, and many other publications. He curated and wrote the catalog for the first comprehensive retrospective exhibition of the paintings of Hans Hofmann at the Hirshhorn Museum in Washington, D.C. Aphorisms for Artists: 100 Ways Toward Better Art, a collection of his thoughts edited by Franklin Einspruch, was published in 2022.

== Selected museum collections ==
- Buffalo AKG Art Museum
- Museum of Fine Arts, Boston
- Museum of Modern Art
- Philadelphia Museum of Art
- Portland Art Museum
- Whitney Museum of American Art

== Bibliography ==
- Krauss, R., "Darby Bannard's New Work," Artforum, vol. 4, April 1966, pp. 32-
- Bourdon, D., "Darby Bannard: The Possibilities of Color," Art International, vol.11, May 1967, pp. 37 – 39
- "New Look for Old Tradition," Time Magazine, vol. 93, February 7, 1969, pp. 60 – 63
- Mashek, J., "London Commentary: Bannard at Kasmin," Studio International, vol. 178, November 1969, p. 175
- ..... "Canvases Brimming with Color," Life Magazine, September 24, 1971, pp. 74 – 79
- Elderfield, J., "Walter Darby Bannard at Kasmin Gallery," Studio International, vol. 184, #949, November 1972, pp. 184 – 186
- Mashek, P., "His Latest Work," Artforum, Vol. XI, #8, p. 66, March 1973
- Cone, J. H., catalog essay and interview, "Walter Darby Bannard," Retrospective exhibit, Baltimore Museum of Art, Baltimore, Maryland
- Carmean, Jr., E. A., "Modernist Art 1960 to 1970," Catalog essay for exhibit "The Great Decade of American Painting," Museum of Fine Arts, Houston, Texas. Also published in Studio Magazine, July/August 1974, Vol. 188, #968
- Walsh, J., "Walter Darby Bannard's New Pictures," Arts, September 1982, pp. 77 – 79, incl. three color reproductions: Riffle, 1982; Cloud Comb, 1981; Tarquin, 1981
- Fenton, T., "Walter Darby Bannard," Catalog for the exhibition at the Edmonton Art Gallery, September 2 - October 30, 1983, organized and written by Terry Fenton (incl. numerous reproductions & photos)
- Fox, M., "Walter Darby Bannard," in catalog of show Definitive Statements - American Art: 1964 - 1966, List Art Center, Brown University, March 1–30, 1986, (ill: Seasons #2, 1965, b&w)
- Wilkin, K., "Walter Darby Bannard" Contemporary Artists, Third Edition 1989, St. James Press, London, (Ill: The Flurry, 1982)
- Koenig, R., "Walter Darby Bannard: Recent Works, 1987 - 1990," catalog essay for the exhibition at the Montclair Art Museum, Montclair, NJ, February 17 March 31, 1991 (ill. in color: Osa Montana #2, 1987; Formosa, 1988; The Indians, 1990)
- Humblet, C., "La Nouvelle Abstraction Americaine", a major three-volume survey of American abstract painting published by Skira of Milan, includes a full chapter on Bannard's work, 33 reproductions in color of paintings and a black & white portrait of the artist. (Volume III, Section 13, Pgs. 1480-1513) It was published initially in French and was published by Skira in English as "The New American Abstraction 1950-1970" in 2007
- Link, J., "Darby Bannard’s Scallop Series: Minimalism Mastered" catalog essay for the exhibition "Darby Bannard: The Scallop Series", Western Michigan University, Kalamazoo, Michigan, Feb. 1-20, 2006
- Rose, Barbara et al, "Painting After Postmodernism | Belgium - USA", exhibition catalog published by Lannoo, Tielt (Belgium), 2016, P. 7, pp. 9–20, pp. 21–32.
