= Larry Poons =

American abstract painter (born 1937)

- Larry Poons, Untitled, ca.1964
- Born: October 1, 1937 (age 89); Tokyo, Japan
- Education: School of the Museum of Fine Arts, Boston. Art Students League of New York.
- Known for: Abstract art
- Notable work: Brown Sound, Night on Cold Mountain, Day on Cold Mountain
- Spouse: Paula DeLuccia

Lawrence M. "Larry" Poons (born October 1, 1937) is an American abstract painter. Poons was born in Tokyo; he studied from 1955 to 1957 at the New England Conservatory of Music in Boston, with the intent of becoming a professional musician. After seeing Barnett Newman's exhibition at French and Company in 1959, he gave up musical composition and enrolled at the School of the Museum of Fine Arts, Boston. He also studied at the Art Students League of New York in Manhattan, New York. Poons taught at The Art Students League from 1966 to 1970 and again teaches at the League (since 1997).

== Career ==
Associated with Op Art, Hard-edge painting, Color Field painting, Lyrical Abstraction, and Abstract Expressionism, Poons has challenged critical expectations throughout his career, transitioning through several distinct phases of work. According to New York Times critic Roberta Smith, "Since emerging in the 1960s, Mr. Poons has shown a strong preference for allover fields of pulsing color, even if his means of achieving them have varied enormously." Poons first rose to prominence in the 1960s with paintings of circles and ovals on solid—often brilliantly colored—backgrounds. The works, often referred to as the Dot paintings conveyed a sense of movement, and were categorized as op art. Along with artists including Donald Judd, Claes Oldenburg, and Lucas Samaras, Poons was represented by the Green Gallery in the early 1960s. In the later part of the 1960s, he showed with Leo Castelli. Although he exhibited with optical artists in 1965, by 1966 he had moved away from the optical art towards looser and more painterly abstract canvases. Though many people criticized Poons's move away from the dot paintings, Frank Stella championed his progress, leaving a congratulatory note for the artist at his gallery.

Poons' painting, Brown Sound was featured on the cover of the Summer issue of Artforum in 1968. Poons was included in Emile de Antonio's 1972 documentary Painters Painting: The New York Art Scene 1940-1970 and he was the subject of Hollis Frampton's 1966 film, Manual of Arms. Poons is also included in Andy Warhol's 1967 Portrait of the Artists, which includes Jasper Johns, Donald Judd, Roy Lichtenstein, Lee Bontecou, Frank Stella, Robert Rauschenberg, Robert Morris, and James Rosenquist—all of whom had collaborated on a series of prints through Leo Castelli. A documentary on Poons's work, titled Larry Poons: On Making Art: ART/New York No. 51, was made in 1999 by videographer Paul Tschinkel. Poons is also a feature figure, along with Jeff Koons, Gerhard Richter, and Njideka Akunyili Crosby in Nathaniel Kahn's 2018 documentary on the business of selling art, The Price of Everything.

== Other endeavors ==
Although Poons gave up musical composition, he played guitar with The Druds, a short-lived avant-garde noise music art band which featured prominent members of the New York proto-conceptual art and minimal art community in the early 1960s. Walter de Maria played the drums, LaMonte Young played the saxophone, and Patty Mucha (Oldenburg) was the lead singer. Andy Warhol and Jasper Johns wrote the lyrics for the band's songs. As a vintage motorcycle racer who divides his time between painting and motorcycle racing, Poons has been given special awards from the American Historic Racing Motorcycle Association (AHRMA) including the 500 cc Hailwood Cup in 1998 and 2003, and the 2003 John & Ginny Demoisey Trophy for road racing couples with his wife, painter Paula DeLuccia. He races a Matchless G50 and a Ducati 250.

Poons primarily lives in New York City and maintains a studio in upstate New York.

== Collections ==
Poons has works in dozens of collections throughout the world including the Albright-Knox Art Gallery in Buffalo, New York, the Art Institute of Chicago, the Cleveland Museum of Art in Cleveland, Ohio, the Hirshhorn Museum and Sculpture Garden in Washington, D.C., the Metropolitan Museum of Art in Manhattan, the Museum of Contemporary Art, Los Angeles, the Museum of Fine Arts, Boston, the Museum of Fine Arts, Houston, the Museum of Modern Art in Manhattan, the Philadelphia Museum of Art, the Santa Barbara Museum of Art in Santa Barbara, California, the Smithsonian American Art Museum in Washington, D.C., the Tate in London, the Van Abbemuseum in Eindhoven, Netherlands, the Whitney Museum of American Art in Manhattan, and the Yale University Art Gallery in New Haven, Connecticut.
