= Kenneth Noland =

American abstract painter (1924–2010)

- Noland in 1971
- Born: April 10, 1924; Asheville, North Carolina, U.S.
- Died: January 5, 2010 (aged 85); Port Clyde, Maine, U.S.
- Education: Black Mountain College
- Known for: Abstract art
- Movement: color field painting
- Spouses: Cornelia Langer (m. 1950; div. 1957) Stephanie Gordon (m. 1967; div. 1970) Peggy L. Schiffer (m. 1970, divorced) Paige Rense (m. 1994)
- Children: 4, including Cady
- Website: Official site

Kenneth Noland (April 10, 1924 – January 5, 2010) was an American painter. He was one of the best-known American color field painters, although in the 1950s he was thought of as an abstract expressionist and in the early 1960s as a minimalist painter. Noland helped establish the Washington Color School movement. In 1977, he was honored with a major retrospective at the Solomon R. Guggenheim Museum in New York that then traveled to the Hirshhorn Museum and Sculpture Garden in Washington, D.C., and Ohio's Toledo Museum of Art in 1978. In 2006, Noland's Stripe Paintings were exhibited at the Tate in London.

== Early life and education ==
A son of Harry Caswell Noland (1896–1975), a pathologist, and his wife, Bessie (1897–1980), Kenneth Clifton Noland was born in Asheville, North Carolina. He had four siblings: David, Bill, Neil, and Harry Jr.

Noland enlisted in the U.S. Air Force in 1942 after completing high school. As a veteran of World War II, he took advantage of the G.I. Bill to study art at Black Mountain College in his home state of North Carolina. At Black Mountain, where two of his brothers also studied art, Noland studied with Ilya Bolotowsky, a professor who introduced him to neoplasticism and the work of Piet Mondrian. Noland also studied Bauhaus theory and color there under Josef Albers and became interested in Paul Klee—specifically Klee's sensitivity to color.

== Career ==
Beginning (1958) at the Hirshhorn Museum and Sculpture Garden

In 1948 and 1949 Noland worked with Ossip Zadkine in Paris, and had his first exhibition of his paintings there in 1949. After returning to the U.S., he taught in Washington, D.C., at Catholic University (1951–1960) and the Institute of Contemporary Arts.

In the early 1950s, Noland met Morris Louis in D.C. while teaching night classes at the Washington Workshop Center for the Arts. He became friends with Louis, and after being introduced by Clement Greenberg to Helen Frankenthaler and seeing her new paintings at her studio in New York City in 1953, he and Louis adopted her "soak-stain" technique of allowing thinned paint to soak into unprimed canvases.

Most of Noland's paintings fall into one of four groups: circles (or targets), chevrons, stripes, and shaped canvases. His preoccupation with the relationship of the image to the containing edge of the picture led him to a series of studies of concentric rings or bullseyes, commonly called targets, which, like the one reproduced here—Beginning (1958)—used unlikely color combinations. This also led Noland away from Louis in 1958.

In 1964, he was included in the exhibition Post-Painterly Abstraction curated by Clement Greenberg, which traveled the country and helped to firmly establish color field painting as an important new movement in contemporary art of the 1960s. Noland pioneered the shaped canvas, initially with a series of symmetrical and asymmetrical diamonds or chevrons. In these paintings, the edges of the canvas become as structurally important as the center.

During the 1970s and 1980s his shaped canvases were highly irregular and asymmetrical. These resulted in increasingly complex structures of highly sophisticated and controlled color and surface integrity.

== Technique ==
Instead of painting the canvas with a brush, Noland's style was to stain the canvas with color. This idea sought to remove the artist through brushstrokes. This made the piece about the art, not the artist. He emphasized spatial relationships in his work by leaving unstained, bare canvas as a contrast against the colors used throughout his paintings. Noland used simplified abstraction so the design would not detract from the use of color.

Noland's students included the sculptor Jennie Lea Knight and painter Alice Mavrogordato.

== Personal life ==
Noland was married to:

- Cornelia Langer, a daughter of the U.S. senator from North Dakota William Langer. They married in 1950 and divorced in 1957. They had three children: daughters Cady and Lyndon (a.k.a. Lyn) and a son, William.
- Stephanie Gordon, a psychologist, lived with Noland from November 1964 until June 1970. They married in April 1967 and divorced in June 1970.
- Peggy L. Schiffer, an art historian. They married circa 1970, and had a son, Samuel Jesse.
- Paige Rense, editor in chief of Architectural Digest, whom he married in Bennington, Vermont, on April 10, 1994. Noland was her fourth husband; her previous spouses included Arthur F. Rense.

Noland had an affair in the 1960s with artist and socialite Mary Pinchot Meyer.

== Death ==
Noland died of kidney cancer at his home in Port Clyde, Maine, on January 5, 2010, at the age of 85.

== Exhibitions ==
Noland had his first solo exhibition at Galerie Raymond Creuze in Paris in 1948. In 1957, he had his first New York solo exhibition at the Tibor de Nagy Gallery. In 1964, Noland occupied half the American pavilion at the Venice Biennale. In 1965, his work was exhibited at the Washington Gallery of Modern Art and the Jewish Museum (New York). Noland's final solo exhibition, Kenneth Noland Shaped Paintings 1981–82, opened on October 29, 2009, at the Leslie Feely Fine Art Gallery on East 68th Street in New York City and was scheduled to close on January 9, 2010 (though the closing date was later extended to January 16). In 2010, Noland was honored with a solo presentation of his work at the Guggenheim Museum, entitled Kenneth Noland, 1924–2010: A Tribute. In addition, his work has been the subject of solo exhibitions at a range of international institutions, including the Museo de Arte Moderno, Mexico City (1983); Museo de Bellas Artes de Bilbao, Bilbao, Spain (1985); Museum of Fine Arts, Houston (2004); Tate, Liverpool (2006); and Butler Institute of American Art, Youngstown, Ohio (1986 and 2007).

== Influence ==
In 1984, US menswear designer Alexander Julian incorporated Noland's designs and coloring in his knitwear.

== Selected museum collections ==
- Albright-Knox Art Gallery, Buffalo, New York
- Art Gallery of South Australia, Adelaide, Australia
- Art Institute of Chicago, Chicago, Illinois
- Australian National Gallery, Canberra, Australia
- Baltimore Museum of Art, Baltimore, Maryland
- Boston Museum of Fine Arts, Boston, Massachusetts
- Butler Institute of American Art, Youngstown, Ohio
- Centre Pompidou, Paris, France
- Cleveland Museum of Art, Cleveland, Ohio
- Columbus Gallery of Fine Arts, Columbus, Ohio
- Corcoran Gallery of Art, Washington, D.C.
- Des Moines Art Center, Des Moines, Iowa
- Detroit Institute of Arts, Detroit, Michigan
- Governor Nelson A. Rockefeller Empire State Plaza Art Collection, Albany, New York
- Fogg Art Museum, Cambridge, Massachusetts
- Hirshhorn Museum and Sculpture Garden, Washington, D.C.
- Kunsthaus Zürich, Zürich, Switzerland
- Kunstmuseum Basel, Basel, Switzerland
- Kunstsammlung Nordrhein-Westfalen, Düsseldorf, Germany
- Los Angeles County Museum of Art, California
- Louisiana Museum, Humlebaek, Denmark
- Metropolitan Museum of Art, New York
- Milwaukee Art Museum, Milwaukee, Wisconsin
- Minneapolis Institute of Arts, Minneapolis, Minnesota
- Museum of Modern Art, New York
- National Gallery of Art, Washington, D.C.
- North Carolina Museum of Art, Raleigh, North Carolina
- Norton Simon Museum, Pasadena, California
- Pérez Art Museum Miami, Miami, Florida
- Phillips Collection, Washington, D.C.
- Rose Art Museum, Brandeis University, Waltham, Massachusetts
- Solomon R. Guggenheim Museum, New York
- St. Louis Art Museum, St. Louis, Missouri
- Stedelijk Museum, Amsterdam, Netherlands
- Tate, London, England
- Wadsworth Atheneum, Hartford, Connecticut
- Walker Art Center, Minneapolis, Minnesota
- Whitney Museum of American Art, New York

== Selected works ==
- (1958) Ex-Nihilio
- (1958) Lunar Episode
- (1958) Beginning
- (1958) Inside
- (1958) Heat
- (1959) And Half
- (1959) Split
- (1959) Extent
- (1960) Bloom
- (1960) Back and Front
- (1960) Earthen Bound
- (1960) Play
- (1961) Highlights
- (1961) Epigram
- (1961) Turnsole
- (1963) Ringing Bell
- (1963) Drifting
- (1963) Thrust
- (1963) East-West
- (1963) New Light
- (1963) Cadmium Radiance
- (1964) Baba Yagga
- (1964) Halfway
- (1964) And Again
- (1964) Swing
- (1964) Tropical Zone
- (1964) Trans West
- (1965) Stack
- (1966) Galore
- (1966) Sound
- (1967) Summer Plain
- (1967) Stria
- (1967) Open End
- (1968) Transvaries
- (1969) Pan
- (1973) Interlocking Color
- (1973) Under Color
- (1975) Burnt Beige
- (1978) Oasis
- (1978) Tune
- (1985) Snow and Ice
- (1989) Doors: Time Ahead
- (1999) Refresh
- (2000) Mysteries: Infanta
- (2000) Mysteries: Afloat
