= Jules Olitski =

American artist (1922–2007)

- Born: Jevel Demikovski; March 27, 1922; Snovsk, Ukrainian SSR
- Died: February 4, 2007 (aged 84)
- Citizenship: United States
- Known for: Painting, sculpture, printmaking
- Movement: Color Field painting, Lyrical Abstraction, abstract expressionism

Jevel Demikovski (March 27, 1922 – February 4, 2007), known professionally as Jules Olitski, was an American painter, printmaker, and sculptor.

== Early life ==
Olitski was born Jevel Demikovsky in Snovsk, in the Ukrainian Soviet Socialist Republic (now Chernihiv Oblast, Ukraine), a few months after his father, a commissar, was executed by the Soviet government. He emigrated to the United States in 1923 with his mother and grandmother and settled in Brooklyn. His grandmother cared for him while his mother worked to support the family. In 1926 his mother married Hyman Olitsky, a widower with two sons. She and Olitsky had a daughter in 1930.

== Education ==
Olitski showed an aptitude for drawing and by 1935 was taking occasional art classes in Manhattan. He attended public schools in New York, winning an art prize upon his graduation from high school. At an exhibit of the work of some of the great masters at the New York World's Fair in 1939 he was impressed by Rembrandt's portraits. Subsequently he won a scholarship to study art at Pratt Institute and was admitted to the National Academy of Design in New York. His education continued at Beaux Arts Institute in New York from 1940–42.

After being discharged from the Army in 1945, Olitski married Gladys Katz and then stayed with Leo and Alma Gershenson in Asheville, North Carolina. After some time, on Leo's advice, he traveled to Mexico. He later returned to New York, and then in the late 1940s went to Paris on the G.I. Bill, studying at the Ossip Zadkine School and the Académie de la Grande Chaumière. In Paris he saw the European modern masters and engaged in self-analysis, which involved painting while blindfolded to remove himself from all of his customary habits and facility.

Returning to New York in 1951, Olitski received his B.A. in 1952 and his M.A. in 1954 in art education, both from New York University.

== Career ==
Glow On (1963), The Phillips Collection

Olitski had his first one-person show at Galerie Huit, Paris in 1951. He returned to New York, and reacting against the color and imagery of his Paris works, began to paint monochromatic pictures with empty centers. He divorced and began exhibiting in group shows, and by 1956 was remarried and had joined the faculty of C. W. Post College on Long Island. In 1958 he had his first New York one-person show, at the Zodiac Room of the Alexander Iolas Gallery, and met Clement Greenberg, who exhibited Olitski's paintings in a large solo show at French & Company in May 1959.

In 1960 Olitski abruptly moved away from the heavily encrusted abstract surfaces he had developed and began to stain canvases with large areas of thin, brightly colored dyes. These were shown at a second French & Co. exhibit, in April 1961, and he was asked to join the Poindexter Gallery, where he had several exhibitions. Thereafter he exhibited in numerous venues, won a prize at the Carnegie International, and began to be collected by museums.

By 1965 Olitski had evolved an innovative technique of laying down atmospheric blankets of colored spray on the canvas, marked at first by barely discernible straight-edged value changes near the edge of the picture and later by acrylic paint dragged along portions of the edge. His style "combined the titanic reverb of Mark Rothko with the mischievous optical winks Wassily Kandinsky made famous". In the 1970s Olitski returned to the thick impasto surfaces that characterized his work in the 1950s but with innovative techniques that took advantage of the newly improved polymer and gel acrylic mediums.

He exhibited internationally in the late 1960s and was selected as one of four artists to represent the United States at the Venice Biennale in 1966. In 1969 he was invited to exhibit large, aluminum, spray-painted sculptures at the Metropolitan Museum of Art, becoming the first living American artist to be given a one-person exhibition there.

He taught at C.W. Post College from 1956 to 1963 and Bennington College from 1963 to 1967. In 1994 he was elected into the National Academy of Design.

His works from 2001 to 2007 are characterized by intensely colored orbs that evoke landscapes or skyscapes. Norman Kleeblatt wrote in the catalog that accompanied the exhibition Jules Olitski–The Late Paintings: A Celebration at Knoedler and Company: "The intensity of Olitski's colors can feel jarring when each colored area is observed separately. But the artist is a master of unlikely clashes of intense and artificial-looking colors recalling Delacroix."

Olitski had over 150 one-person exhibitions in his lifetime and is represented in museums worldwide. He received honorary doctorates from the University of Hartford, Keene State College, and Southern New Hampshire University. His estate is represented by YaresArt.

In 2024, Olitski's work was included in Every Sound Is a Shape of Time: Selections from PAMM's Collection at the Pérez Art Museum Miami, alongside Mark Bradford, Helen Frankenthaler, Richard Serra, and Louis Morris, among others.

== Personal life ==
Olitski lived and worked in studios in New Hampshire and Florida and exhibited regularly until his death from cancer in 2007, aged 84.

He married Gladys Katz in 1945 (one daughter Eve, divorced circa 1955), Andrea Hill Pearce in 1956 (one daughter Lauren, divorced circa 1974), and Joan C. Gorby (a.k.a. Kristina) in 1980.

== Criticism ==
Swedish art critic Ulf Linde mentioned Olitski as an example of "visual muzak" in the interview text Om det genant enkla (About that which is awkwardly simple), published in 1999.

In a New York Times review on October 14, 2005, Roberta Smith called Olitski "an artist who, if he hasn't quite come full circle, has always combined a penchant for flash and visual drama with a keen interest in the physicality of paint, whether thin, as in his stained and spray-painted abstractions of the 1960s, or thick." In 2021, Smith wrote: "The artist’s earliest Color Field paintings, with their indomitable colors, austere compositions and wild pictorial spaces, are among the movement’s signal achievements".

Karen Wilkin wrote in The New Criterion in January 2021 that Olitski was "one of the most radical and innovative abstract painters of the recent past."

== Publications ==
- Jules Olitski: Catalog for the exhibition at the Museum of Fine Arts, Boston. Introduction by Kenworth Moffett. Chronology by Elinor L. Woron. 1973.
- Jules Olitski: Catalog for the retrospective exhibition at the Buschlen-Mowatt Gallery, Vancouver, BC. Preface by Barrie Mowatt. Introduction by Clement Greenberg. 1989.
- Poster, Lauren, ed. (2005). Jules Olitski: The New Hampshire Exhibits, Autumn 2003. Essay by Jim Walsh. Interview by John Walters. Four Forty.
