= QOR =

QOR may refer to:

- The Queen's Own Rifles of Canada, a Canadian Forces airborne infantry regiment based in Toronto, Ontario
- Quality of results, a term used in evaluating technological processes
- QoR Watercolors by Golden Artist Colors, a "Quality of Results" line of modern watercolor paints.
- Quality of Resilience (QoR), an electrical engineering term
- qor gene, a gene in human DNA
- Kor (Star Trek), character in the Star Trek universe
- Qor, a school of dark magic in the game Meridian 59
