= Magna (paint) =

Brand name of an acrylic resin paint

Magna paints in original packaging

Magna is the brand name of an acrylic resin paint, developed by Leonard Bocour and sold by Bocour Artist Colors, Inc. in 1947. It is somewhat different from modern acrylic paint, as it is composed of pigments ground in an acrylic resin brought into emulsion through the use of solvents. Magna paint has more of a shine to it than most modern acrylic paint, a glossier finish. In 1960, Bocour Artist Colors developed a water-borne acrylic paint named Aqua-Tec. Modern acrylic paint is water-soluble, while Magna is miscible with turpentine or mineral spirits, though both can dry rapidly to a matte or glossy finish. It was used by artists such as Barnett Newman, Morris Louis, and Roy Lichtenstein. Roy Lichtenstein used Magna with oil paints.

== Modern equivalent ==
Golden Artist Colors produces Mineral Spirit Acrylics as a direct replacement for Magna. Any differences between the two are small, if any, and Roy Lichtenstein used them for that purpose. If anything, he thought the available color spectrum of MSA Conservation Color was better than Bocour's Magna.

== See also ==
- Sam Golden
- Liquitex
