= Quality of results =

Quality of Results (QoR) is a term used in evaluating technological processes. It is generally represented as a vector of components, with the special case of uni-dimensional value as a synthetic measure.

== History ==
The term was coined by the electronic design automation (EDA) industry in the late 1980s. QoR was meant to be an indicator of the performance of integrated circuits (chips), and initially measured the area and speed of a chip. As the industry evolved, new chip parameters were considered for coverage by the QoR, illustrating new areas of focus for chip designers (for example power dissipation, power efficiency, routing overhead, etc.). Because of the broad scope of quality assessment, QoR eventually evolved into a generic vector representation comprising a number of different values, where the meaning of each vector value was explicitly specified in the QoR analysis document.

Currently the term is gaining popularity in other sectors of technology, with each sector using its own appropriate components.

== Current trends in EDA ==
Originally, the QoR was used to specify absolute values such as chip area, power dissipation, speed, etc. (for example, a QoR could be specified as a {100 MHz, 1W, 1 mm^{2}} vector), and could only be used for comparing the different achievements of a single design specification. The current trend among designers is to include normalized values in the QoR vector, such that they will remain meaningful for a longer period of time (as technologies change), and/or across broad classes of design. For example, one often uses – as a QoR component – a number representing the ratio between the area required by a combinational logic block and the area required by a simple logic gate, this number being often referred to as "relative density of combinational logic". In this case, a relative density of five will generally be accepted as good quality of result – relative density of combinational logic component – while a relative density of fifty will indicate severe design problems (routability, technology that is being used, etc.) which should be investigated and addressed.

Note: A new term "Quality of Silicon" (QoS) is being promoted by the EDA industry in an attempt to measure the performance of backend EDA tools in isolation from the human designer's own performance in the frontend design stage. It is claimed that for historical reasons QoR is, and should remain, a measure of frontend design performance, while QoS should be reserved for analysing the performance of the backend-related flow. However, with front-end designers being increasingly concerned with and involved in various backend stages of the design, a large number of QoS parameters are also being included in the QoR analysis vectors.
