= Golden Artist Colors =

American art material manufacturer

Golden
- Industry: Art materials
- Predecessor: Bocour Artist Colors (1950s)
- Founded: 1980; 46 years ago
- Founder: Sam Golden
- Headquarters: New Berlin, New York, United States
- Key people: Adele Golden, Mark Golden, Barbara Golden; Chuck Kelly
- Products: Acrylic, oil, watercolor
- Website: goldenpaints.com

Golden Artist Colors, or simply Golden, is an U.S. manufacturing company that focuses on paints used in fine art, decoration, and crafts. Based in New Berlin, New York, the company produces a line of acrylic paints that includes some recreations of historic pigments. Golden also manufactures the 'Williamsburg' line of artists' oil paints, QoR watercolors, as well as lines of decorative and architectural paints and mediums.

Golden Artist Colors has collaborated with artists on significant mural projects, including: the Michlalah murals in Jerusalem by Archie Rand, Venus by Knox Martin, and indoor murals by Frank Stella and Roy Lichtenstein.

== History ==
During the 1930s, Sam Golden joined his uncle Leonard Bocour, forming a partnership in the paint company Bocour Artist Colors. They produced hand-ground oil colors for artists and they called their oil paint tubes and jars Bellini. Their store in Manhattan became a hangout for artists through the early 1950s. Artists such as Barnett Newman, Mark Rothko, Willem de Kooning, Jackson Pollock, Helen Frankenthaler, Knox Martin and Jack Levine would get paint there and visit with Golden and Bocour (also a painter).

Between 1946 and 1949, and after a process of experimentation, the first artist acrylic paint was ready for sale called Magna. One of the first artists to use Magna paint was Morris Louis. Eventually, Bocour Artist Colors developed a water-soluble version of acrylic paint called Aquatec.

In June 1980, ten years after Sam Golden retired from the Bocour Artist Colors company, he founded Golden Artist Colors, Inc. with his wife Adele, son Mark, daughter-in-law Barbara Golden and partner Chuck Kelly. They began making paint in a 900-square-foot (84 m^{2}), renovated barn in upstate New York.

The company received many awards including the 1991 Business Arts Award by the Chenango County Chamber of Commerce and the Council of the Arts. Mark Golden received the 1996 Small Business Person of the Year from the United States Small Business Administration. Golden Artist Colors was featured on NBC Nightly News as a successful small business. In 1998, Mark Golden was selected by Fortune Magazine to appear in its video series on small business. In 2002 Goldens became an ESOP and will be 100% ESOP in 2020
