= Leonard Bocour =

American businessman, art collector, and artist (1910–1993)

Leonard Bocour (March 18, 1910 – September 6, 1993) was an American artist.

Bocour was born in New York City. Around 1933, he formed the New York City based company Bocour Artists Colors. He was the co-developer along with Sam Golden of Magna paint in the late 1940s. From 1952 until 1970, he and Sam Golden were partners in the Bocour Artists Colors Co. The company sold artist paints from the late 1930s until the 1990s. Many well-known artists from Mark Rothko, Jackson Pollock and Willem de Kooning to Helen Frankenthaler, Morris Louis, Knox Martin, Kenneth Noland, and hundreds of others bought paint from Leonard Bocour. The tubes of paint marked Bocour were watercolor or oil paint and the tubes labeled Bellini were oil paint. The acrylic paint was thick bodied and called Aquatec.

He was a serious art collector, in addition to being a well-known paint manufacturer. He collected and owned works by many of his now famous customers. Bocour donated part of his collection to St. Mary's College of Maryland.

== See also ==
- Sam Golden
- Golden Artist Colors
- Magna paint
