= Sam Golden =

American inventor (1915–1997)

- Born: May 20, 1915
- Died: March 11, 1997 (aged 81); Upstate New York, U.S.
- Occupations: Inventor; businessman
- Relatives: Leonard Bocour (uncle)

Sam Golden (May 20, 1915 – March 11, 1997) started his paintmaking career in 1936 at Bocour Artist Colors with his uncle Leonard Bocour. In 1947, he developed Magna paint, the world's first artist acrylic paint. He returned from retirement in 1980 to found Golden Artist Colors Inc. based in New Berlin, New York, with his son Mark Golden.

Sam and Leonard began by producing hand ground oil colors for artists in Manhattan as the New York School of Painters was coming into its own and New York City was becoming the arts center of the world. Artists like Willem de Kooning, Barnett Newman and Morris Louis were regular visitors at the Bocour shop on 15th street. They would set up their drawing pads or easels and draw or paint in the tiny shop. It was Sam's work directly with artists and the products he developed in collaboration with these painters that became the inspiration for his entire paint-making career. Sam is credited with the development of the first artist acrylic, the first phthalocyanine artist paints, the first iridescent artist colors, the first stable alizarin color in acrylic, the first stable zinc white in acrylic and the development of water tension breaker. Sam Golden died in upstate New York March 11, 1997.

== See also ==
- Oil paint
- Paint
- Watercolor paint
