= List of public art in Victoria, British Columbia =

List of public artworks in Victoria, British Columbia

This is a list of public art in Victoria, British Columbia, Canada. It includes sculptures, fountains, monuments, and other works of public art located throughout the city.

== Works ==
| Image | Title / subject | Location and coordinates | Date | Artist / designer | Type | Material | Dimensions | Designation | Owner / administrator | Notes |
|---|---|---|---|---|---|---|---|---|---|---|
| | 100th Anniversary of the Canadian Navy | | 2010 | Nathan Scott | sculpture | | | | | |
| More images | British Columbia Law Enforcement Memorial | | | | sculpture | | | | | |
| More images | British Columbia Legislature Cenotaph | | 1925 | Vernon and Sidney March | sculpture | Bronze | | | | |
| More images | Fallen Paramedics Memorial | | 2015 | | sculpture | Granite | | | | |
| More images | Front Fountain | | 1906 | Hooper & Watkins | fountain, sculpture | | | | | |
| More images | Gate of Harmonious Interest | Chinatown, Victoria | 1981 | | | | | | | |
| More images | Knowledge Totem Pole | | 1994 | Cicero August | sculpture | | | | | |
| More images | Statue of John Sebastian Helmcken | Helmcken House | 2011 | Armando Barbon | sculpture | | | | | |
| More images | Statue of Queen Victoria | | | Richard McBride | sculpture | | | | | |
| More images | Victoria Centennial Fountain | | 1962 | Robert Savery | fountain, sculpture | | | | | |

== See also ==
- List of public art in Halifax, Nova Scotia
- List of public art in Montreal
