= List of public art in Halifax, Nova Scotia =

This is a list of permanent public art in Halifax, Nova Scotia.

The list contains only works of permanent public art freely accessible in public spaces, and not, for example, works inside museums that charge admission, or that are installed for short-term display.

== Artworks ==
Image	Title	Location	Year	Artist / Designer	Notes
	Lace Up	Emera Oval; 44.649564°N 63.587751°W	2013	Ilan Sandler	Commissioned to commemorate the 2011 Canada Winter Games
	The Wave	Halifax Boardwalk; 44.647173°N 63.570023°W	c. 1986	Donna Hiebert	
	Samuel Cunard	Halifax Seaport; 44.641135°N 63.566541°W	2006	Peter Bustin	
	The Emigrant	Halifax Seaport; 44.641401°N 63.566777°W	2013	Armando Barbon	Bronze and marble. Depicts an emigrant leaving his home country to start a new life in Canada.
	Saunders Park memorial sculpture	Saunders Park; 44.646305°N 63.611132°W	1966	Fairey Canada Ltd.	The park is named after Donald Saunders, aviator, and manager of the Halifax Civic Airport at this location, 1931-1941.
	Robert Burns	Victoria Park; 44.641888°N 63.579919°W		George Anderson Lawson	
	Walter Scott	Victoria Park; 44.640992°N 63.579374°W			
	North Is Freedom	Halifax North Memorial Public Library; 44.654026°N 63.585995°W	2007	Doug Bamford and Stephen Brathwaite	Named for a George Elliott Clarke poem, the monolith has four lines written by the poet about the surrounding neighbourhood which he considers his home, and other words that tell the story of the local community. The monolith is made from Corten steel.
	Marine Venus	University Avenue, Dalhousie University; 44.6374°N 63.5882°W	1967	Robert Hedrick	Commissioned for Expo 67, donated to Dalhousie University in 1969 by Seagram.
	Sailors' Memorial	Sackville Landing; 44.64693°N 63.57078°W		Peter Bustin	
	Sir Winston Churchill	Grafton Park; 44.643914°N 63.574501°W	1980	Oscar Nemon	
	Bronze Kindred Spirits	Alderney Gate, Dartmouth; 44.6642°N 63.5685°W	1990	Dawn McNutt	
	Halifax Explosion Memorial Bell Tower	Fort Needham; 44.6657°N 63.6012°W	1985	Core Design Group	
	Life	Ben's Bakery, Quinpool Road; 44.6453°N 63.5970°W	1968	Joseph Drapell	
	Origins	Ondaatje Courtyard, Art Gallery of Nova Scotia; 44.6483°N 63.5729°W	1995	John Greer	
	Humangination	Barrington Street; 44.6428°N 63.5717°W	1979	Adrien Francescutti	
	The Iron Worker	Macdonald Bridge Dartmouth end 44.6696°N 63.5776°W	2005	Peter Bustin	
	"Harbour Lookoff" sign	Point Pleasant Park; 44.6269°N 63.5654°W		School of Architecture, Technical University of Nova Scotia	
	Celtic Cross	George Street; 44.6487°N 63.5725°W	2000		Donated by Charitable Irish Society of Halifax
	Weldon sculptures	University Avenue; 44.6379°N 63.5874°W	1968	Gord Smith	Two sculptures by the same artist – one in the forecourt and one in the building lobby.
	Vytaiemo	Peace and Friendship Park; 44.6400°N 63.5692°W	1992	Dawn McNutt	Sponsored by Ukrainian Canadian Congress.
	Custom House Lions	Granville Mall	1904		Reassembled at current site in January 2005.

== Removed public art ==
Image	Title	Location	Year	Artist / Designer	Notes
	Edward Cornwallis	Cornwallis Park (now Peace and Friendship Park); 44.639824°N 63.569594°W	1931	J. Massey Rhind	Removed on January 31, 2018 and placed in storage.
	Orzo (a.k.a. The Kiss)	South Park Street; 44.64363°N 63.58023°W	1981	Adrien Francescutti	One of three statues made of granite from a staircase removed from a building on Barrington Street. Removed on November 26, 2014 and temporarily relocated to the garden of a private homeowner while the adjacent YMCA is redeveloped.
	20th Century Student	Dalhousie University; 44.643914°N 63.574406°W	1968	Reg Dockrill	Removed in 2012 due to corrosion and structural damage.
	Halifax Explosion Memorial Sculpture	Halifax North Memorial Library; 44.6540°N 63.5859°W	1966	Jordi Bonet	Removed in 2004 and replaced with North is Freedom.
	Bird of Spring	Ondaatje Courtyard (formerly Cheapside Park), Art Gallery of Nova Scotia; 44.6482°N 63.5727°W	1988	Abraham Etungat	Removed

== See also ==
- List of public art in Montreal
- List of public art in Victoria, British Columbia
