= Citius, Altius, Fortius =

Citius, Altius, Fortius (Latin for "Faster, Higher, Stronger") may refer to:

- Citius, Altius, Fortius (Olympic motto)
- Journal of Olympic History, formerly Citius, Altius, Fortius
- Citius, Altius, Fortius, an artwork by Jordi Bonet in a metro station in Montreal, Canada
