= Irene Neal =

American painter

Irene Neal is an American painter. She graduated from Wilson College in Chambersburg, Pennsylvania, in 1958. She was a member of the New New Painters, a group of artists brought together by the first curator of modern and contemporary art at the Boston Museum of Fine Arts, Dr. Kenworth Moffett (1934–2016) in 1978, contemporaneously with the further development of acrylic gel paint as developed by the paint chemist Sam Golden.

Kenworth Moffett suggested, "Irene Neal works in the tradition of large size, free form abstraction, originating with Jackson Pollock, the Abstract Expressionists, and the Color Field Painters". Reviewing Neal's work for The New York Times, William Zimmer wrote: "Neal favors amorphous formats that resemble liquid drops, and often she creates a sheen like that of semi-precious stones." Donald Kuspit, in reviewing Neal's paintings in 2021, stated that in her paintings there is "fresh, newborn colors and exciting, impassioned rhythms of color—a glorious symphony of eternally fresh colors..."
