= Halifax Explosion (disambiguation) =

The Halifax Explosion was a disaster caused by an accidental munitions explosion in 1917 in Halifax Harbour, Nova Scotia.

Halifax Explosion may also refer to:

- Halifax Explosion Memorial Sculpture, a sculpture erected in memoriam of the disaster in 1966, decommissioned in 2004
- Halifax Explosion (drink) or Rev-Bomb, introduced 2000, a cocktail
- Halifax Pop Explosion, started in 1993, an annual music festival

== See also ==
- Shattered City: The Halifax Explosion, a 2003 TV miniseries on the disaster
- Shattered City: The Halifax Explosion and the Road to Recovery, a 1989 book on the disaster
