= Marcel Paquet =

Belgian philosopher (1947–2014)

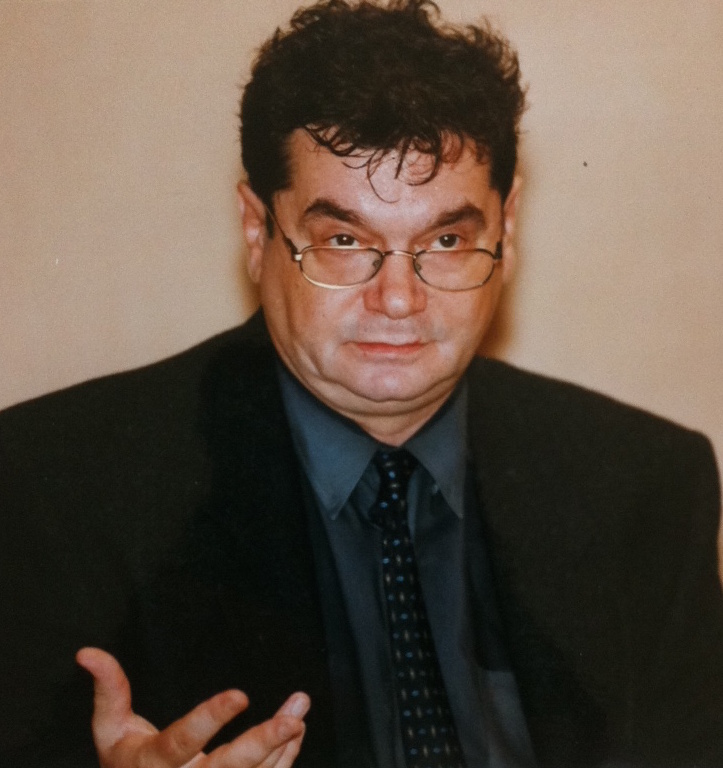
- Marcel Paquet
- Born: 21 February 1947; Jumet, near Charleroi, Belgium
- Died: 22 November 2014 (aged 67); Poznań, Poland
- Children: Raphael Paquet 1976 Alexandre Paquet 1981 Hadrien Paquet 1984

Philosophical work
- Era: 20th-century philosophy
- Region: Western philosophy
- Main interests: Ontology • Political Philosophy; Esthetics

Marcel Paquet (21 February 1947 – 22 November 2014) was a Belgian philosopher. The most important influences on his thought were Spinoza, Kant, Hegel, Nietzsche, Heidegger and Michel Foucault.

Paquet rejected all forms of Idealism in favor of the sensory world. Insofar as he considered human beings to be no more than fragments of nature, thought was considered by him to be the result of cerebral processes which operate largely beneath the level of consciousness. He insisted on the pre-eminence of the body and the fact that, for this reasons, consciousness observes the results of thought, but does not bring them into being.

Inspired by Nietzsche's notion of Eternal Recurrence - which Paquet treated not as a doctrine but an operational principle, that is as a means of disentangling ourselves from secondary aspects of our identity (determined by cultural, religious and moral factors) in order to recover our primary nature - he considered a return to the body as the sole ethical value.

He developed this Spinozan theme in a number of different directions: ontology (L'enjeu de la philosophie, Platon: l’éternel retour de la liberté), political philosophy (Nous autres Européens, Le Fascisme Blanc) and esthetics, the latter in particular in relation to painting which he defined as the art of rendering the sensory visible. He is the author of a large number of essays consecrated to visual artists whom he knew personally: Jean Dubuffet, Alexander Calder, André Masson, René Magritte, Paul Delvaux, Fernando Botero, Sophia Vari, Corneille (one of the six founders of the Cobra movement), Bram Bogart, Anna Wilczynska-Wilska, Amann.

He is also the author of several philosophical novels, namely Renaissance sécondaire, Merde à Jésus, L’affaire Socrate and Marie et les Jean.

He died in Poznań, Poland, on 22 November 2014.

== Life ==
Paquet was born in Jumet, near Charleroi. According to his own account, he had an unhappy childhood. He sought refuge in books, and in particular in Spinoza's Ethics and in Nietzsche's Antichrist. A school trip to London allowed him to discover the works of William Turner; later a visit to Amsterdam gave rise to his passion for the works of Rembrandt and Van Gogh as well as allowing him to meet the situationist painter and architect Constant, whose work Het Opstand van de Homo ludens ("The uprising of Homo Ludens") he translated into French.

He matriculated at the Free University of Brussels in 1964 and in 1967 became assistant to Professor Pierre Verstraeten. His graduation dissertation dealt with the problem of unity in Kant's thought in the Critique of Judgment (L’unité problématique du kantisme dans la Critique de la force de juger).

In 1971, he became a junior associate ("aspirant") at the Belgian National Fund for Scientific Research.

He did research into fanaticism and published a number of articles including "Essai sur l’absolu" (Essay on the concept of the Absolute) which brought him to the attention of French philosopher Gérard Lebrun and led to a professorship in the history of German Philosophy at the University of Tunis.

It was during his period in Tunis, which lasted from 1972 to 1974, that he wrote his first published work L’enjeu de la philosophie ("The Question of Philosophy") and he began work on his doctoral dissertation on "The difference between the thought of Kant and Hegel on the question of the essence of art" (La différence des pensées de Kant et de Hegel dans la question de l’essence de l’art.

In 1975, he was one of the founders of the publishing house Les Éditions de la Différence.

In 1978, he obtained his doctorate and continued to work on issues related to painting (René Magritte, Paul Delvaux, Fernando Botero).

In 1981, he took part, together with Hans-Georg Gadamer in the colloquium "1881: The great year of Zarathustra" organised at the Brock University of Saint-Catharines in Canada: he made a presentation of his concept of "dansité", a play on words which suggests both "innerness" and dance, which was later incorporated into his book Magritte ou l’éclipse de l’être.

He subsequently took up residence in Canada, where he lived in Ontario and for a time in Quebec.

In 1988, he taught French literature at the University of Udine in Italy.

Upon his return to Belgium, he made the acquaintance of Bram Bogart in relation to whom he wrote a number of articles.

In Paris in 1990 he met a number of artists of the "New New Painting" group and developed a theoretical account of their artistic approach, set out in a work published by the publishing house Nouvelles éditions françaises.

In 1993, he created the "École européenne de philosophie de Charleroi". This school organized amongst other things courses on the concept of "ethical conciliation" and on a draft political constitution for Wallonia which Paquet drew up.

In 1996, he took up residence in Biarritz where in 1997 he married the painter Anna Wilczynska-Wilska. He organized a retrospective dedicated to Bram Bogart and various events devoted to the painter Amann and the pictorial movement of "New Pigmentation".

== Publications ==
=== Essays ===
- L’enjeu de la Philosophie, éditions de la Différence, Paris, 133pp., 1976, ISBN 978 2729100070
- Michel Journiac, l’ossuaire de l’esprit, éditions de la Différence, Paris, 1977
- Magritte ou l’éclipse de l’être, éditions de la Différence, Paris, 1982, ISBN 978 2729100254
- Botero, Philosophie de la création, éditions Ferragus, Paris, 1985, ISBN 978 2905647009
- Corneille ou la sensualité du sensible, éditions Delille, Paris, 137pp., 1988, ISBN 978 2906510012
- Bogart, éditions de la Différence, series Mains et Merveilles, Paris, 1990, ISBN 978 2729112158
- Paul Delvaux et l'essence de la peinture, Éditions de La Différence, Paris, 1992, ISBN 978-2729101053
- Saturne et Jupiter, Éditions de La Différence, Paris, 1992, ISBN 978-2729100346
- New New Painting, Nouvelles éditions françaises, Paris, 1992, ISBN 978-2707900319
- Dubuffet, Nouvelles éditions françaises, Paris, 1993, ISBN 978-2203451117
- René Magritte, la pensée visible, Taschen, Cologne, 1993, ISBN 978 3822861646
- Zuniga: Sculptures, Éditions de La Différence, Paris, 1996, ISBN 978-2729102050
- Le Fascisme Blanc; mésaventures de la Belgique, éditions de la Différence, Paris, 1998, ISBN 978 2729112288
- Plein air : Sculptures monumentales de Sosno, ed. Z'Editions, 1998, ISBN 978-2877202404
- Orsini, ed. Cercle d'Art, 2002, ISBN 978-2702206478
- Nous autres Européens, éditions de la Différence, Paris, 2004, ISBN 978 2729115159
- Platon, l’éternel retour de la liberté, éditions de la Différence, Paris, 2007, ISBN 978 2729116651
- Botero, Essai d’analyse philosophique, éditions aBac, Biarritz, 2012, ISBN 978 2953517415
- Rouge Absolu; Amann – Nouvelle Pigmentation, éditions de la Différence, Paris, 2012, ISBN 978 2729119522

=== Novels ===
- Merde à Jésus – Souvenirs de José de Nazareth, éditions de la Différence, Paris, 1989, ISBN 978 2729117948
- L'affaire Socrate, éditions de la Différence, Paris, 1989, ISBN 978 2729116668
- Renaissance secondaire, éditions de la Différence, Paris, 1990, ISBN 978 2729104894
- Marie et les Jean – Souvenirs de José de Nazareth II, éditions de la Différence, Paris, 2009, ISBN 978 2729117948

=== Articles and speeches ===
- "Pour un sénat européen et transfrontalier des régions", in Questions Régionales et citoyenneté européenne, éd. de l’Université de Liège, Liege, 2000
- "Spinoza et le problème du fanatisme", in Annales de l’institut de Philosophie de l’ULB, Brussels, 1972
- "Hegel et le fanatisme", in Annales de l’institut de Philosophie de l’ULB, Brussels, 1972
- "Politique de théâtre; morale sartrienne et gracieuse dialectique", in Revue de l’Université Libre de Bruxelles, Brussels, 1970
- "Nietzsche et l’art moderne", in The great year of Zarathoustra (1881-1981), ed. David Goicoechea, University press of America, 1983
- "L'Art de Hegel", in Franco et al, Hegel Aujourd'hui, Vrin, 1995, pp. 63–75, ISBN 2711612457
