= Bruce Piermarini =

American painter

Bruce Piemarini (born 1953, Leominster, Massachusetts, United States) is an American painter. He was a member of the New New Painters a group of artists first brought together by the first curator of modern and contemporary art at the Boston Museum of Fine Arts, Dr. Kenworth Moffett (1934 - 2016) in 1978 contemporaneously with the further development of acrylic gel paint as developed by the paint chemist Sam Golden.
