= Life (sculpture) =

Sculpture in Halifax, Nova Scotia

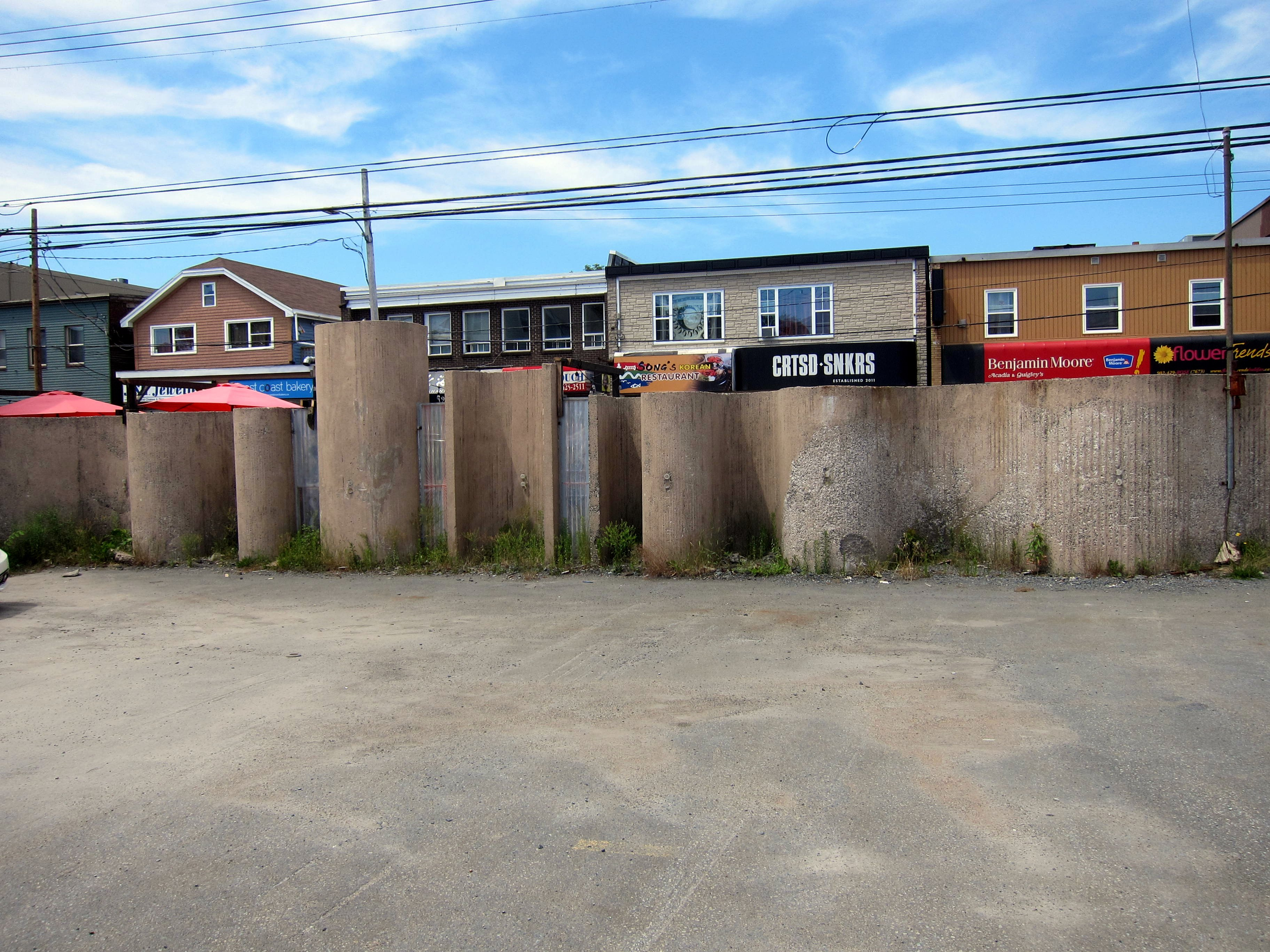
- Southern elevation of the sculpture
- Artist: Joseph Drapell
- Year: 1968
- Medium: Reinforced concrete, acrylic glass
- Dimensions: 3.7 m × 1.8 m × 19 m (12 ft × 6 ft × 65 ft)
- Location: Halifax, Nova Scotia
- 44.6453°N 63.5971°W

Life is a concrete sculpture on Quinpool Road, a commercial street in Halifax, Nova Scotia, Canada. It was commissioned in 1968 by Ben's Bakery and produced by painter Joseph Drapell.

== Background ==
Commissioned by Ben's Bakery, Life was designed by noted painter Joseph Drapell shortly after he emigrated from Czechoslovakia as a refugee, landing in Halifax in 1966. The piece, one of the artist's first professional works, sits along the edge of the bakery's former property, shielding an open-air car park and loading area from the commercial street beyond.

== Physical description ==
The sculpture is made of ferroconcrete and acrylic glass, the latter a relatively new product at the time. The concrete was once painted pink, and the glass scattered colourful sunlight onto the sidewalk. According to the artist, the piece is 65 feet long, 6 feet deep, and 12 feet high. There is a small plaque mounted at the eastern end of the sculpture, which bears the artist's name (rendered as "Josef Drapell"), the title of the piece, and "Halifax 1968".

== Concept ==
In 2015, Drapell explained the piece to the Canadian Broadcasting Corporation as follows:

The central form 'male' is tall, impenetrable; the central form 'female' is shorter and receptive. From the left and from the right 'the forces of living' compress both sexes with reality (concrete walls). The three glass boxes represent our intelligence, our feelings, our emotions and our rationality.

On sunny days, the sun plays in them with that extra uplift, on cloudy days everything is back to 'normal.' The pairs of Plexiglas rods cast into the concrete walls represent our curiosity and symbolize our desire to see beyond the concrete reality of our limited world.

In our explorations of the universe we sometimes succeed, or pay with our blood (the fluorescent red Plexiglas).

== Current condition ==
Today the sculpture is in poor condition. The concrete surface suffers from spalling, and large chunks have broken away from the base, exposing the corroding rebar. The acrylic glass has become cloudy.

In an effort to rehabilitate the piece, in 2006 the municipal government asked Halifax artist Philip Doucette to cover Life with mosaic tiles. After researching the sculpture's background, Doucette refused, stating that it would be "very egregious to modify someone's design and call it your own". He stated that the sculpture is a reminder of a young artist who immigrated to Halifax and went on to achieve international recognition, and asked, "do we keep the fact that he had been here in our memory? I think that's an important question."

In 2010, the city explored the possibility of moving the sculpture to the Halifax Common. Drapell asked the city to cover his expenses in overseeing the move, and the plan did not proceed.

== Future ==
In 2014, the Canada Bread Company, parent company of Ben's Bakery, was acquired by Grupo Bimbo of Mexico. In March 2015, it was announced that the 104-year-old Ben's Bakery would be shut down and the employees laid off, with production shifting to facilities in New Brunswick.

The bakery property was purchased by Westwood Developments, controlled by Danny Chedrawe, in November 2015. Westwood plans to build a mixed-use residential and retail development on the site, a plan that would affect the sculpture. The fate of Life has not been publicly revealed, but in early 2016 it was reported that the architects and developer were exploring ways to potentially incorporate the piece into the new development.

== Gallery ==
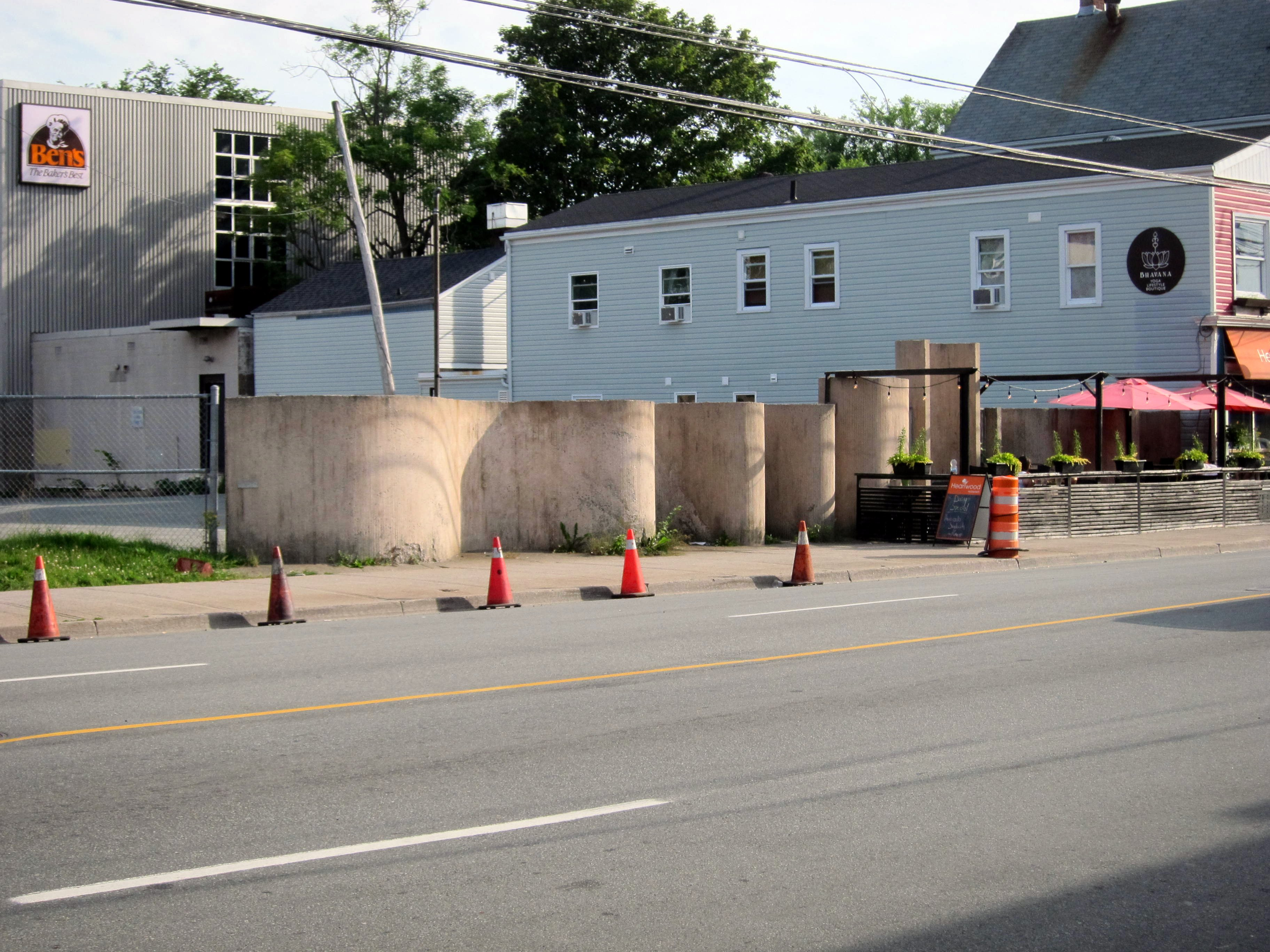
Viewed from the opposite side of Quinpool Road, the sculpture is partly obscured by a restaurant patio.

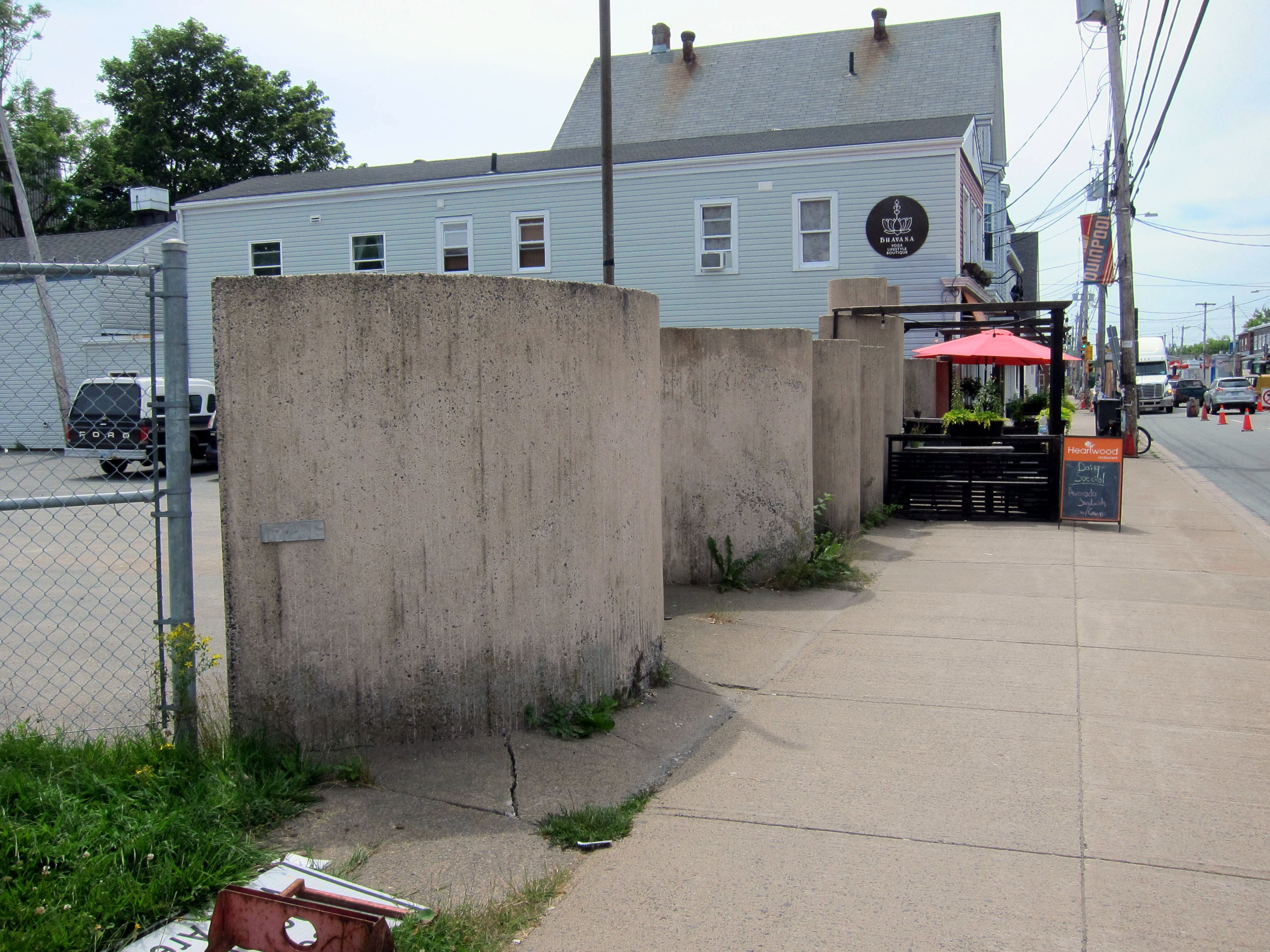
Eastern end of the sculpture, featuring a small plaque bearing the title of the sculpture

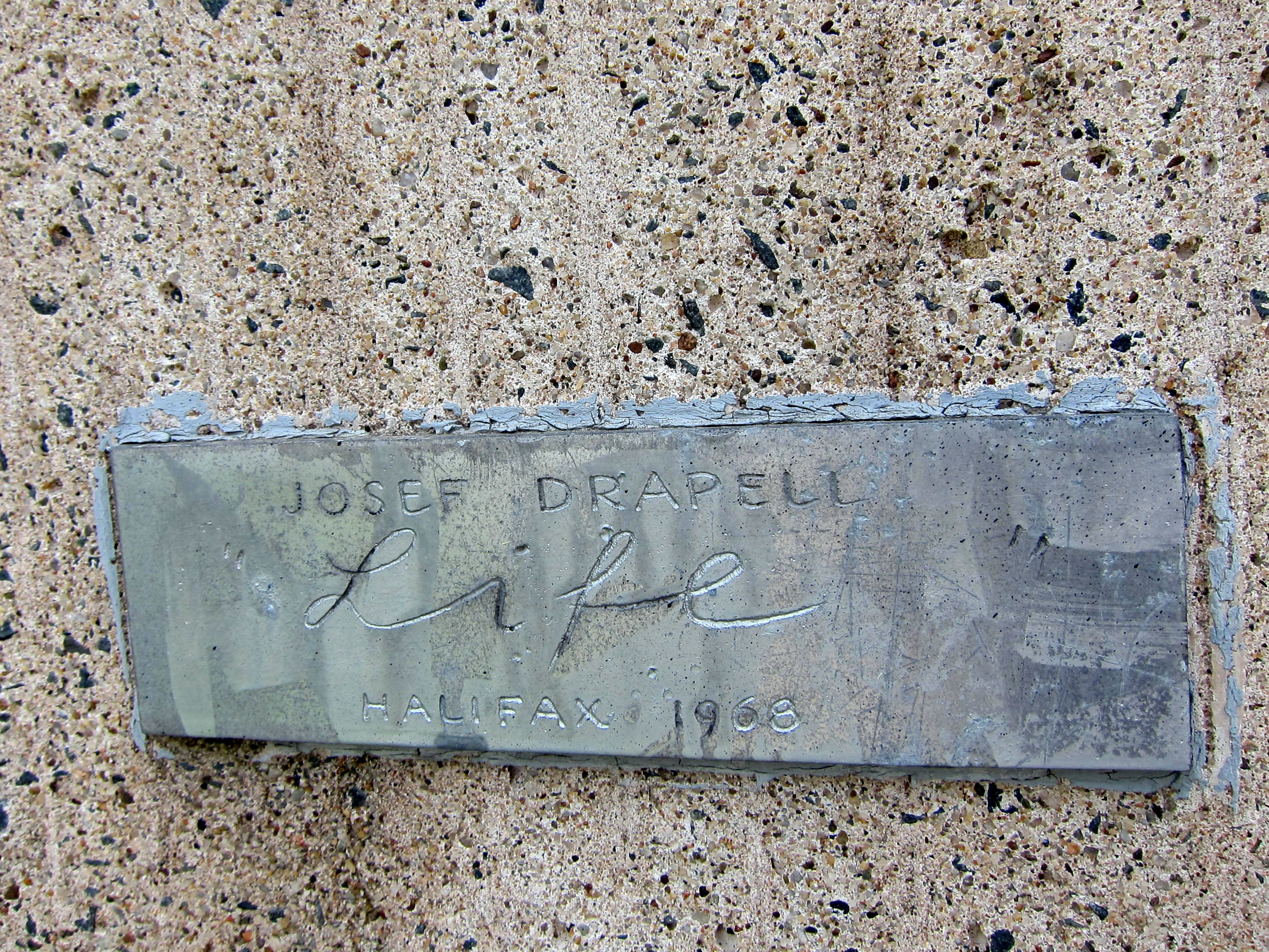
Close-up photo of the plaque

== See also ==
- List of public art in Halifax, Nova Scotia
