= Roy Lerner =

American painter (1954–2023)

Roy Lerner (1954–2023) was an internationally exhibited American painter.

Born in Chicago, Illinois, Lerner attended Franconia College, where he studied with the artist Peter Bradley. Early in his career Lerner was a gallery assistant to the British sculptor Anthony Caro. In 1987, he exhibited in a group exhibition the Fall Invitational at the Aldrich Museum of Contemporary Art in Ridgefield, Connecticut, with Ross Bleckner, Barry Le Va, Keung Szeto, Gary Stephan, and Deborah Remington.

Lerner was a member of the New New Painters, a group of artists brought together by the first curator of modern and contemporary art at the Boston Museum of Fine Arts, Dr. Kenworth Moffett (1934–2016), in 1978, contemporaneously with the further advancement of acrylic gel paint as developed by the paint chemist Sam Golden. Lerner is also considered a trailblazer in the visual genre of hypertexture.

Lerner taught at the Katonah Art Center and in 2019 he spoke and conducted a workshop at the Stamford Museum & Nature Center in Stamford, Connecticut.
