= New New Painters =

Group of eleven Canadian and US artists

The New New Painters were a self-labeled art group whose core members are twelve abstract artists (Lucy Baker, Steve Brent, Joseph Drapell, John Gittins, Roy Lerner, Anne Low, Marjorie Minkin, Irene Neal, Gérard Paire, Graham Peacock, Bruce Piermarini and Gerald Webster) who first came together in 1978 contemporaneously with the further development of acrylic gel paint as developed by the paint chemist Sam Golden. The NewNew Painters as they are called, arose from the roots of Jackson Pollock and Abstract Expressionism, The New York School, and Color Field (Morris Louis and Kenneth Noland from the Washington Color School, Helen Frankenthaler, Jules Olitski and Larry Poons, among others). The Color Field artists worked by staining on raw canvas, in close value, high key colors, often large scale. The artists of The New New Painters came together with a desire to move forward into a new kind of painting using acrylic gels. Unofficially the group members were exhibiting together in smaller groups up until 1992 when Gerald Piltzer asked Kenworth W. Moffett to curate an exhibition in his new gallery in Paris, France under the name "New New Painting". The term "New New Painting" was coined in a conversation between Graham Peacock and John Gittins and was used by Piltzer for the Paris Show and the hardcover catalog of the same name.

Kenworth Moffett brought this group together and championed them from its earliest inception, despite resistance from the Color Field painters, the art world at large, and the famed art critic Clement Greenberg. Moffett has staunchly submitted that The New New Painters had been overlooked by the New York City art world. Moffett wrote in 1992 in the Paris Exhibition catalogue "While not a formal organization, the artists featured in this book all know each other and feel themselves to be part of a group with a shared sensibility and common interests, just like the Impressionists, the Fauves, the Cubists, the Surrealists and the Abstract Expressionists before them. They all live in North America - in small towns in Connecticut and Massachusetts in the United States, and in the larger cities of Toronto and Edmonton in Canada. Many of them are still in their forties and in my view constitute the most exciting new movement or 'wave' of painters to appear in twenty-five years. For the first time since Color Field and Minimalism, modernist art has a whole new look and feel. It stands out by its aggressive aggressiveness of relief, texture, color and drawing."

In the same article, Moffett writes further: "Two strikingly novel features of the new work are very bright color - often fluorescent - and very thick, plastic paint" and from Belgian philosopher Marcel Paquet: "Thus, far from having been just a quick-fire, Abstract Expressionism has cleared the path to a new aesthetics, to a non-organic, multi-sensorial space in which the New Acrylic Painters are already ranking quite high. These young and resolute painters harbour the proof that art did not die at the end of Renaissance, but that it is just confronted at entirely new tasks-the first being to create a beauty of a new world."

== Critical views ==
Donald Kuspit said about the New New Painters in 1996: "They have broken out of the sterile, depleted cul de sac of post-painterly abstraction, bringing new life and intensity—depth and energy—to alloverness, in effect resurrecting it as a viable medium of creativity."

In his essay New New Painting and the History of American-Style Abstraction, the critic David Carrier said in 1999: "the New New Painters are providing some exciting fundamentally original ideas about how to understand abstraction ... I greatly admire the New New Painters for their determined persistence and their indifference to mere fashion."
