= Kenworth Moffett =

Kenworth W. Moffett (1934 – June 21, 2016) was an American art curator, museum director and author.

== Career ==
Moffett was born in East Orange, New Jersey and took a degree in art history at Columbia University, where he studied with Meyer Schapiro and Philip Pouncey, and graduated in 1960. He then pursued graduate work at Harvard University, earning a Ph.D. in 1968. His dissertation on German art critic Julius Meier-Graefe served as the foundation for his first book, Meier-Graefe as Art Critic (1973). A champion of Color Field painting, he wrote critical essays and reviews for major art periodicals including Artforum and Art International throughout the late '60s and 1970s. From 1968 to 1979, Moffett was a full professor of art history at Wellesley College.

In 1971, he was made founding curator of twentieth-century art at the Boston Museum of Fine Arts, where he organized exhibitions of sculptor Anthony Caro, painters Jules Olitski, Barnett Newman, Friedel Dzubas, and the first museum show of the realist Albert York. Moffett co-authored a monograph on Fairfield Porter, A Realist Painter in the Age of Abstraction with John Ashbery, among others, to accompany the 1983 Porter retrospective. In 1981, Moffett and colleague Theodore E. Stebbins, Jr., organized the first show of American art to travel to China following the Cultural Revolution. During his 13 years at the Boston Museum of Fine Arts, he oversaw the bequest of 26 paintings by Morris Louis, as well as acquisitions of over one hundred artworks, including paintings by Picasso, Matisse, Miró, Hans Hofmann, Jackson Pollock, and Helen Frankenthaler.

In 1989, he was appointed director of the Museum of Art Fort Lauderdale, where he remained until 1997. He departed the museum in order to promote the work of a group of abstract artists he called the "New New Painters". Lucy Baker, Steve Brent, Joseph Drapell, John Gittins, Roy Lerner, Anne Low, Marjorie Minkin, Irene Neal, Gérard Paire, Graham Peacock, Bruce Piermarini and Jerald Webster were among the artists Moffett included in exhibitions of the New New Painters. With Marcel Paquet, Moffett wrote a monograph on the group in 1992. The following year they were the subject of a large exhibition at the Museé d'Art Modern et d’Art Contemporian in Nice.

Moffett authored several books including monographs on Kenneth Noland, Jules Olitski, He died of complications from heart disease in Stamford, CT on June 21, 2016.
