= Halifax Explosion Memorial Sculpture =

Defunct public art piece in Nova Scotia

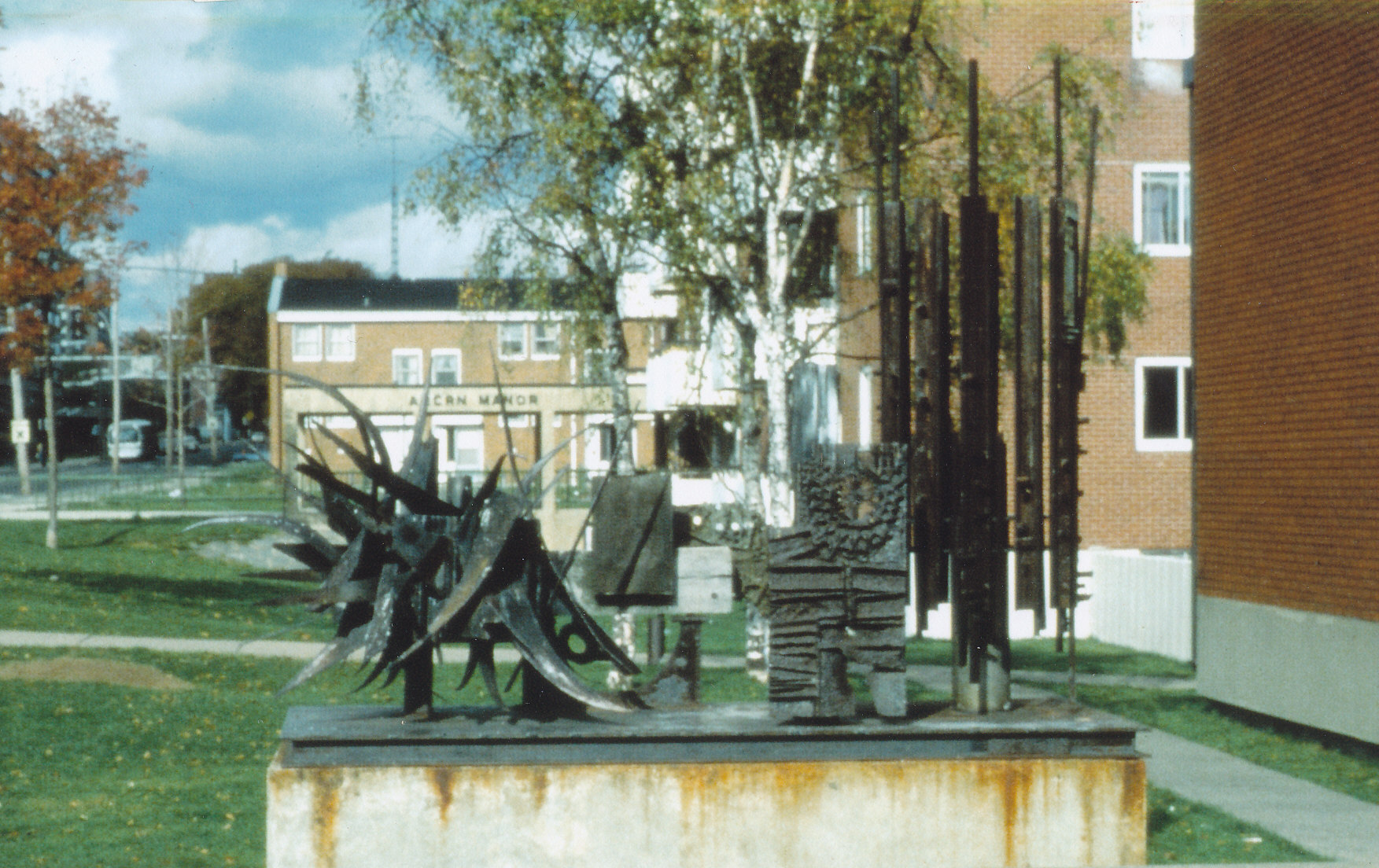
- Artist: Jordi Bonet
- Year: 1966
- Type: Steel, Bronze, Wood
- Dimensions: 3.0 m × 2.1 m × 4.6 m (10 ft × 7 ft × 15 ft)
- Location: Halifax, Nova Scotia, Canada

The Halifax Explosion Memorial Sculpture was a work of public art in Halifax, Nova Scotia, created in 1966 by the Quebec artist Jordi Bonet to commemorate the Halifax Explosion. The sculpture was located at the Halifax North Memorial Library but was dismantled in 2004 by the Halifax Regional Municipality and accidentally destroyed while in storage.

== Background ==
On December 6, 1917, almost 2000 people were killed by the accidental explosion of the French ammunition ship Mont-Blanc in Halifax Harbour. The Halifax Relief Commission was created to take over relief and rehabilitation work, as well as the reconstruction of the city. In 1965 the Relief Commission donated $100,000 to assist construction of library branch in the North End of Halifax which would serve as a memorial to those killed in the disaster. The library was built in 1966. As part of the new library, architects Keith L. Graham & Associates commissioned artist Jordi Bonet to create an outdoor sculpture that would commemorate the disaster and rebirth of the city. Bonet was a Spanish-born sculptor who worked in Quebec and who was known for his work with public art and spirituality.

== Design ==
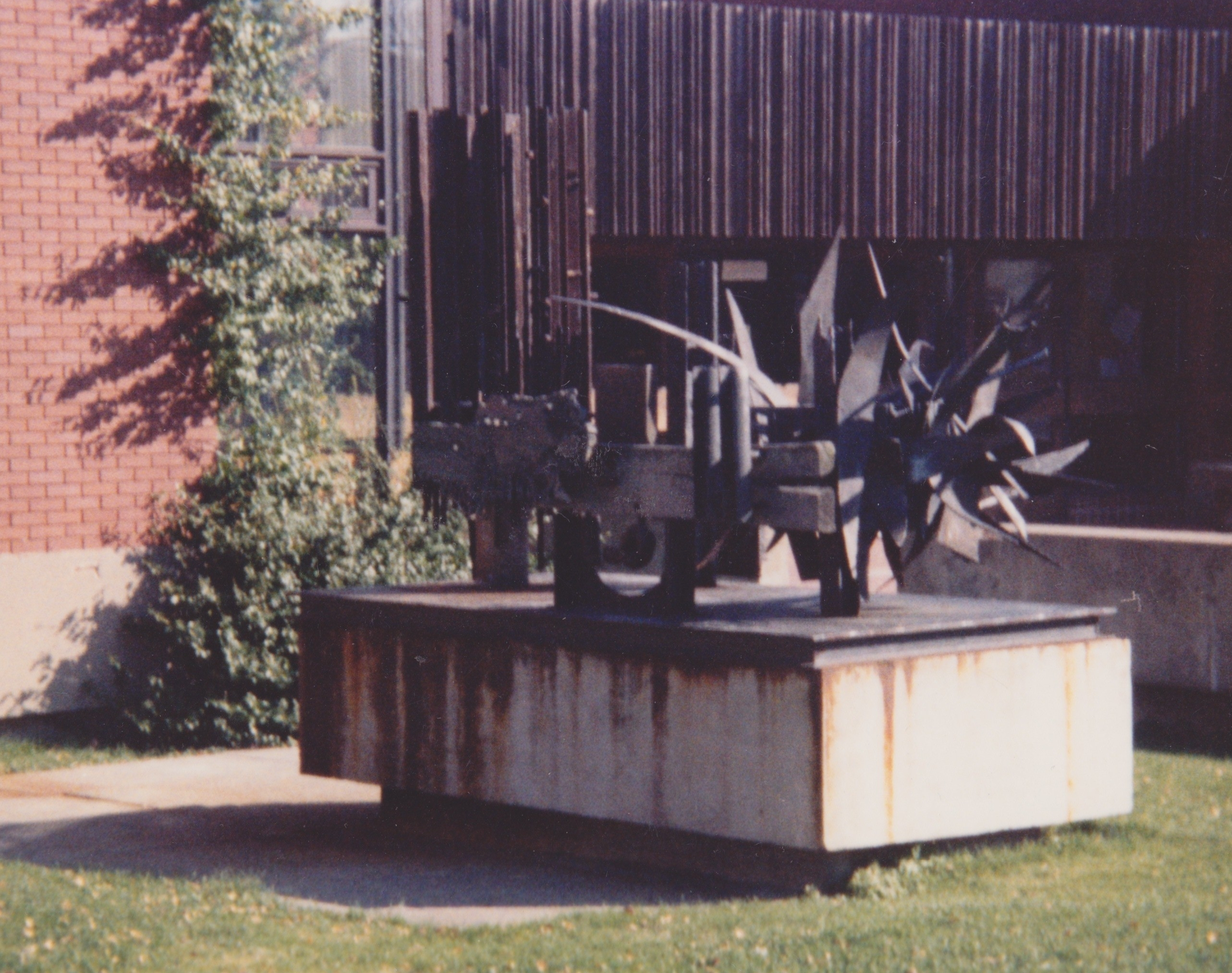
The sculpture viewed from the northwest in 1985

The sculpture was made of steel, iron, bronze and wood. Measuring 15 by 7 feet, it consisted of four parts. The first was a ball of jagged curved steel blades facing the street which symbolized the explosion. An actual fragment from the Mont-Blanc ammunition ship was attached to the base. The second part faced north and used bronze and battered wood to symbolize the human cost of the tragedy. It included a bronze casting with the outline of a doll symbolizing the hundreds of children who died. A third part facing south included a battered cogwheel representing industry and a bronze casting of a flower representing life. The fourth part, closest to the library, was a circular vertical column of uniform steel rods depicting the rebirth of the city.

== Removal and destruction ==
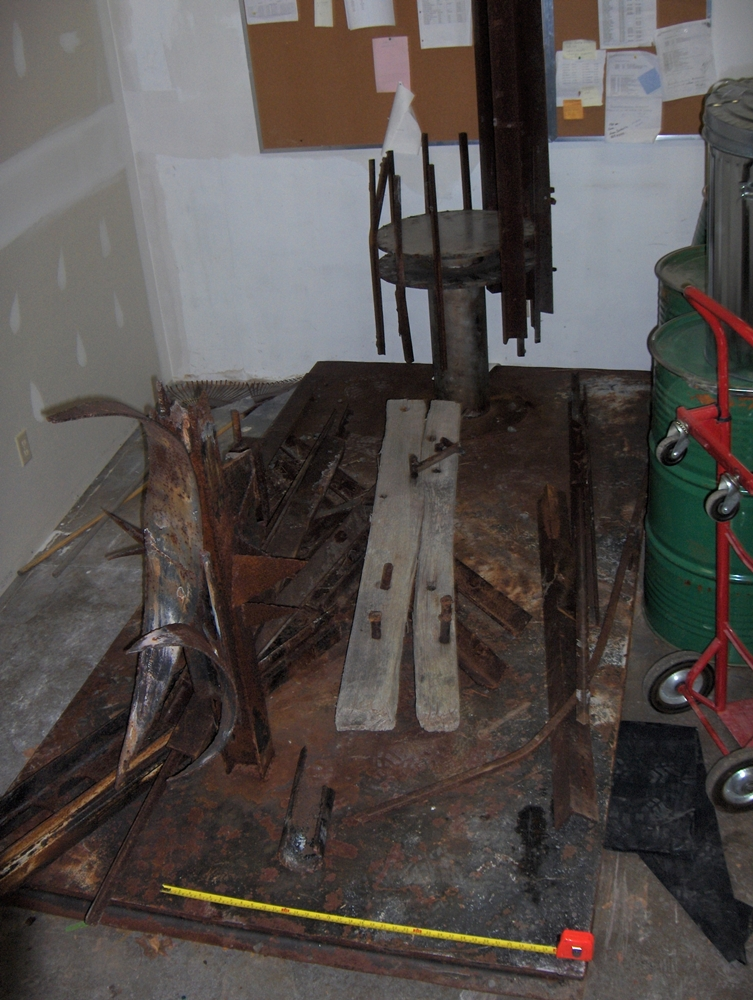
Remnants of the Memorial Sculpture after it was dismantled

Over 40 years the sculpture suffered some damage from exposure to weather. Damaged and detached parts were removed and stored at the library. In 2004 the sculpture was dismantled during library renovations which included reconstruction of the library courtyard. The sculpture was replaced by a new work North is Freedom by Doug Bamford and Stephen Brathwaite. According to the Halifax Regional Municipality, the sculpture could not be repaired and posed a safety risk and had to be stored while its fate was decided.

The sculpture was broken into pieces which were left unmarked and stored at various warehouses and city works yards across the city. A 2006 report by a consultant urged the city to identify the parts and bring them together. However this did not happen and several parts have disappeared including the key component known as "the doll", the bronze casting representing the children of the explosion. The fragment from Mont-Blanc which was included in the sculpture has been preserved at the Maritime Museum of the Atlantic.

In 2010 a committee of artists and citizens was formed to urge the Halifax Regional Municipality to secure the surviving pieces and conduct an inventory to determine whether the sculpture can be restored and reintroduced into the public realm. By the summer of 2011, the sculpture fragments had been brought together in a secure city storage location and the committee widened their search for the missing bronze "doll" from the sculpture. The city auditor, Larry Munroe, investigated the fate of the sculpture which he valued at $90,000-100,000. Munroe said that all portions had been together until 2008 when they were dispersed and many were lost including the bronze doll which disappeared from city storage, "There has been quite a search but the missing piece has never been found. There is no hope it will be found." The auditor made six recommendations to prevent further loss to the city's art collection including a comprehensive inventory and a deaccessing procedure.

The citizen's committee that had requested the preservation of sculpture hoped that the fragments would be stabilized and returned to display in the North End of Halifax as a continuing memorial to the Halifax Explosion. However, in 2015, the city secretly shipped the remnants of the sculpture to the family of the artist in Montreal. The final fate of the sculpture only emerged in 2018 when questions were asked about the security of the city's art storage in the wake of the removal of the controversial Statue of Edward Cornwallis.

== See also ==
- List of firefighting monuments and memorials
- List of public art in Halifax, Nova Scotia
