= Graham Peacock =

English-born Canadian abstract painter

Graham Peacock (born July 26, 1945) is an English-born abstract Canadian painter. He was a member of the art group founded by Kenworth Moffett (1934–2016) known as the New New Painters.

== Career ==
Peacock was born in London, United Kingdom. From 1962 till 1966, he studied at Goldsmiths, University of London and received his DIP.A.D. in Painting and Sculpture, having been trained by professors who were constructivist sculptors. Then, from 1966 to 1967, he attended the Leeds College of Art, receiving a Post Graduate degree in Painting and Sculpture. In 1967 to 1968 he was hired as a lecturer at Newport College of Art, England, then in 1968 was awarded an Italian Government Scholarship in Painting and took leave from Newport College to work at The British School in Rome as a visiting artist, afterwards working in a private studio in Rome. That summer he lived in New York and travelled throughout Europe visiting academies of fine art and also art collections in London, England, and New York.

From 1969, Peacock was a professor of Fine Art at and then also the Coordinator of the Painting program at the Department of Art and Design, University of Alberta, in Edmonton, Alberta, Canada. In 1971, he was elected Chairman of the Alberta Society of Artists. In 1973, he attended the Michael Steiner workshop at the Emma Lake Artists' Workshops and gained confidence in painting as a career. In 1980, he met Kenworth Moffett who became a consistent supporter of his career. He has been a retired professor emeritus of the university since 2008.

As a painter, Peacock has always experimented with the painting medium. In 1981–1982, he learned how to apply paint wet on wet to make crazed fissures in his work, separations in colour so that one colour is revealed through another. This breakthrough remains the underpinning of his later work. From that date, as he explored his fissures, his paintings grew larger and often irregularly shaped as well as more colorful, earning adjectives such as 'big" and "brave" and many others.

Peacock has had shows of his work nationally and internationally. In 1995 he was given a solo museum exhibition at the Art Gallery of Greater Victoria in Victoria, British Columbia. In 2003, the New New Painting Museum in Toronto organized an exhibition of Peacock's paintings with an accompanying catalogue titled New new illusionism : the recent paintings of Graham Peacock by Kenworth W. Moffett, Lelde Muehlanbachs, the artist, Ken Carpenter, and Marcel Paquet. In 2008 Peacock's work was the subject of a retrospective at the Art Gallery of Alberta and an accompanying catalogue was published. In 2024, he had a show with Gordon Rayner at James Rottman Fine Art Gallery in Toronto titled Invention/Illusion which can be seen on YouTube.
