= Joseph Drapell =

Czech-Canadian painter (born 1940)

- Born: March 13, 1940; Humpolec, Czechoslovakia
- Education: Cranbrook Academy of Art in Bloomfield Hills, Michigan (1968-1970)
- Known for: painter

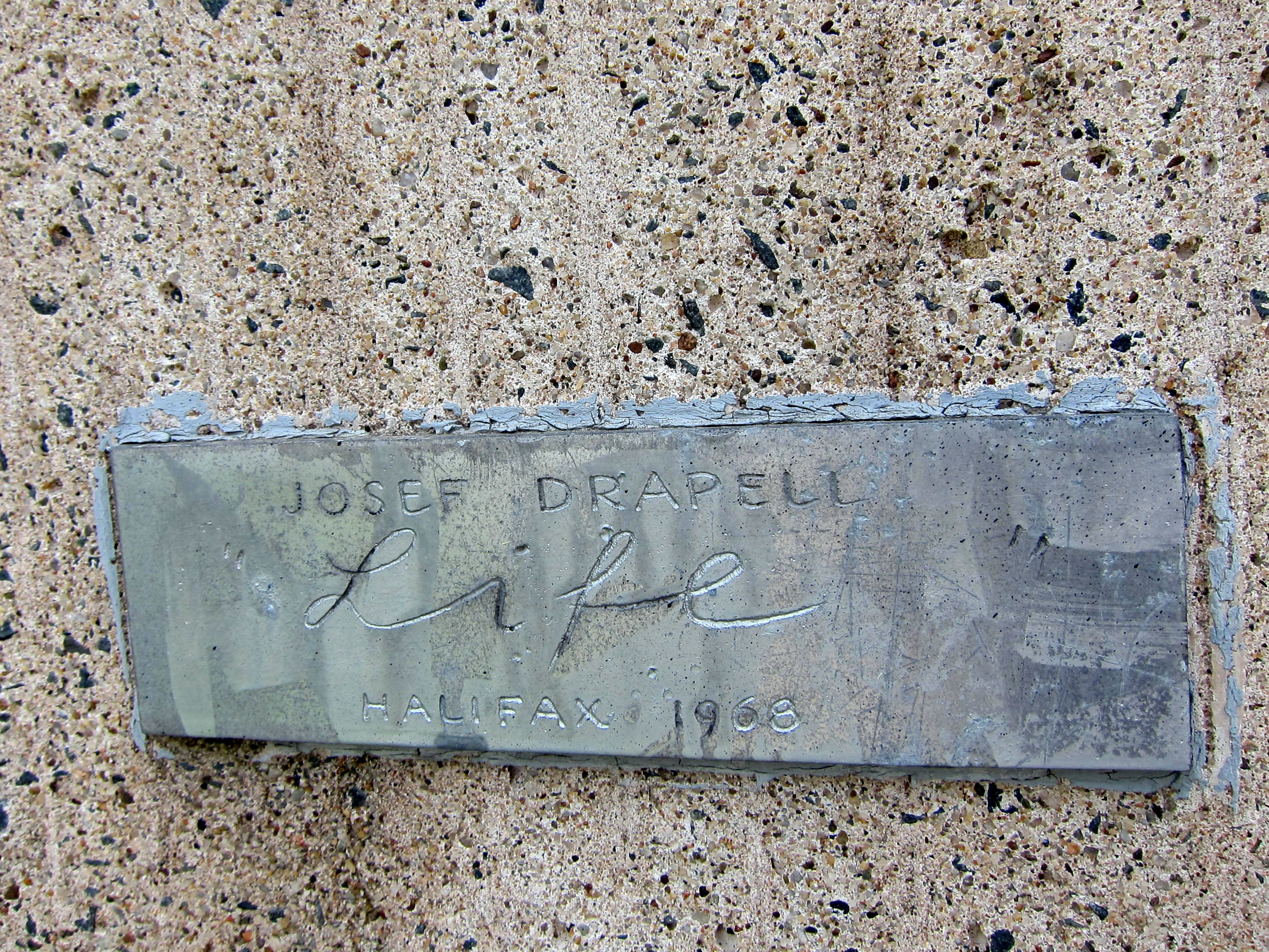
Nameplate on Life, a 1968 sculpture on Quinpool Road in Halifax, Nova Scotia

Joseph Drapell RCA (born March 13, 1940) is a Czech-Canadian abstract painter.

== Early life ==
Drapell was born in Humpolec, Czechoslovakia, and emigrated to Canada in 1966. From 1968 to 1970 he studied at the Cranbrook Academy of Art in Bloomfield Hills, Michigan. At the Cranbrook Academy he met visiting Canadian artist Jack Bush and the American art critic Clement Greenberg. Bush influenced his work by telling him to pay more attention to intuition. He moved permanently to Toronto in 1970 and during the period from 1972 through 1974 developed a technique of applying paint with a broad spreading device attached to a movable support. Drapell was also influenced by the American painter Morris Louis.

== Career ==
Drapell began his formal career as an artist at age twenty-eight and has since participated in numerous exhibitions. In 1968, he designed and created a public sculpture titled Life in Halifax.

A Czech-Canadian artist, Drapell belongs to a generation following the Painters Eleven and Washington Color School. He is a founding member of the New New Painters, a group that has exhibited internationally since the 1990s. The NNP consists primarily of American artists but includes two Canadians: Drapell and Graham Peacock. In 1998, Drapell and his wife, poet Anna Maclachlan, established the Museum of New, dedicated to showcasing New New art. One critic has described Drapell's work as meretricious and impure, yet acknowledged his ability to create striking effects, often inspired by time spent at his island retreat in Georgian Bay (1971-2021).

Drapell is also a member of the Royal Canadian Academy of Arts.
