= Fallen Paramedics Memorial =

Memorial in Victoria, British Columbia

Coordinates: 48.4186°N 123.3701°W

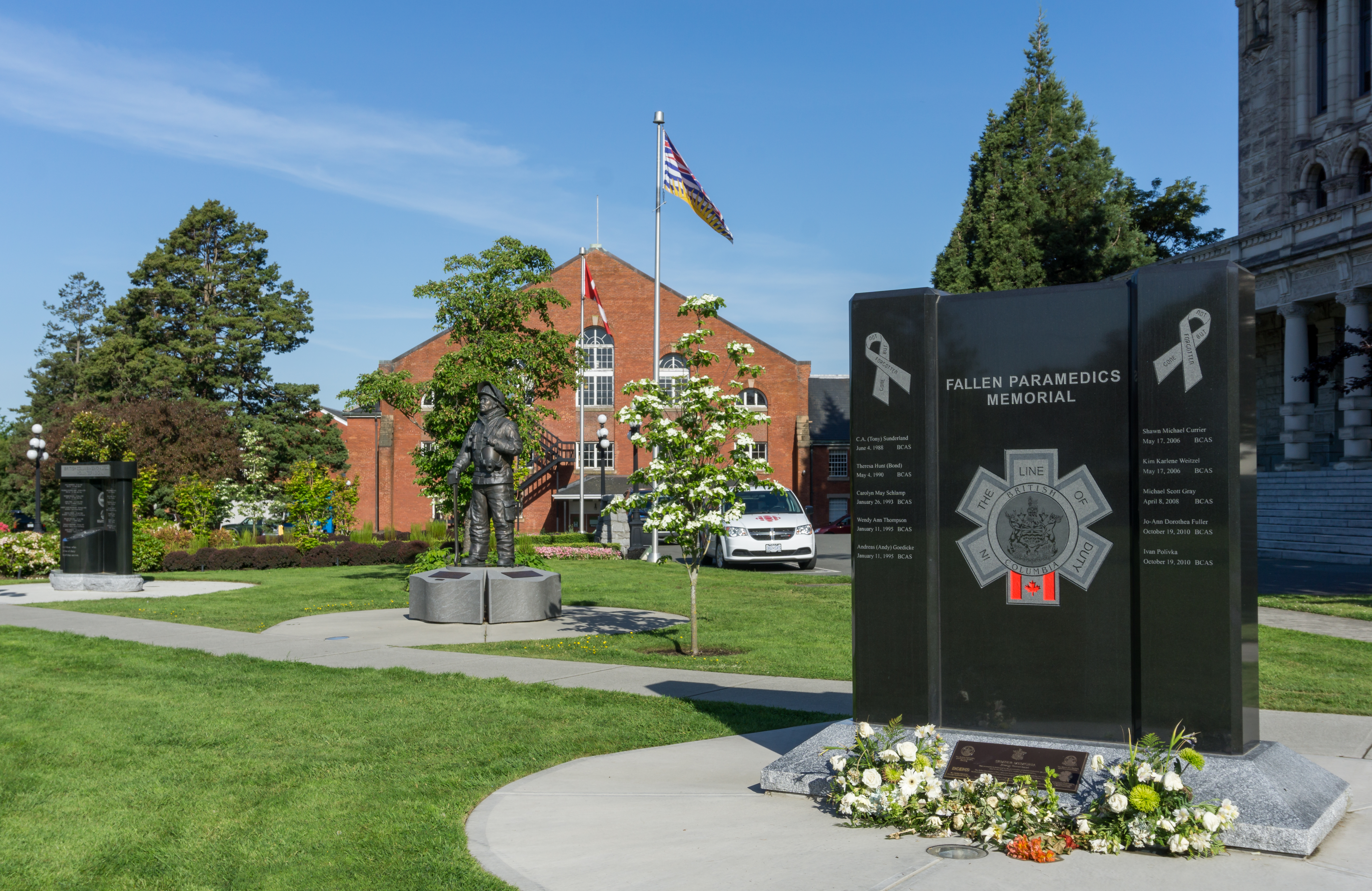
- The memorial in 2018
- Interactive map of Fallen Paramedics Memorial
- Location: Victoria, British Columbia, Canada

The Fallen Paramedics Memorial is a monument commemorating paramedics who have died in the line of duty, installed in Victoria, British Columbia. The memorial was unveiled on May 6, 2015. It is located in the BC Emergency Services Garden of Honour, south of the Legislative Buildings.
