= British Columbia Law Enforcement Memorial =

Memorial in Victoria, British Columbia

Coordinates: 48.4187°N 123.3699°W

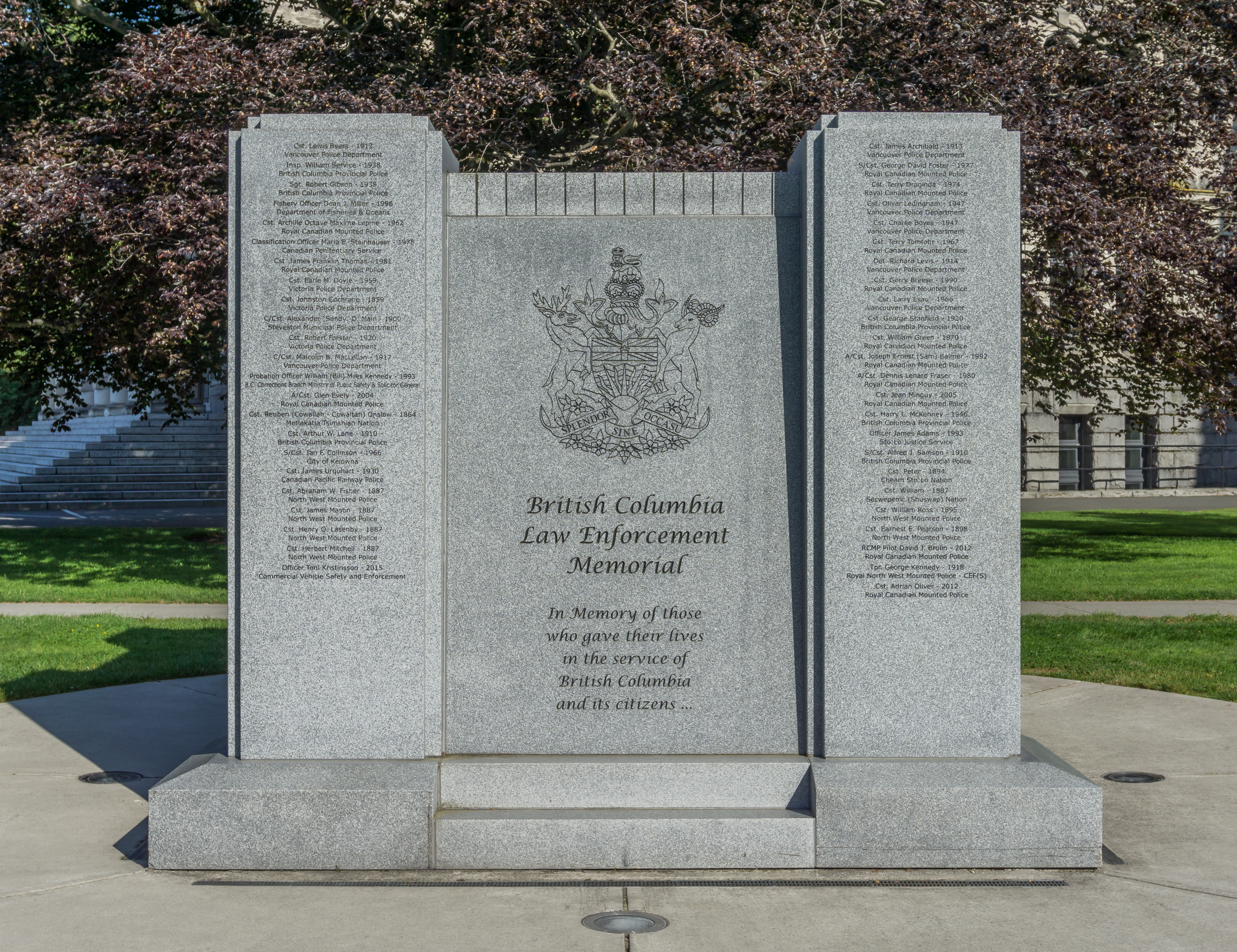
- The memorial in 2018
- Location: Victoria, British Columbia, Canada
- Opening date: 26 September 2004

The British Columbia Law Enforcement Memorial is a memorial commemorating law enforcement professionals who died in the line of duty, in Victoria, British Columbia, Canada.

It was unveiled by then-Premier of British Columbia Gordon Campbell on 26 September 2004, and sits in the grounds of the British Columbia Parliament Buildings.
