= Front Fountain =

Fountain in Victoria, British Columbia

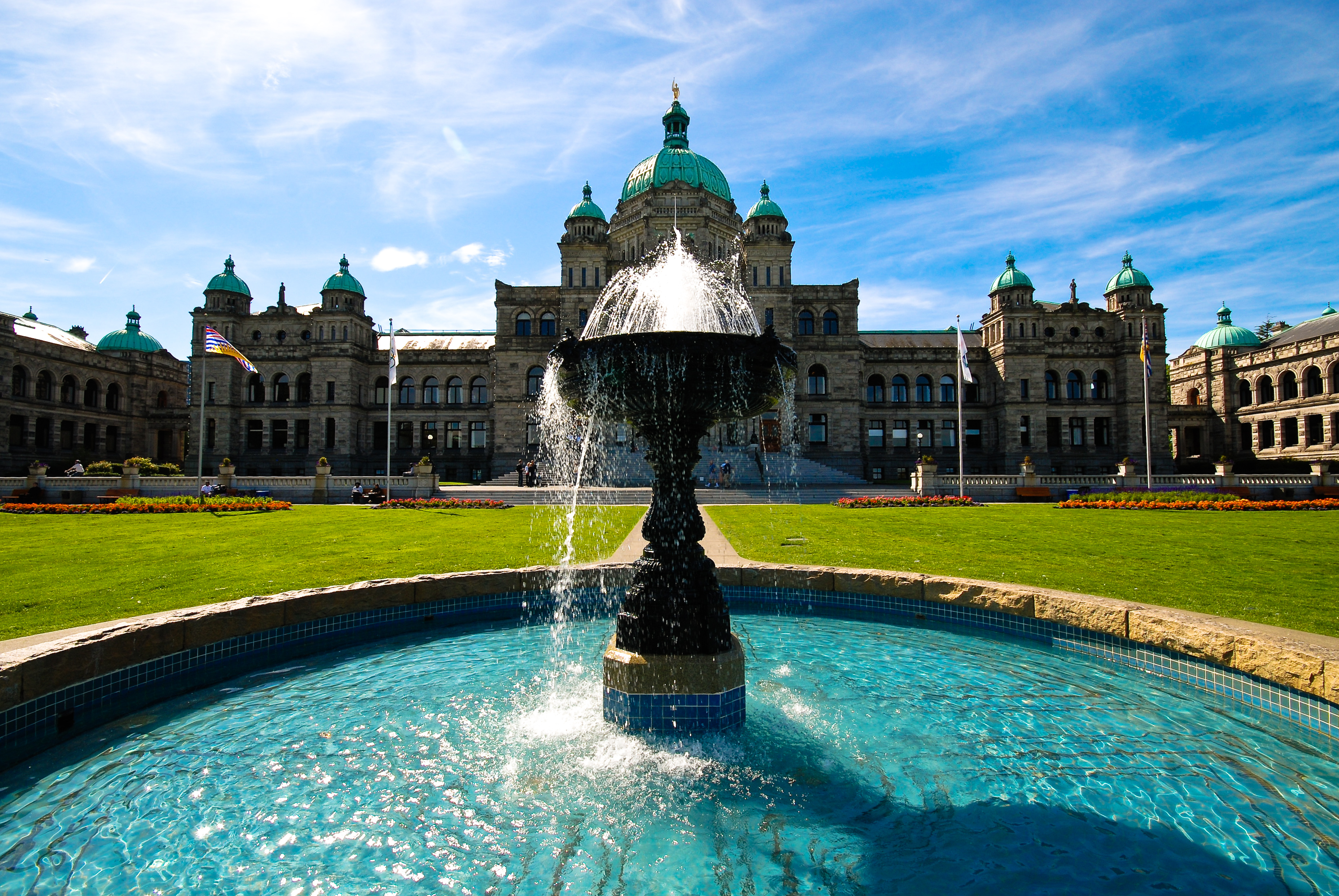
- The fountain in 2008
- Year: 1906
- Location: Victoria, British Columbia, Canada
- 48.42016°N 123.37006°W

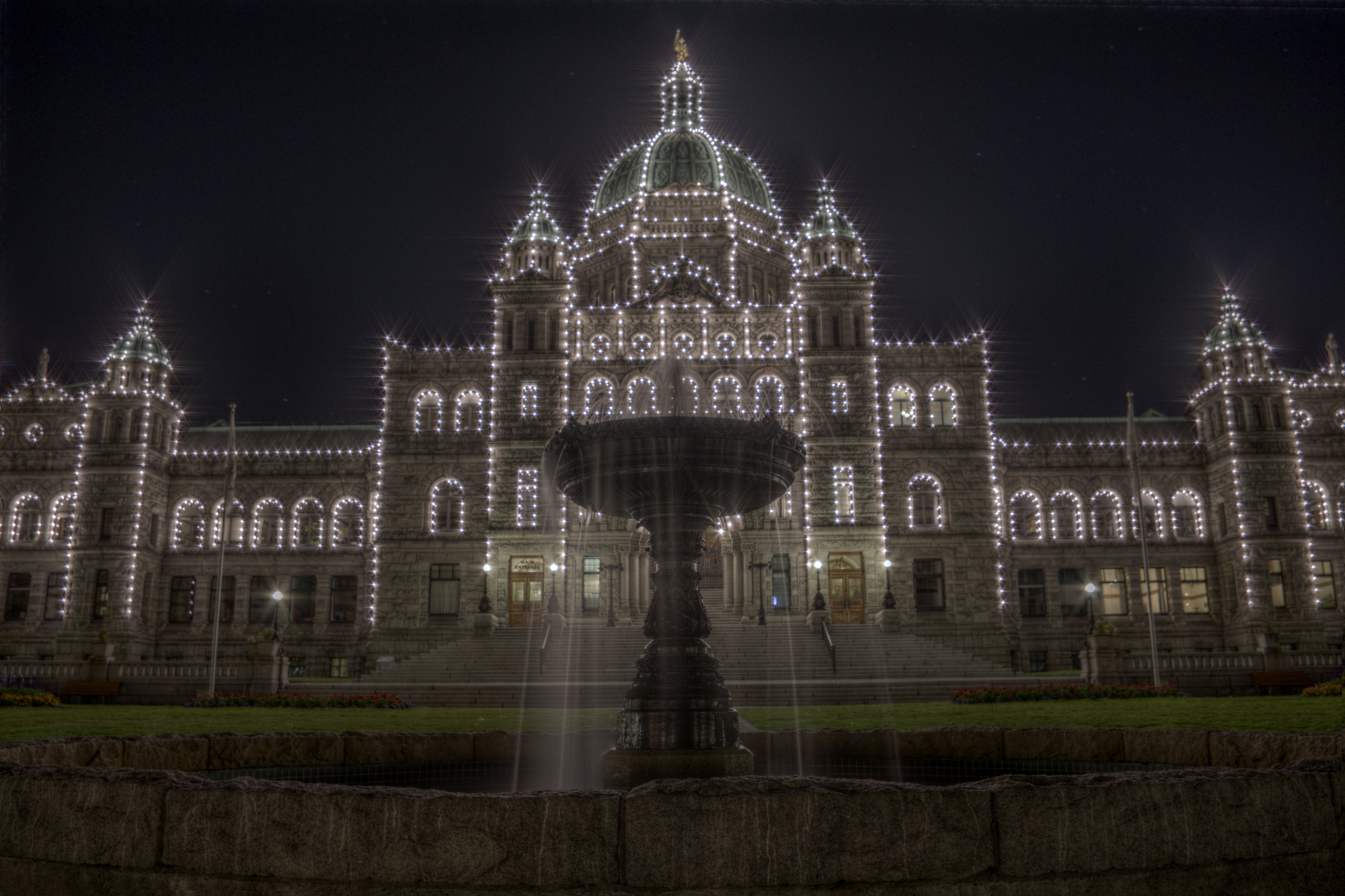
The fountain at night, 2009

Front Fountain is a fountain designed by Hooper & Watkins, installed outside the British Columbia Parliament Buildings, in Victoria, British Columbia. It was manufactured in 1905, by Joseph W. Fiske in New York, and installed in 1906. The fountain has one large ceramic tile basin with a granite rim. It once had four basins.
