= Jordi Bonet =

Canadian artist

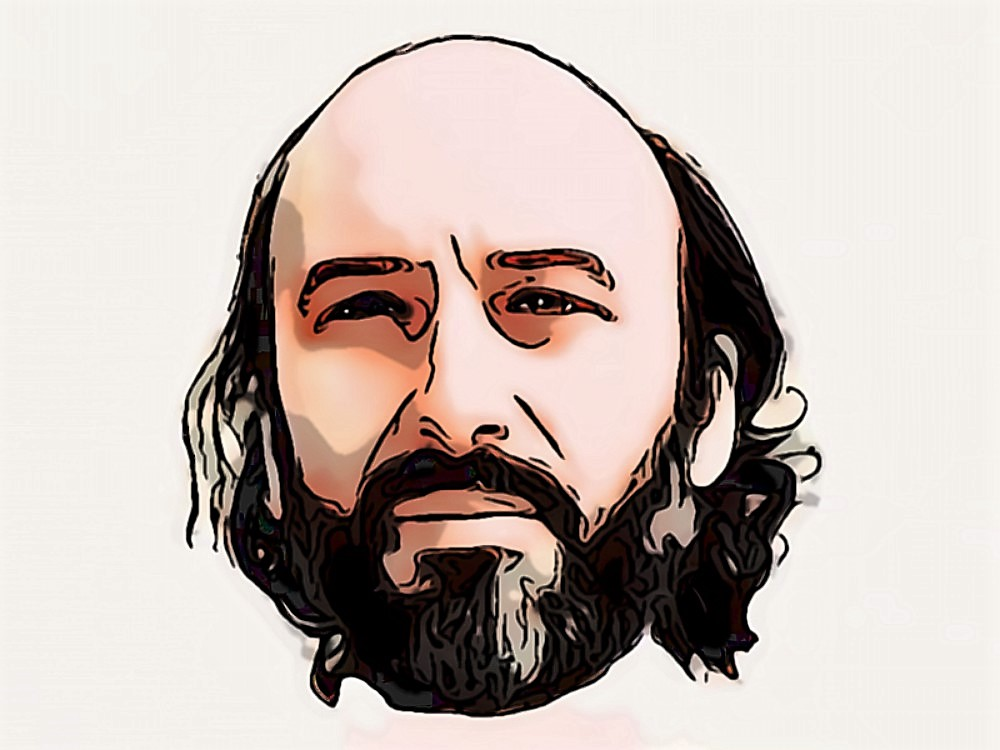
- Born: May 7, 1932; Barcelona, Catalonia, Spain
- Died: December 25, 1979 (aged 47); Mont-Saint-Hilaire, Quebec, Canada
- Known for: painter, ceramic artist, muralist, and sculptor.

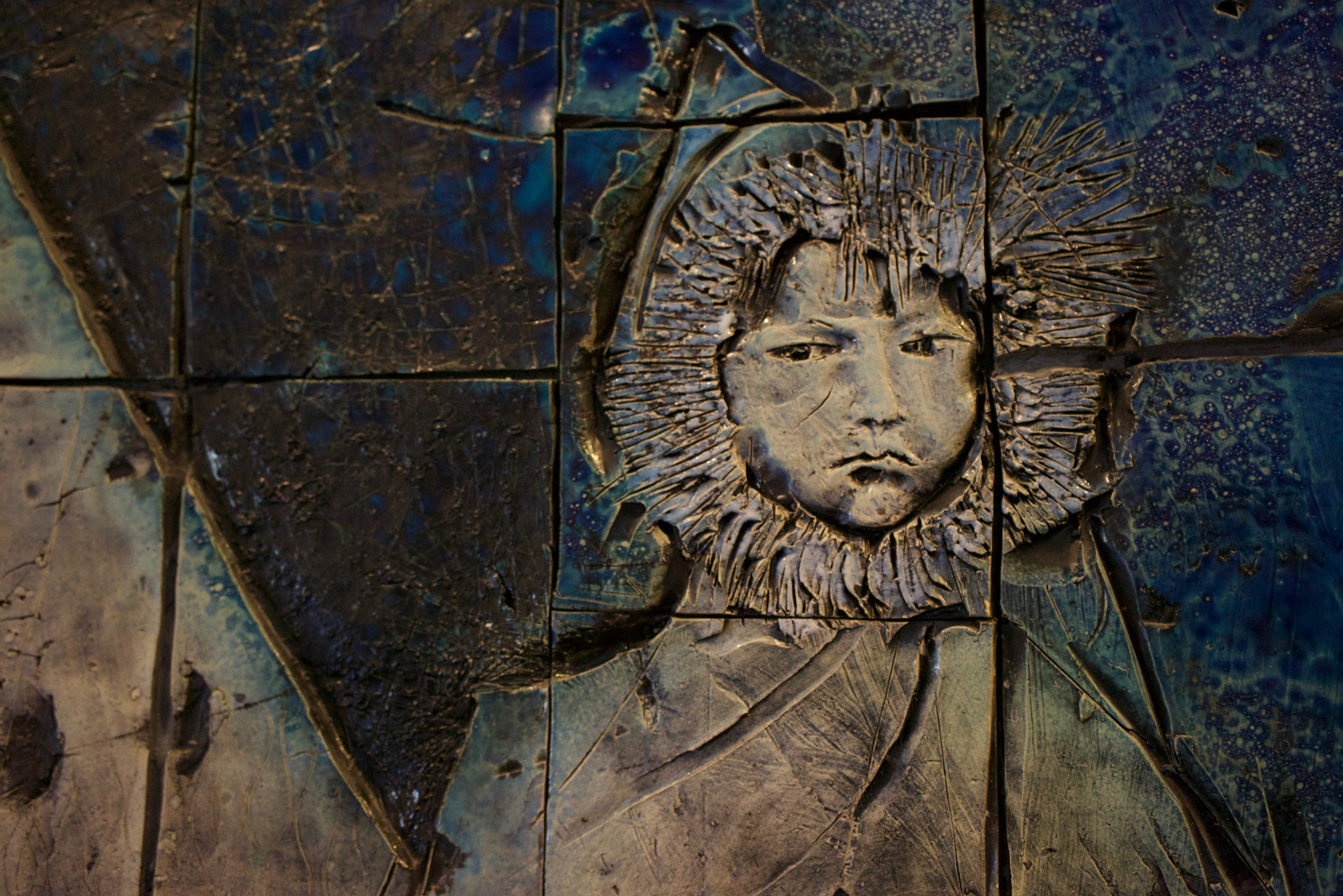
The Jordi Bonet Murals in the rotunda of the Charles S. Curtis Memorial Hospital in St. Anthony Newfoundland were created and fabricated in 1967

Jordi Bonet, known professionally as Jordi Bonet RCA (7 May 1932 – 25 December 1979), was a Spanish-born Canadian painter, ceramist, muralist, and sculptor who worked principally in Quebec.

== Life and work ==
Born in Barcelona, Spain of Catalan origin, he lost his right arm at the age of 9. His childhood would be marked by the Spanish Civil War. He studied art in Barcelona. He began working in paint and ceramic before expanding his focus to include metal and concrete reliefs.

He emigrated to Canada in 1954, establishing himself in Quebec, where he continued his studies. After briefly returning to Spain, he established an atelier in Mont-Saint-Hilaire in 1960. Over the next 20 years, he created more than 100 works in Quebec and abroad, and associated with major art figures such as Salvador Dalí.

In 1964, he was commissioned by the Government of Sierra Leone to deliver the mural which can still be seen at the front of the Bank of Sierra Leone building, in the capital, Freetown. His signature is situated at the bottom right-hand of the mural, with the words "Jordi Bonet '64".

In 1967, Jordi Bonet created The Inuit Family, a rotunda that represents life in northern Newfoundland and Labrador, the work is located inside the main entrance of the Charles S. Curtis Memorial Hospital, Saint Anthony, Canada.

His relief in the Grand Théâtre de Québec created a scandal in 1971 because of the line "Vous êtes pas écœurés de mourir bande de caves? C'est assez !" ("Aren't you sick of dying, you gang of idiots? Enough!") incorporated into it, a quotation from the poet Claude Péloquin. Among his other major works are the relief L'homme devant la science on the west facade of the Pavillon Adrien-Pouliot of Université Laval in Quebec, 'Citius, Altius, Fortius in the Montreal Metro station Pie-IX; Hommage à Gaudí, a cycle of wall sculptures in Place des Arts in Montreal; the Halifax Explosion Memorial Sculpture; and a set of stained-glass windows and sculptures in Our Lady of the Skies Chapel at John F. Kennedy International Airport in New York City. He was particularly interested in sacred works, creating artworks and liturgical objects for churches and convents in Quebec, Ontario, and elsewhere. Galerie L'Art français exhibited his works from the 1950s.

He was one of Quebec's established artists when he died of leukemia at the age of 47.

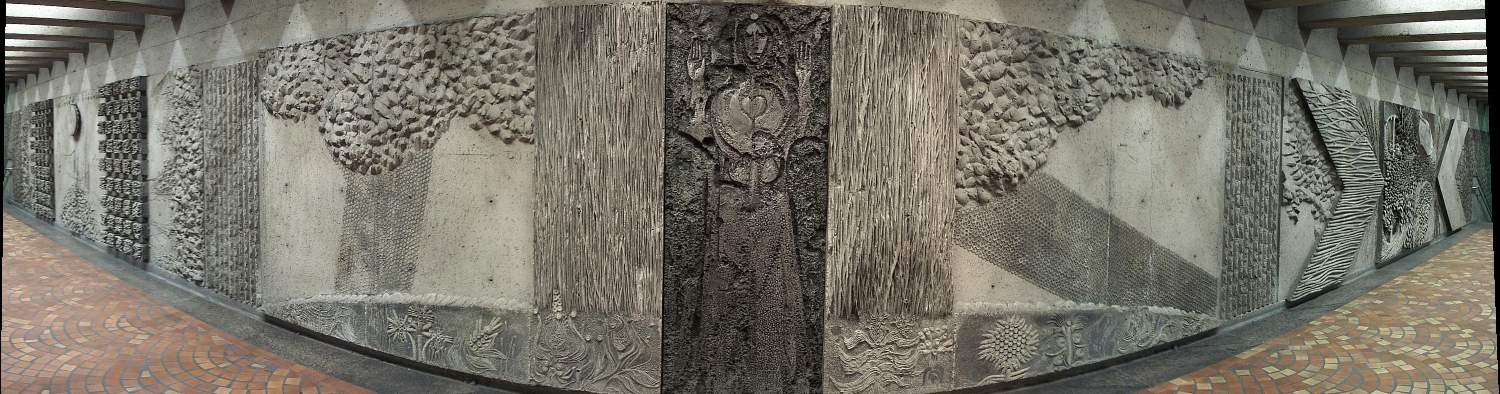
Jordi Bonet's Citius, Altius, Fortius which is Latin for Faster, Higher, Stronger at Pie-IX metro station in Montreal, Quebec

== Honours ==
- Royal Canadian Academy of Arts

== Photos ==
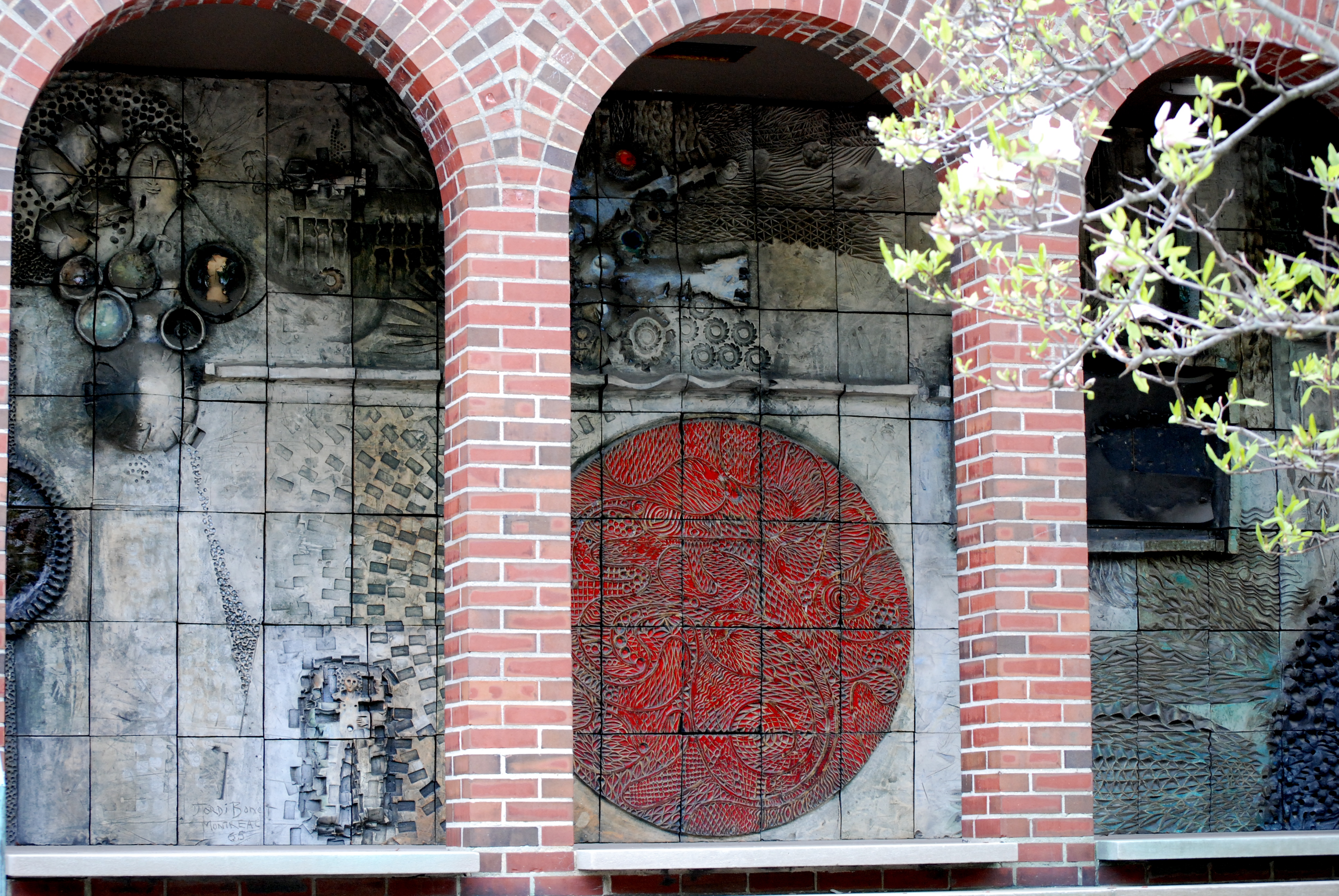
Relief sculpture at Sonia Shankman Orthogenic School on the campus of and affiliated with the University of Chicago

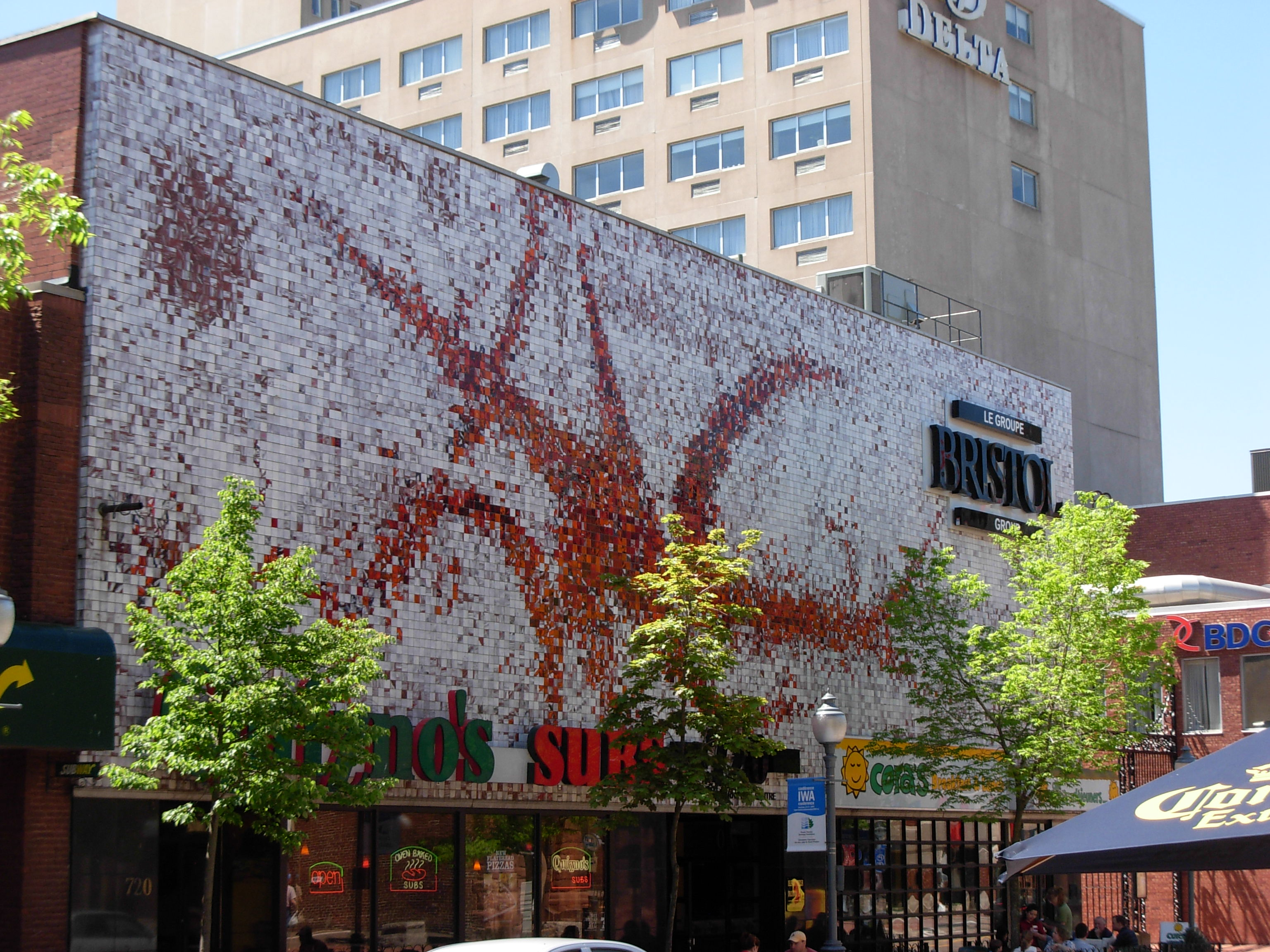
Mosaic in Moncton, New Brunswick

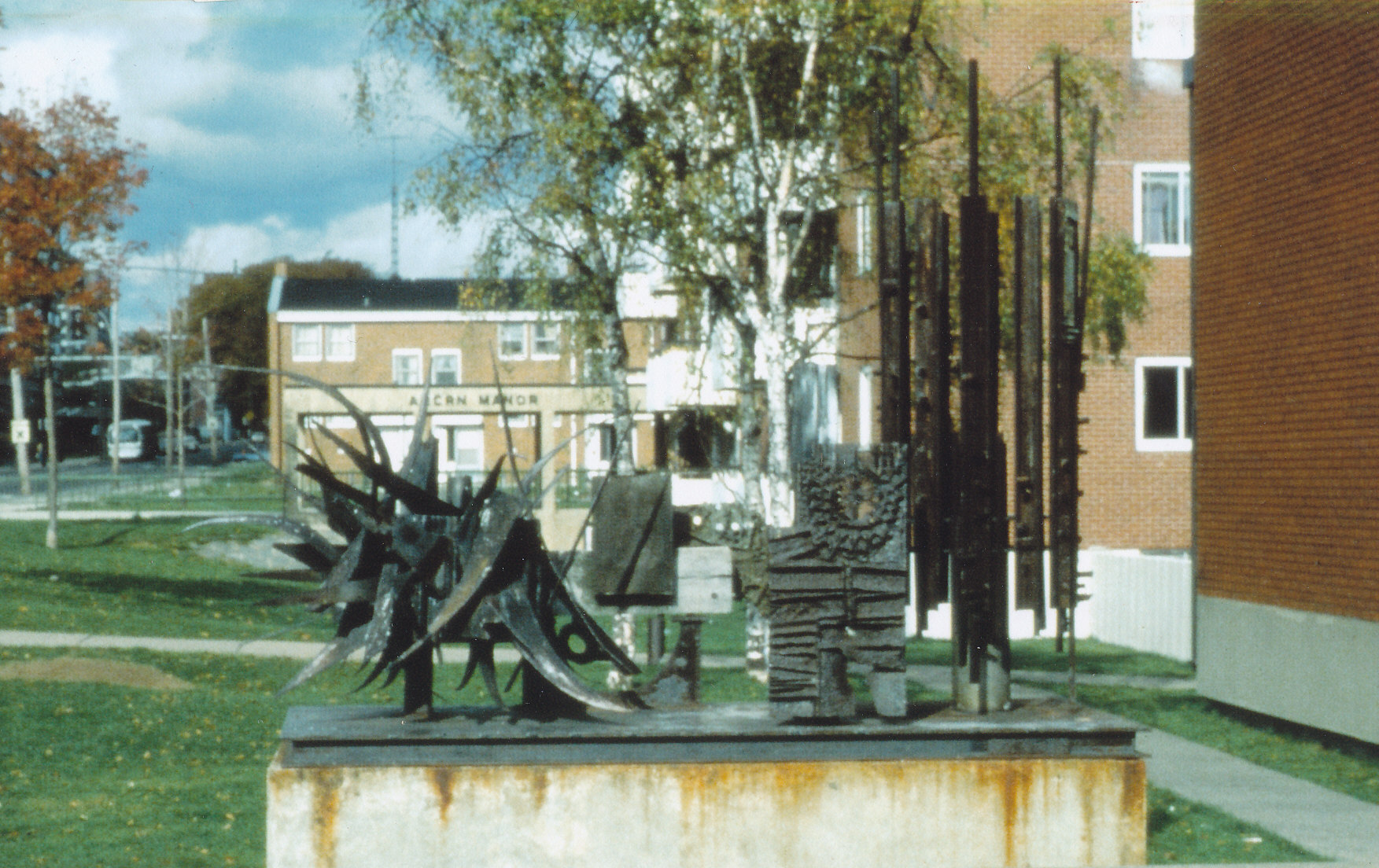
Halifax Explosion Memorial Sculpture in Halifax, Nova Scotia

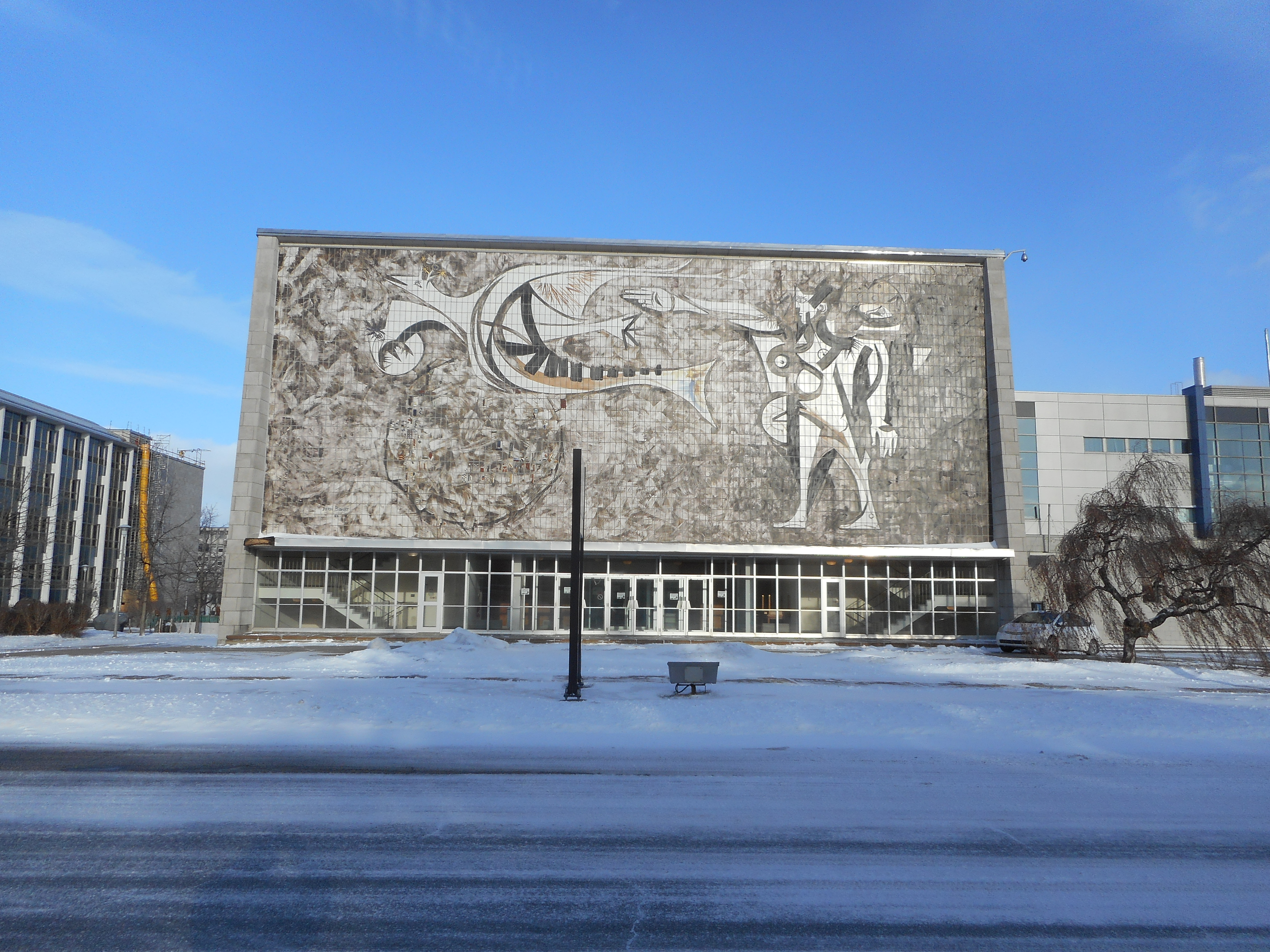
Mural on the Adrien-Pouliot Building of Laval University, Quebec City

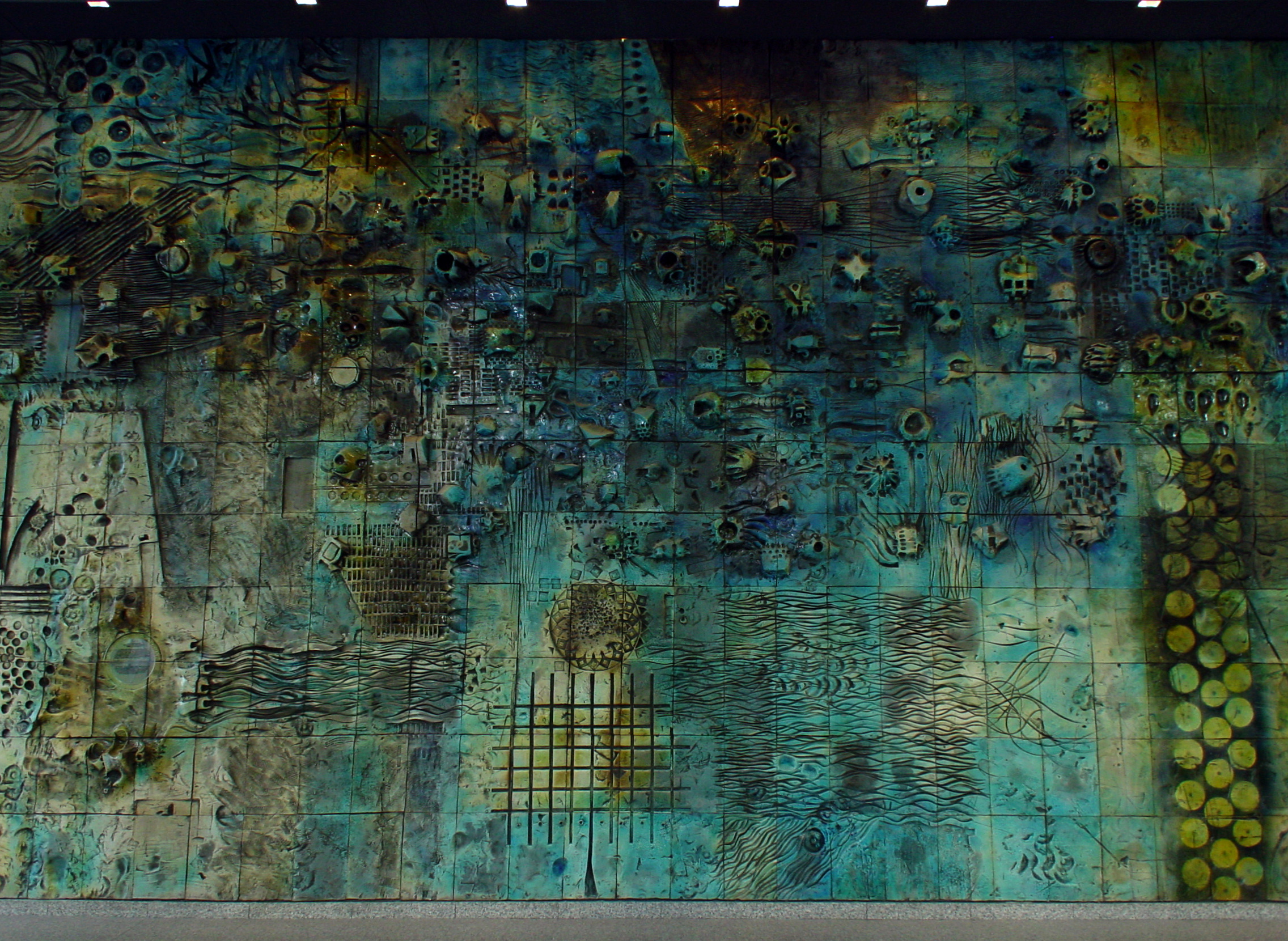
Resurgence (1977), in the lobby of the Oceanic Tower in Vancouver

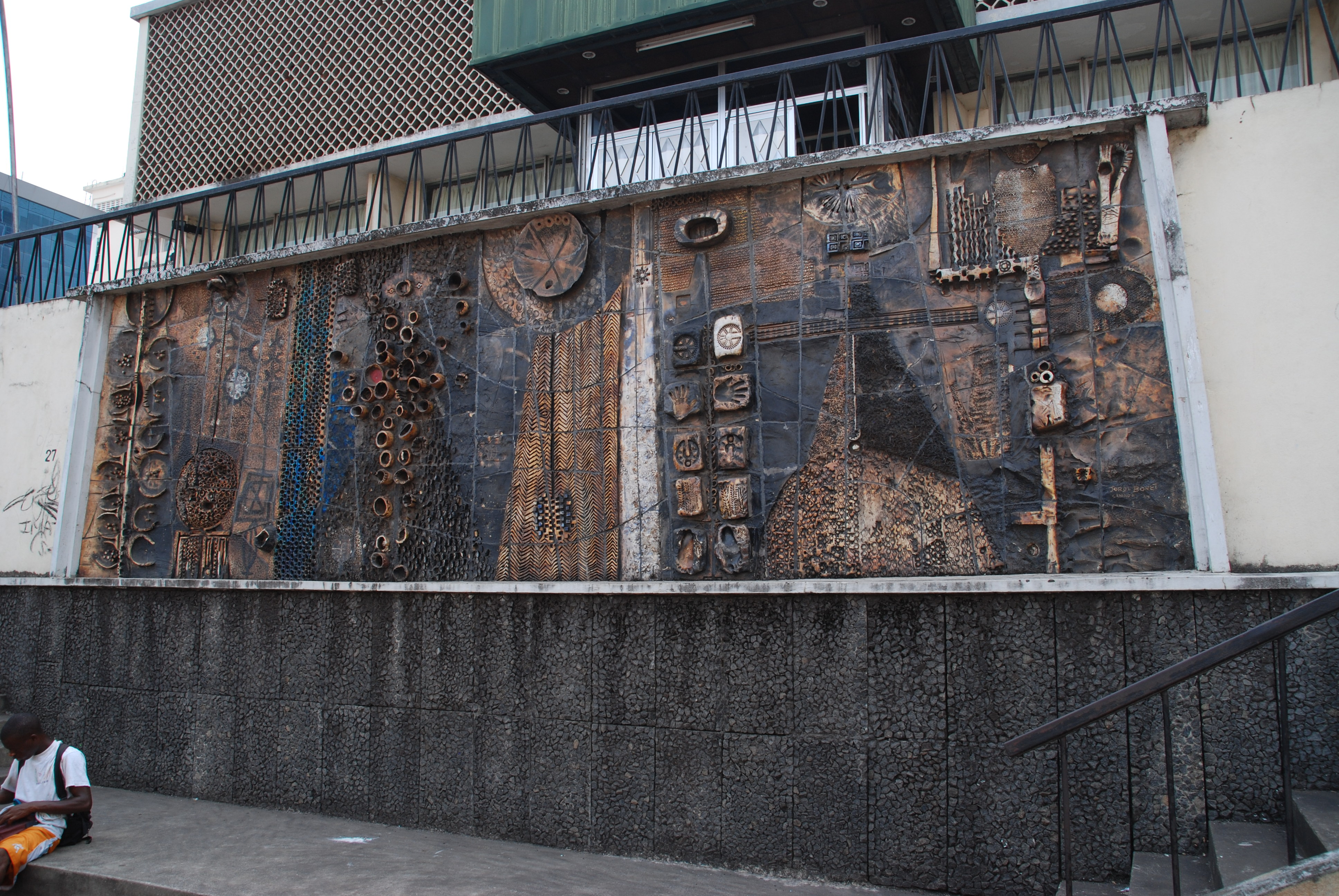
Mural on the front of The Bank of Sierra Leone building in Freetown

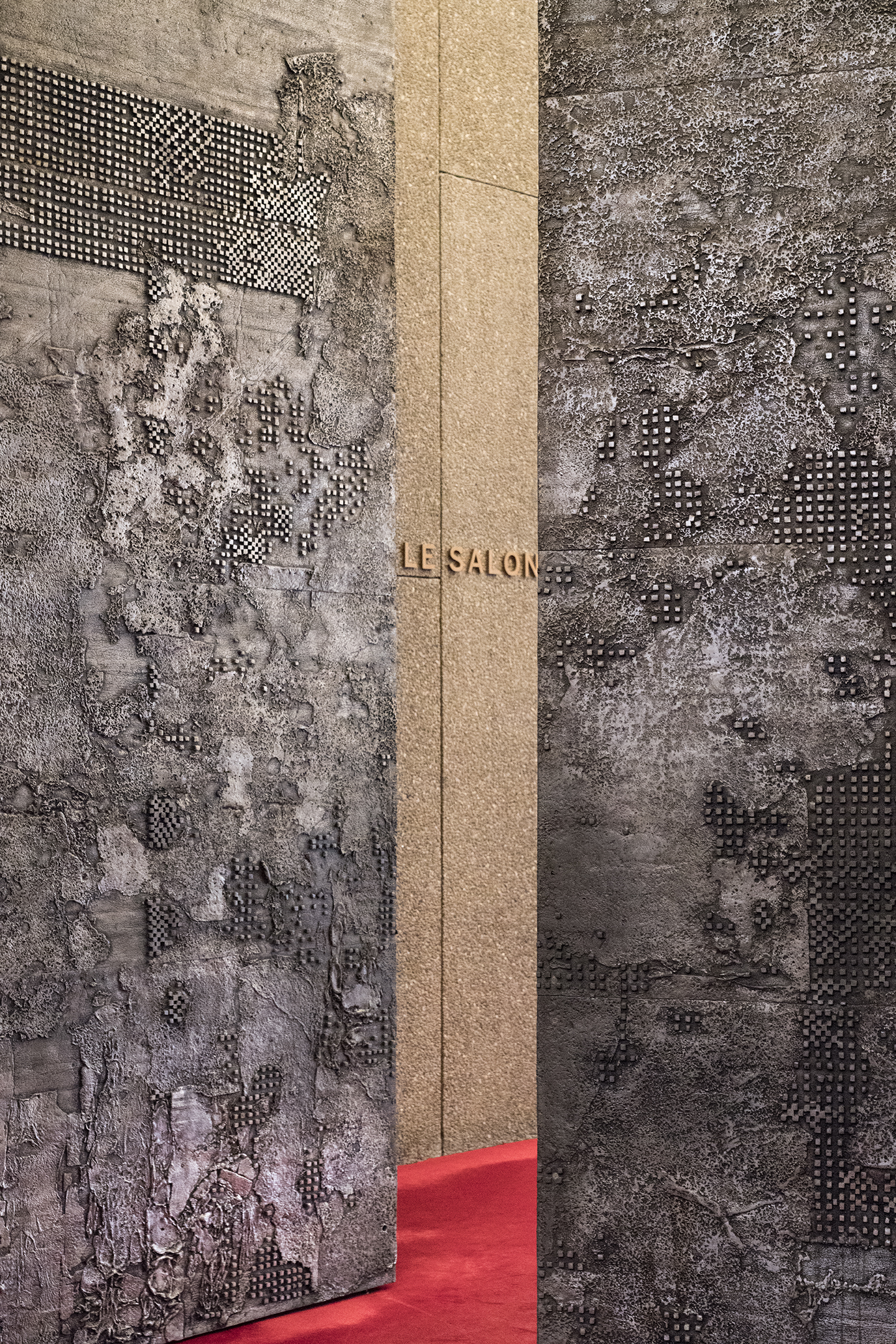
Detail view of an untitled relief, National Arts Centre, Ottawa
The Inuit Family 1967: Mural on the rotunda of Curtis Memorial Hospital, St-Anthony, Canada

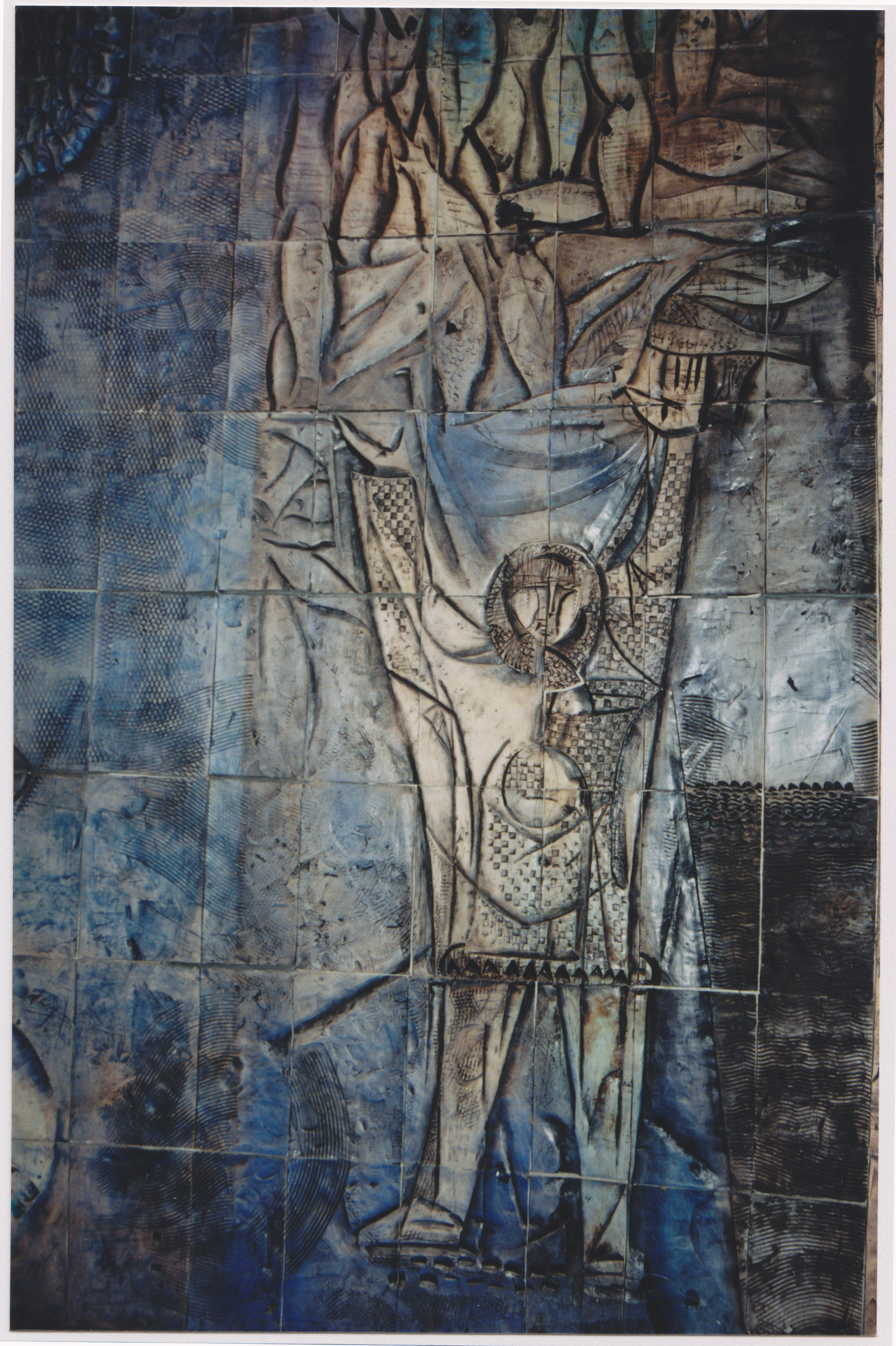
Fishing - With his arms outstretched to the sky, a Newfoundland fisherman salutes the abundance of cod.

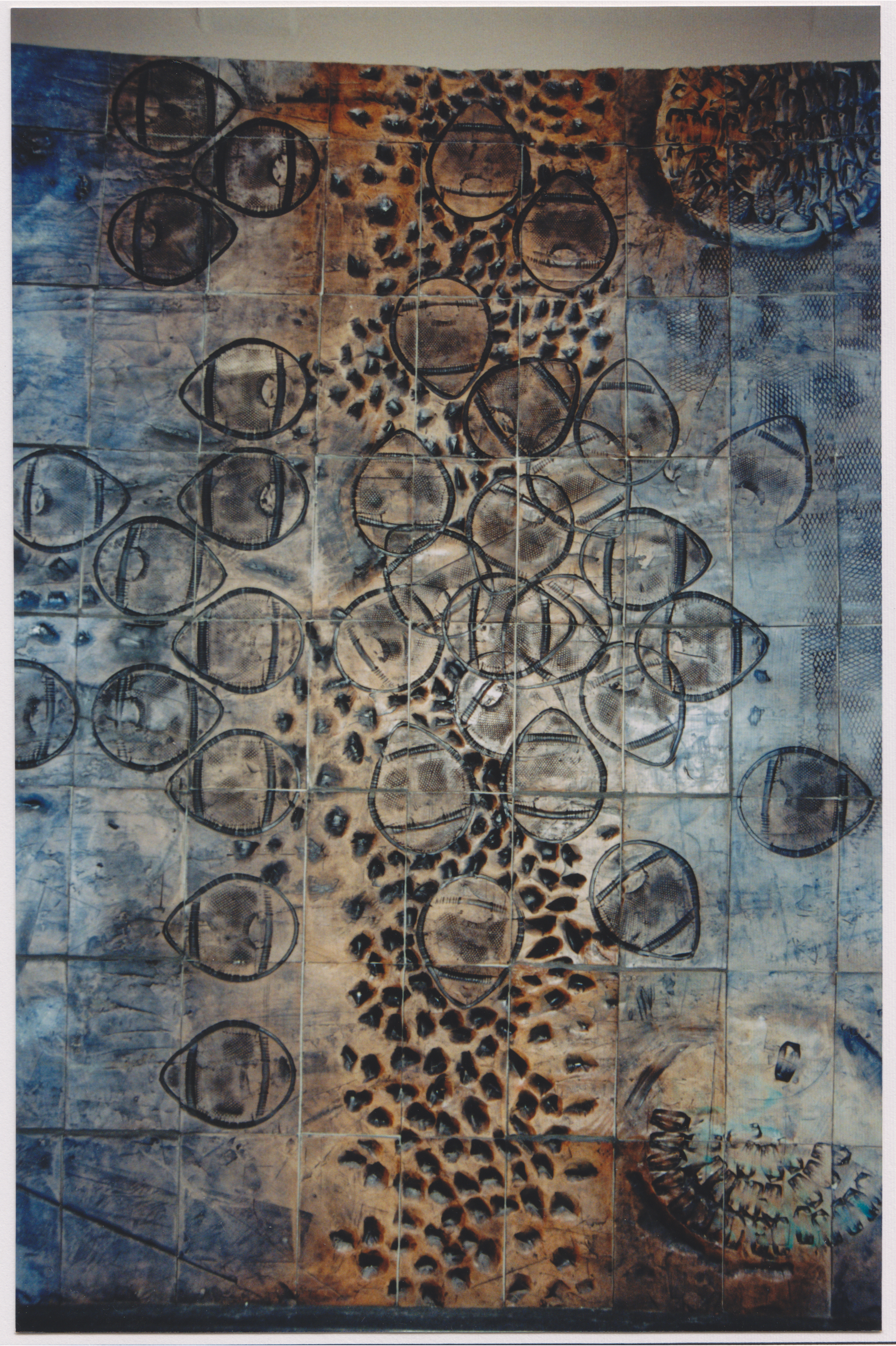
Hunting: Snowshoe trails run along a devastation of animals, they represent hunting and trapping in Labrador

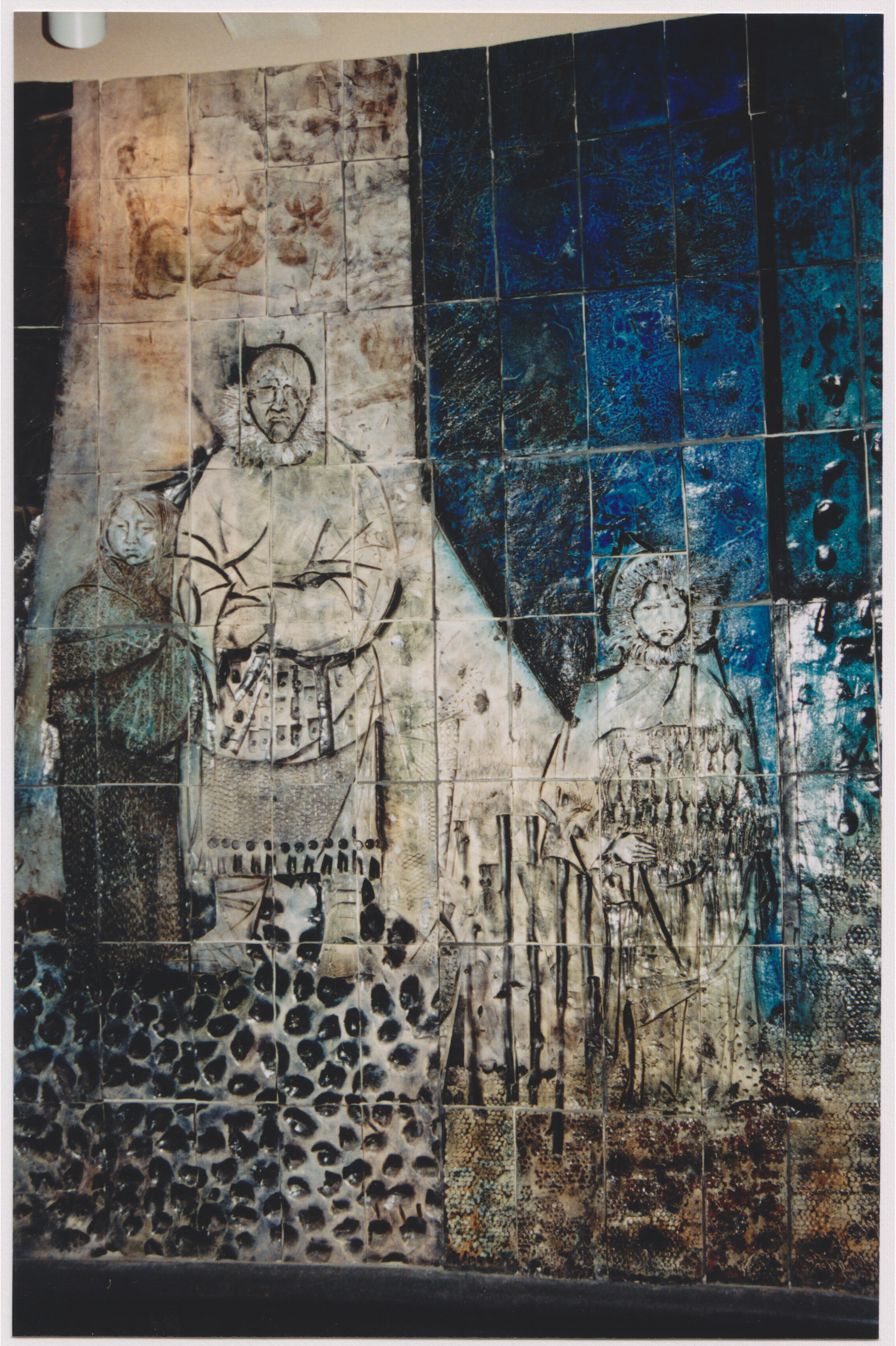
Woman, man and son stand in front of the opening of their tent

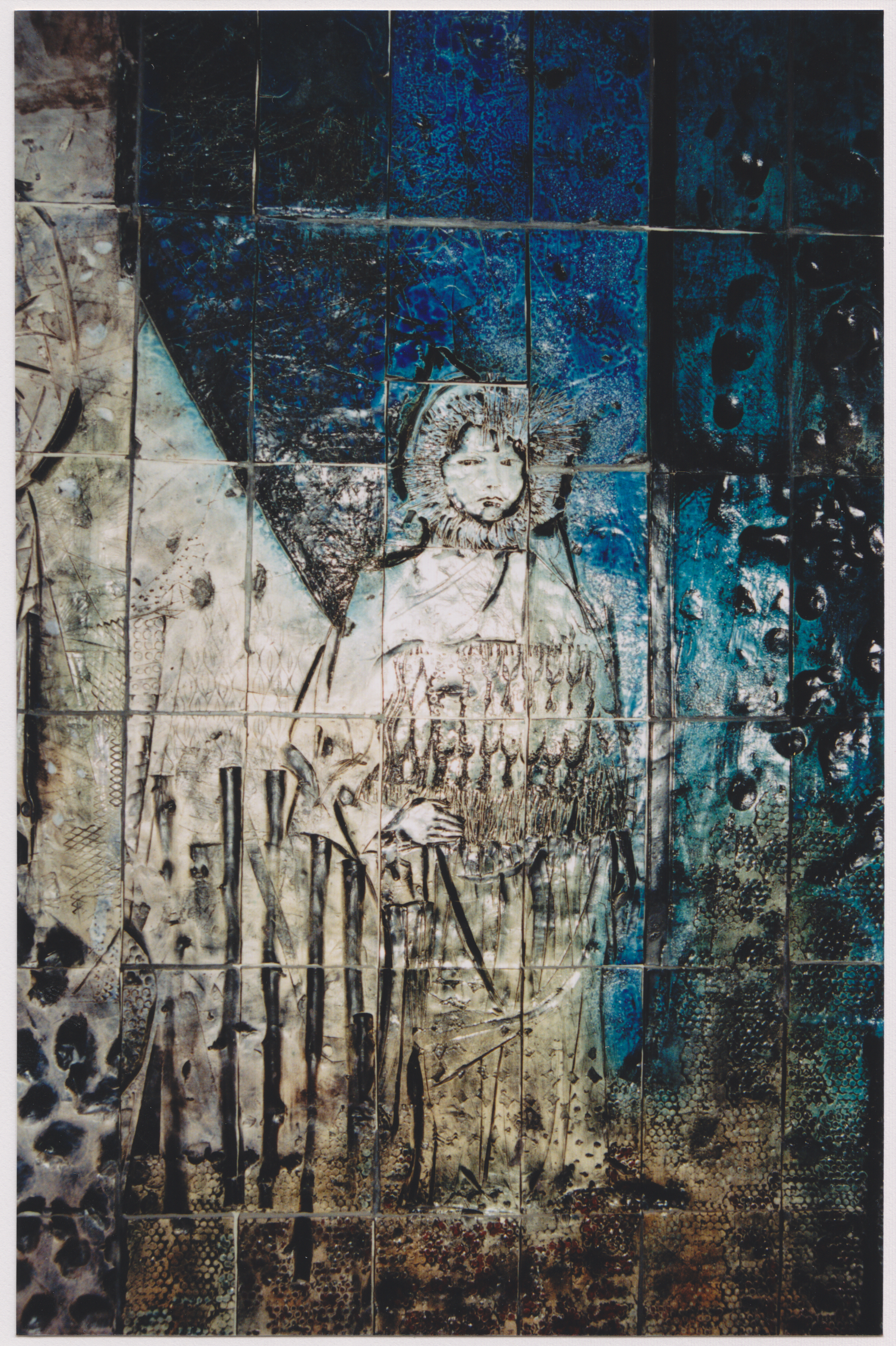
The boy's expressive face suggests that he is a portrait

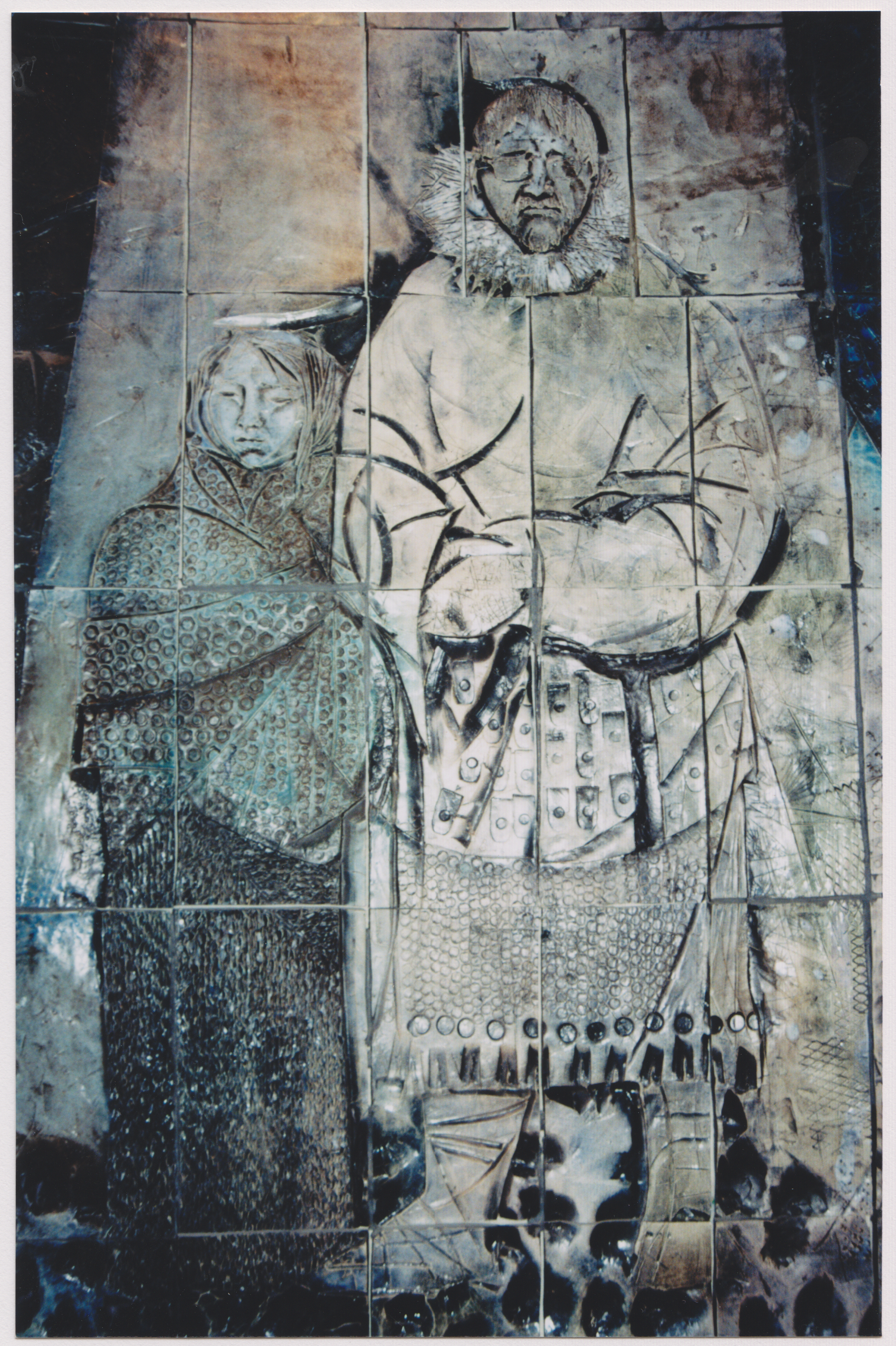
These people wear traditional clothing

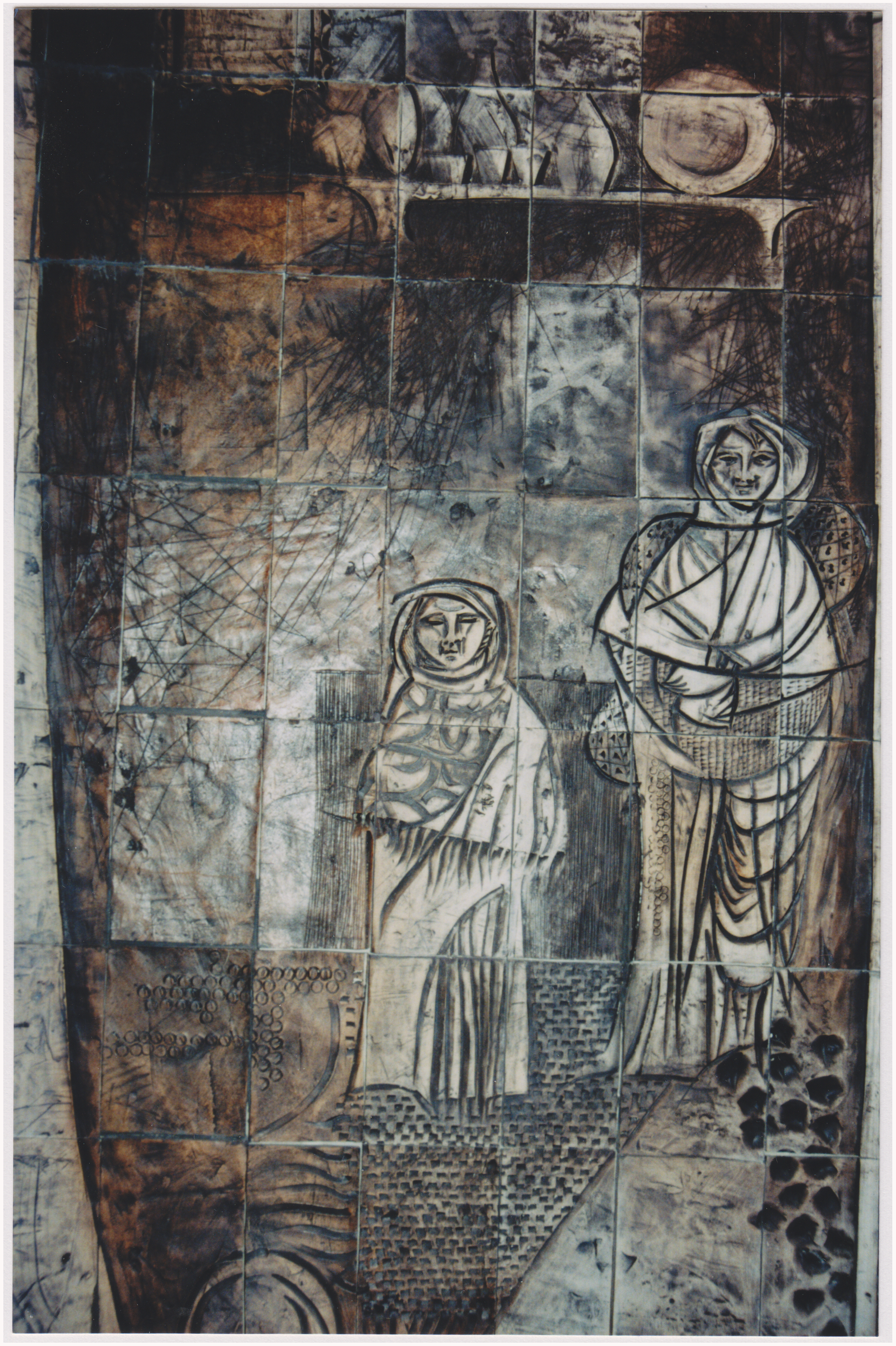
The Indians: snowshoes on backs, two Women walk on a path, like in a cabin, we see kitchen utensils and a mirror

== See also ==
- List of Canadian artists
- Jordi-Bonet Bridge linking Mont-Saint-Hilaire and Belœil (french)
- Jordi-Bonet bridge, toponymy, origin and meaning (french), Montérégie
