= Leon Berkowitz =

American artist, painter (1911–1987)

- Born: September 14, 1911; Philadelphia, Pennsylvania, U.S.
- Died: August 17, 1987 (aged 75); Washington, D.C., U.S.
- Education: University of Pennsylvania, Art Students League of New York, Corcoran College of Art and Design, Académie de la Grande Chaumière
- Movement: Washington Color School
- Spouses: Ida Fox (m. 1935; died 1979), Maureen Berkowitz

Leon Berkowitz (14 September 1911 – 17 August 1987) was an American artist and educator. He is best known for his color field paintings and the series, The Unities. He co-founded the Washington Workshop Center, a gallery and school.

Berkowitz was a leading member of the art movement, the Washington Color School. Berkowitz did not like the label of, "Washington Color School" and often rejected it for his own work.

== Biography ==
Window No. 4 (1986) at the Walter E. Washington Convention Center in Washington, DC in 2022

Leon Berkowitz was born on 14 September 1911 in Philadelphia, Pennsylvania, to parents Yettie (née Pries) and Bernard Berkowitz. His parents were Hasidic, from Hungary. His date of birth sometimes has a different listed date (including 1915, 1919), and his place of birth has also been listed as nearby Trenton Township. Between 1935 and 1937, he married poet Ida Fox.

He attended the University of Pennsylvania, the Art Students League of New York (1941), the Corcoran College of Art and Design, and the Académie de la Grande Chaumière. During World War II between 1943 and 1945, Berkowitz served in the United States Army and was stationed in Virginia.

After his service he moved to Washington D.C. and co-founded the Washington Workshop Center (also known as the Workshop Art Center or Washington Workshop Center for the Arts) alongside his wife Ida Fox Berkowitz and artist Helmut Kern. The workshop offered classes, workspace, and a gallery. The center became a key gathering place for the Washington Color School artists, including Morris Louis, Kenneth Noland, Howard Mehring, Thomas Downing, and Gene Davis. One of Berkowitz' students at the workshop was Scott Burton.

His paintings were abstract, and softly radiated colors and tones that one might found in nature.

== Death and legacy ==
Berkowitz died on 17 August 1987. His work can be found in public collections, including at Smithsonian American Art Museum, Des Moines Art Center, National Gallery of Art, Corcoran Gallery of Art, John and Mable Ringling Museum of Art, the Phillips Collection, Museum of Modern Art, the Aldrich Museum of Contemporary Art, the Wadsworth Atheneum, the High Museum of Art, and the Kalamazoo Institute of Arts.

Berkowitz' work was featured in the postmortem exhibition, Hard and Soft (2002) at ACA Galleries in New York City. His work was in the exhibit, Painting the Picture (2018–2019), at Museum of Contemporary Art Jacksonville.
