= Washington Color School =

20th century American art movement

- Washington, D.C., Color School
- Formation: c. 1950s
- Headquarters: Washington, D.C., United States
- Leader: Morris Louis, Kenneth Noland

The Washington Color School, was an art movement starting during the 1950s–1970s in Washington, D.C., in the United States, built of abstract expressionist artists. The movement emerged during a time when society, the arts, and people were changing quickly. The founders of this movement are Morris Louis and Kenneth Noland, however four more artists were part of the initial art exhibition in 1965.

== Overview ==
The Washington Color School, a visual art movement, describes a form of image making concerned primarily with color field painting, a form of non-objective or non-representational art that explored ways to use large solid areas of paint.

The Washington Color School artists painted largely non-representational works, and were central to the larger color field movement. Though not generally considered abstract expressionists due to the orderliness of their works and differing motivating philosophies, many parallels can be drawn between the Washington Color School and the abstract expressionists. Minimally, the use of stripes, washes, and fields of single colors of paint on canvas were common to most artists in both groups. A common technique used in the Washington Color School was "soak staining" or just "staining", in which the artist would pour a thinned painting medium onto canvas and let it sit over time. The result would be a stain in the canvas with no visible traces of conventional application, such as brush strokes.

== History ==
=== Greenberg, Louis and Noland ===
In 1954, art critic Clement Greenberg introduced Morris Louis to painter Helen Frankenthaler, who was working in as a, "proto–color field painter". Her painting, Mountains and Sea (1952) had an impact on Louis and many other painters in Washington, D.C., and they borrowed Frankenthaler's process of staining raw canvas with color.

In 1960, Clement Greenberg wrote in Art International magazine about the two local Washington, D.C., artists, Morris Louis and Kenneth Noland. In his writing he labeled them as "color painters".

=== Washington Workshop Center for the Arts ===
Around 1945, painter Leon Berkowitz, poet Ida Fox Berkowitz, and artist Helmut Kern founded the Washington Workshop Center (also known as the Workshop Art Center or Washington Workshop Center for the Arts). The center became a key gathering place and gallery for the Washington Color School artists, including Morris Louis, Kenneth Noland, Howard Mehring, Thomas Downing, and Gene Davis. Berkowitz did not like the label "Washington Color School" and often rejected it for his own work.

=== Jefferson Place Gallery ===
Many of the Washington Color School artists exhibited at the Jefferson Place Gallery in Washington, D.C., originally directed by Alice Denney starting in 1957 (later owned and directed by Nesta Dorrance). Along with the original Washington Color School painters, a second generation also exhibited at Jefferson Place Gallery. (6/69, “Four Minds With It” Wash Star; Benjamin)

=== Washington Color Painters (1965) ===
The Washington Color School originally consisted of a group of painters who showed works in an exhibit called the Washington Color Painters at the now-defunct Washington Gallery of Modern Art in Washington, from June 25 to September 5, 1965. The exhibition's organizer was Gerald "Gerry" Nordland and the painters who exhibited were Gene Davis, Morris Louis, Kenneth Noland, Howard Mehring, Thomas Downing, and Paul Reed. This exhibition, which subsequently traveled to several other venues in the United States, including the Walker Art Center, solidified Washington's place in the national movement and defined what is considered the city's signature art movement, according to art historians and journalists alike.

=== Eighteenth Area Exhibition (1965, 1967) ===
After their initial benchmark exhibition, Davis, Mehring, and Reed were joined by Timothy Corkery, Willem de Looper, Sam Gilliam, and Jacob Kainen at The Seventeenth Area Exhibition of Artists of Washington and the Adjacent Area at The Corcoran Gallery of Art from November 12 to December 19, 1965. The Eighteenth Area Exhibition at The Corcoran from November 18 to December 31, 1967 again featured artists including de Looper, Corkery, Downing, Gilliam and Kainen.

== Artists ==
=== First generation ===
The six artists participating in the exhibition, Washington Color Painters (1965) were called the first generation.

- Gene Davis,
- Thomas Downing,
- Morris Louis,
- Howard Mehring,
- Kenneth Noland,
- Paul Reed.

=== Second generation ===
The group is thought to have expanded as it achieved a dominant presence in the Washington, D.C., visual art community through the 1960s into the 1970s.

- Leon Berkowitz,
- Chun Chen,
- Edward Corbett,
- Timothy Corkery,
- Willem de Looper,
- William Dutterer,
- Robert Franklin Gates,
- Sam Gilliam,
- Tom Green,
- James Hilleary,
- Valerie Hollister,
- Jacob Kainen,
- Rockne Krebs,
- Blaine Gledhill Larson,
- Alice Mavrogordato,
- Ed McGowin,
- Mary Pinchot Meyer,
- Robert W. Newmann,
- Carroll Sockwell,
- Robert Stackhouse,
- Alma Thomas,
- Hilda Thorpe,
- Anne Truitt,
- Kenneth Victor Young.
- James W. Twittey
- Kenneth Young

== Present-day ==
During spring and summer 2007, arts institutions in Washington, D.C., staged a citywide celebration of color field painting, including exhibitions at galleries and museums of works by members of the Washington Color School.

In 2011, a group of Washington art collectors began the Washington Color School Project, to gather and publish information about the history of the color painters and abstract art in Washington. Though some of them were not born in Washington, D.C., the artists exhibited together and represent Washington as a new hub for the visual arts.

== See also ==
- Modern art
- Western painting
- Abstract art
- Hard-edge painting
- Lyrical Abstraction
- Post-painterly abstraction
- Vincent Melzac, collector of paintings of the Washington Color School

== Sources ==
- J. D. Serwer. 1987. Gene Davis, A Memorial Exhibition. Washington, D.C.: Smithsonian Institution Press. ISBN 0-87474-854-2
- Introduction & Text by Roy Slade, "The Corcoran & Washington Art" Copyright 1976 The Corcoran Gallery of Art, Washington, D.C.: 2000 copies printed by Garamond Press, Baltimore, MD LCCC# 76-42098
- Smithsonian Archives of American Art, Interview with Gerald Nordland Conducted by Susan Larsen, Chicago, Illinois May 25–26, 2004
- Washington Art, catalog of exhibitions at State University College at Potsdam, NY & State University of New York at Albany, 1971 [no copyright or LCCC # listed], Introduction by Renato G. Danese, printed by Regal Art Press, Troy NY.
- The Vincent Melzac Collection, Foreword by Walter Hopps, Introduction by Ellen Gross Landau, Retrospective Notes on the Washington Color School by Barbara Rose, Copyright 1971 The Corcoran Gallery of Art, Washington, D.C.: printed by Garamond/Pridemark Press, Baltimore, MD LCCC#75-153646
