= Vincent Melzac =

American business executive and art collector

Vincent Melzac (January 7, 1914 – October 11, 1989) was an American business executive and art collector, best known as one of the earliest and most daring collectors of paintings of the Washington Color School. Born in Warsaw, Melzac grew up in Cleveland, where he attended Case Western Reserve University, earning an earning a master's degree in education. He continued his studies with a doctorate in education at Harvard University. Melzac went to Washington in the early 1940s to work for the Office of Emergency Planning. Often described as a larger than life figure, Melzac was briefly chief executive officer of the Corcoran Gallery of Art. Between 1969 and 1980, he donated 46 works to the Smithsonian American Art Museum, including works by Color field painters Morris Louis, Kenneth Noland, Alma Thomas, Jack Bush and Thomas Downing as well as abstract expressionists Willem de Kooning, Franz Kline, and Clyfford Still. Significant parts of his collection were also donated to the Phillips Collection, the Hirshhorn Museum, the Art Institute of Chicago, and the Fort Wayne Museum of Art, which had commissioned him in 1977 to conduct a planning study that ultimately led to the construction of a new museum building.

By training an educator, Melzac was short of stature, but not boldness, a characteristic reflected both in his business affairs and his art collection. His fortune came from a chain of beauty salons, and he owned a catfish farm in West Virginia. He had a reputation for demanding a hard bargain from painters, and it was rumored that his businesses were under investigation for false advertising.

coverage in Washington Star-News, November 30, 1972

In 1971, Melzac was called on to reorganize the Corcoran. Serving concurrently with director Gene Baro in an awkward administrative structure, he reduced the gallery's deficit from more than $535,000 to about $100,000 in two years. On November 3, 1972, at a black tie reception celebrating the opening of a major Sam Francis exhibition, Melzac and Baro came to blows. As recalled by Roy Slade (who succeeded Baro as Corcoran director),

Melzac seemed upset that people were not paying attention to his wife, busty and blonde, in a glittering silver dress. At the bottom of the grand staircase I was talking to Dom Bonham and a few friends. I looked behind me to see Gene Baro, blood streaming from his eye on to his white tuxedo shirt. Melzac was storming off with his wife. Gene stammered, "I think Melzac has gone to get a gun. I am going to lock myself in my office". I realized that with this altercation, I was basically now in charge, as I was the senior administrator left in the gallery.

Unfortunately for Melzac, a photograph of Baro's blood-streaming face was published in the New York Times and in Newsweek. Slade recounted, "The photograph of the bloody director was stark evidence that not all was well at the Corcoran." Both Melzac and Baro were dismissed by the Corcoran's board on November 30, 1972.

Melzac later became known as a breeder of Arabian race horses. He made a donation of seven horses to the people of Ireland in 1989 but when they arrived at the Irish National Stud they were considered "quite inferior" and not of breeding quality. Paintings from his art collection were for a time loaned to the Central Intelligence Agency, and he received the CIA's Agency Seal Medallion from Director William Casey in 1982. He died October 11, 1989, in Washington, D.C.
