= Paul Reed (artist) =

American artist (1919-2015)

- Born: March 28, 1919
- Died: September 26, 2015 (aged 96)
- Education: San Diego State University; Corcoran School of the Arts and Design
- Known for: Painting

Paul (Allen) Reed (March 28, 1919 – September 26, 2015) was an American artist most associated with the Washington Color School and Color Field Painting.

== Biography ==
At the time of his death in 2015, Reed was the last living member of the Washington Color School—an art group that gained national fame in the 1960s. Paul Allen Reed was born in Washington, D.C., in 1919 and attended McKinley High School. Reed moved to San Diego for college, but soon returned to D.C. to accept a job at the Washington Times-Herald in 1937 working in the graphics department masking out half-tones in advertisements. At the same time, he took art courses at the Corcoran School of Art during the day. Graphic design jobs would then take him to Atlanta and New York before Reed established himself permanently in D.C. in 1952. Reed worked as a freelance graphic designer throughout the 1950s to have the flexibility to paint and visit museums and galleries. In 1962 Reed joined the staff of the Peace Corps as a graphic designer in charge of all publication design.

Reed had his first solo exhibition at the Adams-Morgan Gallery in Washington, D.C., in January 1963. The paintings, executed in water-based acrylic paint on unprimed canvas, were characterized by a centralized image, often with a centrifugal motion within the petal-like shapes. Reed's next solo exhibition was at the East Hampton Gallery in New York in November of the same year. In the New York exhibition, the centrifugal force of the earlier paintings had now spun off a smaller companion painting that hovered a set distance away. Reed called these works his Satellite Paintings and they questioned the relation of a painting to the wall. Further exhibitions were held in New York at East Hampton Gallery in 1964 and 1966, the Bertha Schaefer Gallery in 1967 and 1971, and in D.C. at the Jefferson Place Gallery in 1964 and Pyramid Gallery in 1971 and 1973.

Reed was methodical in his painting; his works fall into considered series as he developed and refined an idea. The last work of a series is usually the largest, most complex, or has the greatest clarity. In 1965 Reed created his well-known series—the Disk paintings—where two corners of different color are set off by a diagonal band with a large circle at its center. With these works Reed blended colors by overlapping layers of separate colors, something that was distinct to the new water-based acrylic paints then available. Next Reed created compositions of zigzagging stripes where each line kept its pure color yet created secondary colors at each bend in the Upstart series of 1965. Further color overlapping was explored with the “plaid” effect of grids in the series Interchange, Inside Out, and Coherence of 1966. One of Reed's Coherence paintings belonging to the permanent collection of the National Gallery of Art was recently on view there. Within the Washington Color School, Reed was recognized as the most successful at using the transparency new acrylic paints offered to overlap colors, something Morris Louis (1912–1962) had explored in his Veil paintings but abandoned as he could not achieve the vibrancy he desired with the first generation of acrylic paints, Magna.

Reed systematically increased the complexity of his color relationships in his shaped canvas works from 1967 to 1972. Reed created increasingly complex forms by adding an additional side to his canvas shape each time he felt he had exhausted the color possibilities of the previous form. With each new shape, Reed applied color lessons learned from the prior series then expanded on them. Looking at the series Emerging (four sides), Topeka (five sides), Hackensack (six sides), and Zig-Fields (seven sides), from 1967 one sees how Reed created complicated geometric shapes to master intricate color challenges.

29 (1965), Kreeger Museum

Recognition for Reed as an early member of the Washington Color School came with his inclusion in Gerald Nordland's exhibition Washington Color Painters at the Washington Gallery of Modern Art in 1965. The exhibition traveled across the country including the Blanton Art Museum; the Rose Art Museum at Brandeis University and the Walker Art Center. The following year Reed was included in The Hard-Edge Trend at the Smithsonian American Art Museum.

In 1971 Reed left his Peace Corps job to teach full-time at the Corcoran School of Art. Reed's knowledge of art history was extensive, combined with expertise on technique and an engaging wit, he was an inspiring teacher. In 1972 Reed lost his large studio behind the Jefferson Hotel, moving him towards more intimately scaled works he could execute at home. In the 1980s, Reed created photography-based collages that juxtaposed with kaleidoscopic effect art historical and popular culture items, incongruences Reed found compelling. In the 1990s Reed did a series of gouache on paper diptychs that explore light and reflection.

Reed was included in the Corcoran Gallery of Art exhibition Washington Color and Light in 2011. The same year Reed had solo exhibitions at the Workhouse Art Center in Lorton, Virginia titled Ultraviolet to Infrared: Paul Reed - 50 Years and at Georgetown University in its library, Evolution Through Color: The Art of Paul Reed, which featured paintings, sculptures, studies, and prints. D. Wigmore Fine Art featured the artist in Paul Reed and the Shaped Canvas in 2013 and is currently showing three of Reed's painting in an exhibition titled 1960s Hard Edge Painting. Reed's large scale Zig-Field, 1967 was included in Washington Art Matters: 1940-1980 at the Katzen Center at American University in 2013. He also was historical consultant for the movie project, The Washington Color School film, called Unprimed Canvas which is being done by artist Barbara Januszkiewicz who Reed mentored.

Reed's work is in museums across the country, including the National Gallery of Art, Phillips Collection, the Corcoran Gallery of Art, the Hirshhorn Museum and Sculpture Garden, and the Smithsonian Museum of American Art, all in D.C.; the Museum of Fine Arts, Boston; the Art Institute of Chicago; the Detroit Institute of Art; Madison Museum of Contemporary Art; the Walker Art Center, Minneapolis; the Dallas Museum of Art; Greenville County Museum of Art, South Carolina; the High Museum of Art, Atlanta; the Oklahoma City Museum of Art; the Phoenix Art Museum; the San Francisco Museum of Modern Art and the Wadsworth Atheneum, in Hartford.

Reed was predeceased by his wife Esther and his two sons Robert Reed and Thomas Reed.

Reed died on September 26, 2015, at the age of 96. He was survived by his daughter, Jean Reed Roberts of Phoenix, Arizona.

== Sources ==
- Who's Who in America 1976-1997
- Who's Who in American Art 1973-1997
- The Dictionary of Art (MacMillan Co., London 1989)
- L'Avant Garde Abtraite L'Art Americain de 1950 a 1970 “Nouvelle Abstraction” – Claudine Humblet, Bruxelles
- The National Museum of American Art, Interactive CD ROM, 1995
- Introduction & Text by Roy Slade, "The Corcoran & Washington Art" Copyright 1976 The Corcoran Gallery of Art, Washington, D.C.: 2000 copies printed by Garamond Press, Baltimore, MD LCCC# 76-42098
- The Vincent Melzac Collection, Foreword by Walter Hopps, Introduction by Ellen Gross Landau, Retrospective Notes on the Washington Color School by Barbara Rose, Copyright 1971 The Corcoran Gallery of Art, Washington, D.C.: printed by Garamond/Pridemark Press, Baltimore, MD LCCC#75-153646
- Smithsonian Archives of American Art, Interview with Gerald Nordland Conducted by Susan Larsen, Chicago, Illinois May 25–26, 2004 http://www.aaa.si.edu/collections/oralhistories/transcripts/nordla04.htm
