= Thomas Downing (painter) =

American painter (1928–1985)

Thomas Downing (1928–1985) was an American painter, associated with the Washington Color School, which also featured Sam Gilliam, Kenneth Noland, Howard Mehring, Alma Thomas, and Paul Reed.

== Life and work ==
Thomas Downing was born in Suffolk, Virginia. He studied at Randolph-Macon College, Ashland, Virginia, where he received his Bachelor of Arts degree in 1948. He then studied at the Pratt Institute, a well-known art school in Brooklyn, New York, until 1950. That year he received a grant from the Virginia Museum of Fine Arts, enabling him to travel to Europe, where he studied briefly at the Académie Julian in Paris.

In 1951 he returned to the United States, and after serving in the U.S. Army, settled in Washington, D.C., where he began to teach, in 1953. The following summer, he enrolled in a summer institute at Catholic University, studying under Kenneth Noland. He became a friend of Noland, who became a significant influence on Downing's art and who was one of the founders of the Washington Color Field Movement.

In the late 1950s, Downing shared a studio with Howard Mehring, another artist of the Washington Color School and Color Field painting. In 1964 Clement Greenberg included Noland, Mehring, Downing and others in his traveling museum exhibition called Post-painterly Abstraction.

From 1965 to 1968, Downing taught at the Corcoran College of Art and Design in Washington, D.C. There he taught several people who in their turn became artists influenced by Downing's ideas.

His paintings to a large extent consisted of circles arranged in precise patterns on the canvas, with colors often chosen according to ideas of symmetry. Downing's Spot Paintings are his best known works.

In the last ten years of his life, Downing lived in Provincetown, Massachusetts. He died in October 1985 in Provincetown, Massachusetts at the age of 57. In its obituary the Washington Times characterized his death as mysterious. The newspaper was referring to the then recent demise of Washington Color Field artist Gene Davis (1920–1985) and to the earlier death of Howard Mehring (1931–1978), as well.

== Sources ==
- Various authors: Barbara Rose, Gerald Nordland, Walter Hopps, Hardy S. George; Breaking the Mold, Selections from the Washington Gallery of Modern Art, 1961–1968, exhibition catalogue, Oklahoma City Museum of Art 2007, ISBN 0-911919-05-8
