= Alice Mavrogordato =

- Born: Alice Blum; March 14, 1916; Vienna, Austria-Hungary
- Died: October 20, 2000 (aged 84); Washington, D.C., U.S.
- Other names: Alice Blum Mavrogordato
- Occupation(s): painter, translator
- Movement: Washington Color School, abstract art
- Spouse: Ralph S. Mavrogordato (m. 1948–2000; death)

Alice Mavrogordato (née Alice Blum; 1916–2000) was an Austrian-born American artist, and translator. She is known for her abstract oil paintings, and is associated with the Washington Color School movement. She worked as a translator during the Nuremberg trials in the mid-1940s.

== Early life ==
Her name at birth was Alice Blum, she was born on 14 March 1916 in Vienna, which at the time was part of Austria-Hungary. Her mother was Friederike (née Grossman) and her father was Ludwig Blum. At age 12, she took classes at the Vienna School of Applied Arts, with Franz Cižek. She had studied textile design in Austria from 1930 to 1932, and worked as a knitwear designer.

On March 12, 1938, the Anschluss, the annexation of Austria into Nazi Germany happened. In 1939, she left and moved to England, as a Jewish refugee. In 1941 and 1942 during the beginning of World War II, she was interned on the Isle of Man. After being released, she worked in London in a war production factory. After World War II, she worked for the United States Army, as a translator during the Nuremberg trials for military war crimes.

In 1948, she married Ralph S. Mavrogordato, an American soldier.

== Career ==
In 1951, she immigrated to Durham, North Carolina; followed by a move in 1953 to Washington, D.C. Around 1954, she studied at the Washington Workshop Center for the Arts, under Morris Louis and Kenneth Noland. Her first solo art exhibition was in 1958. She was known for her oil paintings.

She died of cancer on October 20, 2000, in Washington, D.C. She left her art estate of more than 300 works to the Republic of Austria.

== Exhibitions ==
- 1995: Women in Exile, (group exhibition), Palais Pálffy, Vienna, Austria
- 1979: (group exhibition), Plum Gallery, Kensington, Maryland
- 1957: New Faces, (group exhibition), Franz Bader Gallery, Washington, D.C.
