= Carroll Sockwell =

American painter

- Born: February 13, 1943; Washington, D.C., U.S.
- Died: July 9, 1992 (aged 49); Washington, D.C., U.S.
- Education: Corcoran School of Art
- Occupation: artist
- Known for: painting, drawings, sculptures

Carroll Sockwell (1943–1992) was an American artist whose nonrepresentational drawings, paintings, and assemblages drew upon both classical modernist and minimalist traditions and showed an ability to integrate geometric and gestural abstraction. He was particularly noted for his ability to introduce nuances of color and emphasis in bare and simple pictorial themes.

Difficult to label, his work was seen as paradoxical: "elegant and anguished, somber and yet playful, rigorous yet free." Throughout his career, he faced challenges that were beyond his control and seemed, as one observer said, to be "an artist who by birth, temperament and timing started out carrying a heavy load." Nonetheless, he also seemed to be his own worst enemy, disregarding the necessity of earning a living and alienating those who tried to help him.

== Early life and education ==
"Smudged, enigmatic calligraphic scrawls whisper across a row of five white rectangles. Jewel-like reds and blues glint through crisscross forests of shiny black crayon. A perfectly twisted curve of scrap metal has the power to rivet one to the spot. So few artists today are truly masters of their media. Even fewer appreciate the purely aesthetic value of line, color and composition. So when one has occasion to see an entire exhibition of works by an artist of the caliber of Carroll Sockwell, it comes as a revelation. Here is a craftsman who has never for a moment doubted the poetry, or the passion, that nonobjective abstraction is capable of expressing, and who has talent, sensitivity and vision enough to make it so."

— Washington Post critic, Michael Welzenbach, reviewing a retrospective solo exhibition in June 1992

Carroll Sockwell was born on February 13, 1943, in Washington, D.C. and grew up in a household headed by his maternal grandmother. His mother worked as a maid and his father sometimes worked as a laborer and sometimes served in the armed forces. His grandmother was also a maid. In addition to these relatives, an aunt, an uncle, and four brothers also lived in the home. With his father infrequently present, his mother had charge of his upbringing until, in 1948, she began a 15-year period of hospitalization for schizophrenia. On her departure, his aunt became his caregiver.

Sockwell attended public schools in the District and, while still a pupil, was himself committed to the same psychiatric hospital as the one where his mother was a patient. With support from social workers, Sockwell became interested first in music, then in theater, and finally in painting as possible careers. In 1957, at the age of 14, he entered the Corcoran School of Art. The following year, he won a prize for a work he created there. (Note: ""student," "prize")

During the time he was hospitalized for psychiatric treatment at St. Elizabeth's, Sockwell met Elinor Ulman, a foundational figure in the field of art therapy. (Note: "treatment," "ambitious," "art") She became a mentor, introducing him to the principal D.C. art galleries and museums and encouraging his artistic ambitions. In 1959, at the age of 17, Sockwell left his family home. He moved to Manhattan where he found work at Bonwit Teller and met important abstract expressionist artists, such as Barnett Newman and Willem de Kooning, primarily by visiting bars that they frequented, such as the famous Cedar Bar. Failing to find a foothold in the New York art scene, he returned to Washington D.C. in 1963. Of that four-year period, he later said "I was almost the only black. It was hard to be accepted."

Back in Washington he lived hand to mouth for a time. In 1965 he began a three-year stint as curator in the city's non-profit African-American gallery, Barnett-Aden. In 1968 or soon after, Sockwell became acquainted with Walter Hopps, James Harithas, and Harry Lunn, each of whom began to influence, support, and sustain his work. Hopps was then director of the Washington Gallery of Modern Art which, in 1968, was absorbed by the Corcoran Gallery. Harithas was then director of that gallery and Harry Lunn had just opened a commercial gallery in Washington. (Note: "Hopps," "Lunn," "Harithas")

== Career in art ==
In 1958, then aged 15, Sockwell was awarded a prize for his painting, "Bridge With the Sun." In 1966 he exhibited in a group show held at the Tarot Gallery in Manhattan. Two years later his work appeared beside works by Michael Clark, Robert Newman, and Kenneth Wade in an exhibition of hard-edge art at the Corcoran Gallery. He showed the following year in an NAACP-sponsored group exhibition held at the Nordness Gallery in Manhattan. Other exhibitors included Norman Lewis, Charles McGee, Felrath Hines, Alma W. Thomas, Walter Williams. At the same time his work appeared in a group of seventeen artists at the Ringling Museum in Sarasota and at about this time he showed at the Margaret Dickey Gallery in the District. (Note: "seventeen," "Ringling," "Dickey") In 1971 a solo exhibition at the Jefferson Place Gallery called "Mirror Compositions" drew favorable criticism in both the Washington Post and Jet magazine. Richard Paul, the Post's arts critic, that these works "successfully synthesized all his previous experiments". Two of those Mirror Compositions are now held in the permanent collection of the Whitney. Another solo, this at the Corcoran, followed in 1974 and in the same year his work appeared in group shows at the Whitney and Brooklyn Museums. That year he also executed a commission for a 40-foot-long mural for the psychiatric ward of D.C. General Hospital. (Note: "mural," "psychiatric ward") He subsequently showed in Washington commercial spaces, including the Middendorf, Fraser, and Fiedler galleries. (Note: "Middendorf," "Fraser," "Fiedler")

"In an era of loud, large and too often bombastic imagery, Sockwell's [work] has far more in common with the intimate visual poesy of Paul Klee's or Wassily Kandinsky's, of an earlier, more severely intellectual period."

— Michael Welzenbach in the Washington Post, June 13, 1992

"I am interested in composition, line, the intellectual side of art. I'm not really interested in the prettiness but rather the strength of art. I want my art to be my own personal statement."

— Carroll Sockwell in an interview by Washington Post reporter Judith Weinraub, June 13, 1992

Sockwell continued to show during the rest of the 1980s and first two years of the 1990s. On June 4, 1992, a solo exhibition of Sockwell's work opened at the Washington Project for the Arts. One critic said it was "one of its worthiest and most compelling shows." One critic wrote that despite Sockwell's reputation for being somewhat difficult—"rather excessively endowed with what is known as 'artistic temperament'"—his work was widely shown and enthusiastically received by both gallery goers and collectors.

In fact, Sockwell was often described as his own worst enemy. One critic said in a review of Sockwell's 1992 show that although "everyone praises his art," many people in the local art scene were exasperated with Sockwell. He drank too much, alienated the owners of commercial galleries that showed his work, refused to promote his work, would not meet with collectors who were interested in buying, and seemed constitutionally unable to hold down a job. One acquaintance said that Sockwell refused to engage in the business side of art, saying "Carroll thinks being an artist is enough." Another said he did not paint as a career, but because he had to, "like a raw nerve." In the years preceding this show Sockwell suffered periods when despite the assurance of high-priced sales he was unable to work. By 1992 he had squandered the comfortable life he had earned and returned to the destitute state of his early years as an artist. (Note: "continued to show," "comfortable living," "destitute state")

On July 9, 1992, Sockwell ended his life by jumping off the Pennsylvania Avenue Bridge in Washington's Foggy Bottom. That fall, Washington Post writer Gene Weingarten wrote a lengthy appreciation of his work and explication of his complicated temperament and background.

In the years following Sockwell's death, his work has continued to appear in commercial galleries and museum exhibitions., including in about 20 group shows from 1997 through the present. Among the most significant of Sockwell's solo shows was a retrospective in February 1999 at Case Western Reserve University's Mather Gallery curated by Sockwell friend and mentor James Hilleary. In 2004 Sam Gilliam curated "Carroll Sockwell: AM i THE BeST?" at the Washington Arts Museum at Edison Place Gallery; in 2009 Marin-Price showed Sockwell's abstract expressionist paintings; in 2021 the Buchanan Partners Gallery at George Mason University held a show entitled, "Carroll Sockwell: Grey Compositions" and mounted the same show the following year in its Founders Gallery. And in 2024 the Brady Museum at George Washington University hung "A Corcoran Homecoming: The Art of Carroll Sockwell".

== Style and influences ==
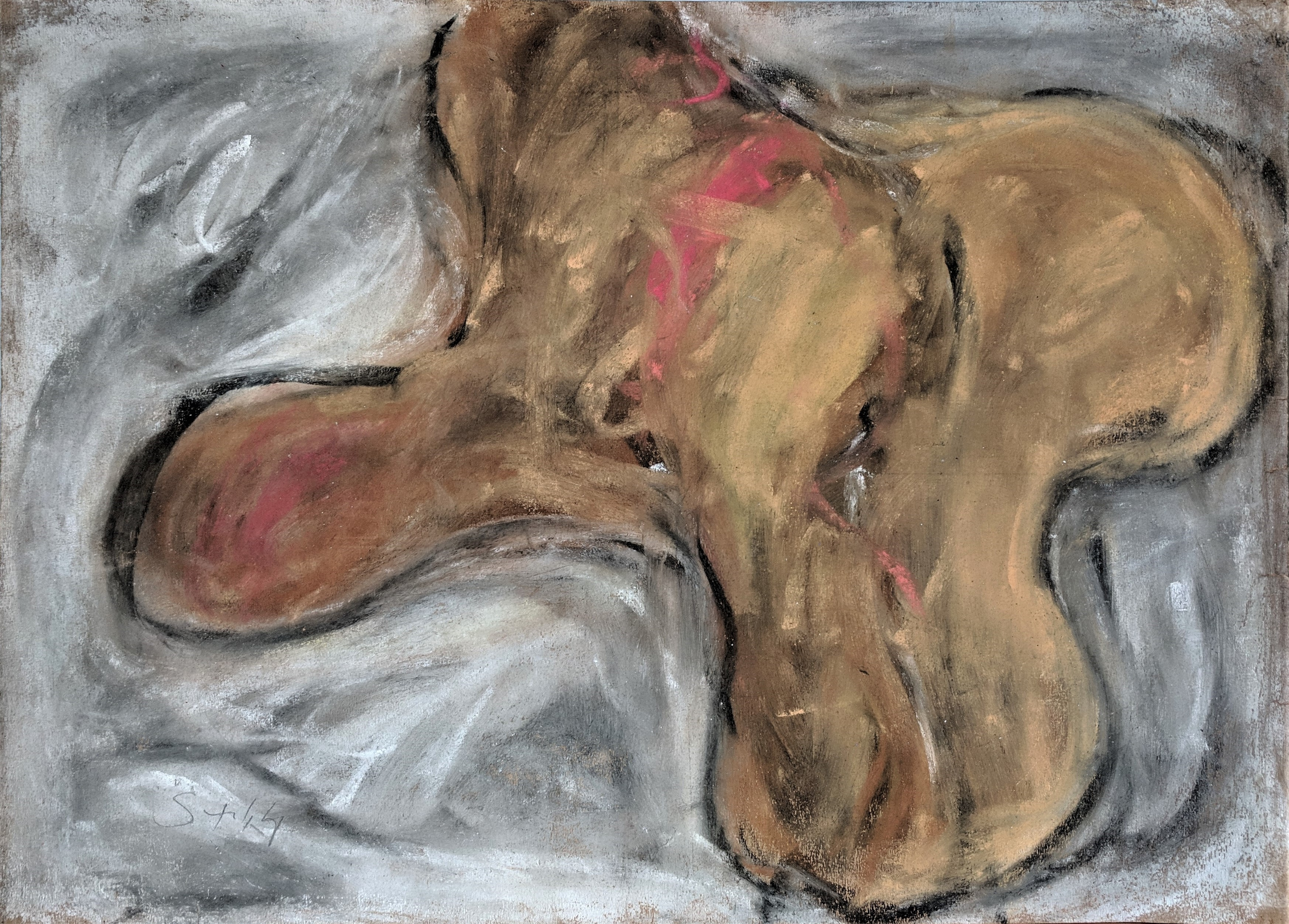
Carroll Sockwell, Untitled, 1975, oil pastel on paper, 32 x 40 inches

Carroll Sockwell, Untitled, about 1965, gouache on paper, 11 x 8 inches

Carroll Sockwell, Untitled, 1973, watercolor and acrylic on paper, 21 1/2 x 29 1/2 inches

Carroll Sockwell, Untitled, 1988, India ink and colored pencil on paper, 30 x 36 inches

Carroll Sockwell, Legend 3, 1989, mixed media on paper, 32 x 40 inches

Sockwell's work was nonrepresentational, integrating organic abstraction, geometric abstraction, and gestural abstraction. Critics saw paradoxes in it, perceiving elements both rigorous and free. One said he achieved an equipoise between the "feral" and the "tame." A colleague said his "greatest strength lies in his ability to hold polar opposites and contradictions in his mind and resolve them visually in his art."

Most critics saw in Sockwell's work the influence of his troubled life. They found his style difficult to label. One critic saw in it a unique "synthesis of classical modernism and minimalism." An acquaintance, when asked to pick a phrase to describe Sockwell's art, came up with "classicism in despair."

Sockwell worked mostly on paper. He used graphite, charcoal, pastel, watercolor, gouache, and acrylic. Grays, blacks, and whites dominate much of his work. Most of his output was two-dimensional, but he also made mixed-media wall constructions. He made a few large works and many small ones.

The untitled work of about 1965, shown upper left, is an example of Sockwell's handling of gouache in grays and blacks on paper. The untitled work of 1973, shown upper right, is an example of his handling of watercolor and acrylic in multiple colors on paper. The untitled work of 1988, shown lower left, is an example of Sockwell's handling of India ink with subtle use of colored pencil on paper. The work called "Legend 3," shown lower right, is an example of Sockwell's handling of mixed media on paper.

Reviewing the exhibition that opened just before Sockwell's death, Washington Post critic, Michael Welzenbach, summarized his art as "the invention of beauty and movement for their own sakes, a series of interconnected riffs revolving around a steady chord progression, and a tempo that seems never to falter."

== Personal life and family ==
The Sockwell family lived in a house on Virginia Avenue at a location in Foggy Bottom where the Watergate Hotel now stands. It consisted of Sockwell's maternal grandmother, Sarah Wilson, along with an aunt, Edna Johnson, and her husband, Lonnie Johnson. Sockwell's parents were Luther and Annie Sockwell, and his siblings, all of them older brothers, were Edward (twelve years his senior), Paul (eight years), Luther (six years), and Eugene (five years). His mother was born in South Carolina in about 1912; his father in North Carolina in about 1903. A few years before his birth, the household's women earned their livings as domestic servants in private homes. Lonnie was then a dishwasher in a restaurant and Luther a laborer in a cemetery.

Sockwell's father was an alcoholic and reportedly had two other families. His mother suffered a schizophrenic breakdown in 1948 and spent 15 years in St. Elizabeths Hospital. Sockwell's aunt, Edna Johnson, took care of him and his brothers with reluctance. One of them told a reporter that she drove them out of the house, one by one.

At various times Sockwell was a patient at St. Elizabeths and in the psychiatric ward of D.C. General Hospital. He was both gay and African-American. He did not leave a suicide note and did not indicate to anyone that he was thinking about ending his life.
