= Howard Mehring =

American painter (1931–1978)

'Chroma Double' by Howard Mehring, 1965

Howard Mehring (1931–1978) was a twentieth-century painter born in Washington, D.C.

Howard Mehring is associated with Color Field painting and the Washington Color School and the artists at Jefferson Place Gallery. Mehring and Robert Gates both received grants from The Woodward Foundation to travel in Europe during 1971 to broaden their art backgrounds. His connection with Vincent Melzac was instrumental in developing his work. Early in his career (1956–1958) he shared studio space with Thomas Downing, with whom he had been a student of Kenneth Noland at Catholic University. Some of their paintings from that period are difficult to tell apart.

Mehring's early work is a "Washington version" of abstract expressionism, with the loose handling of paint on a surface but a much more transparent use of magna paint, an acrylic paint developed by Leonard Bocour. The stylistic resemblance to Mountains and Sea by Helen Frankenthaler is obvious.

As Mehring developed as an artist his work became much more structured. He went from a painted surface with an all-over pattern to cutting up canvas with the all-over pattern and gluing it back together. Later he used some of those same forms to make "hard-edge paintings", such as Chroma Double from 1965, in the collection of the Honolulu Museum of Art.

Mehring and the other Washington Color School painters were in debt to the writings of Clement Greenberg. In 1964 Greenberg included Mehring in his traveling museum exhibition called Post-painterly Abstraction.
