= Alma Thomas =

American painter (1891–1978)

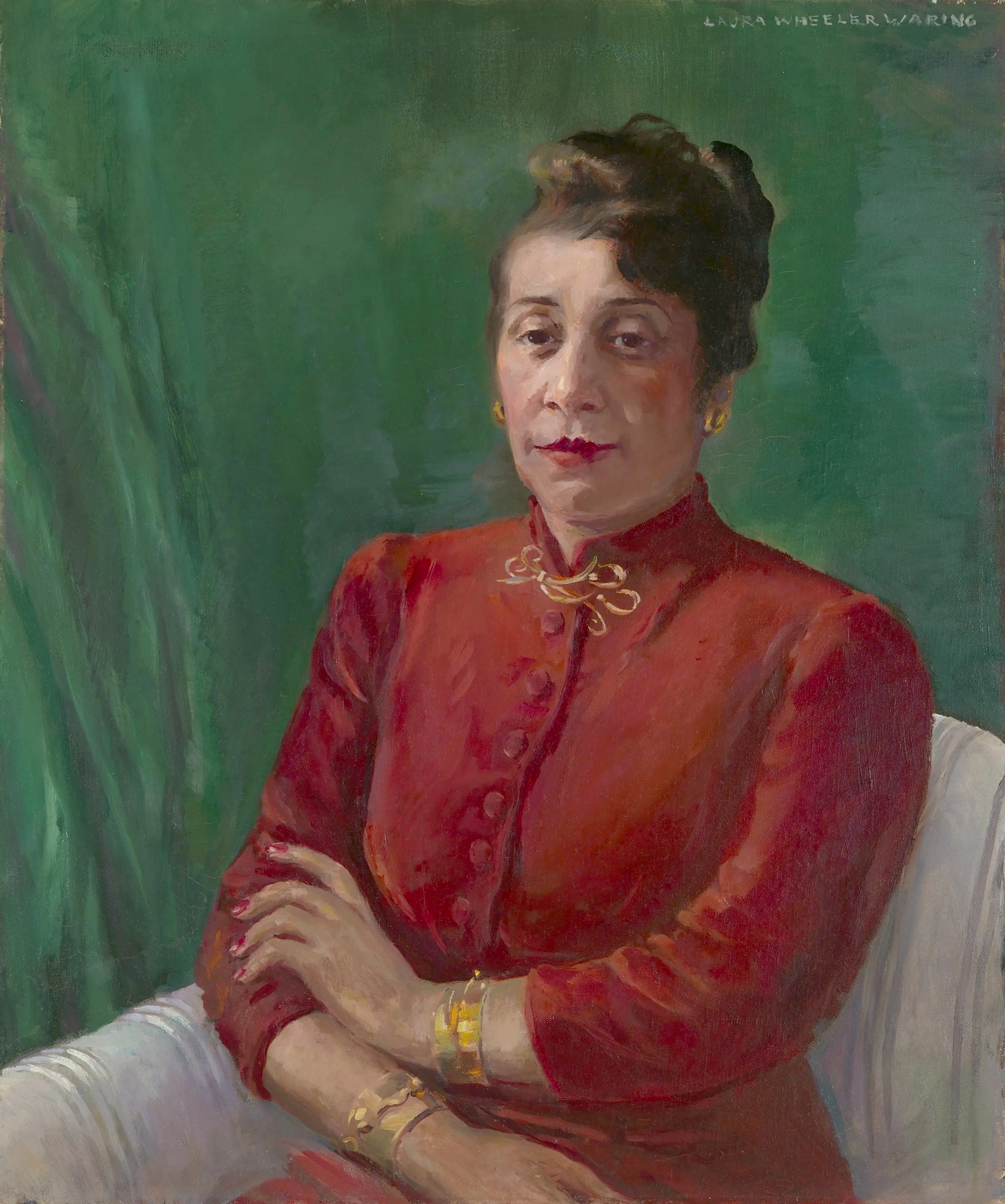
- Portrait of a Lady (Alma Thomas), 1947 by Laura Wheeler Waring
- Born: Alma Woodsey Thomas; September 22, 1891; Columbus, Georgia, U.S.
- Died: February 24, 1978 (aged 86); Washington, D.C.
- Education: Howard University; Columbia University
- Known for: Painting
- Notable work: Sky Light; Iris, Tulips, Jonquils and Crocuses; Watusi (Hard Edge); Wind and Crepe Myrtle Concerto; Air View of a Spring Nursery; Milky Way; Flowers at Jefferson Memorial; Untitled (Music Series); Red Rose Sonata; Breeze Rustling Through Fall Flowers; The Eclipse
- Movement: Expressionism; Realism
- Parents: John Harris Thomas (father); Amelia Cantey Thomas (mother)
- Website: Michael Rosenfeld Gallery

Alma Woodsey Thomas (September 22, 1891 – February 24, 1978) was an American artist and art teacher who lived and worked in Washington, D.C., and is now recognized as a major American painter of the 20th century. She is the first African-American woman to be included in the White House's permanent art collection. Thomas is best known for the "exuberant", colorful, abstract paintings that she created after she retired from a 35-year career teaching art at Washington's Shaw Junior High School.

Thomas, who is often considered a member of the Washington Color School art movement but alternatively classified by some as an Expressionist and/or Black Abstractionist, earned her teaching degree from University of the District of Columbia (known as Miner Normal School at the time). She was the first graduate of Howard University's art department, and maintained connections to that university through her life. She achieved success as an African-American female artist despite the segregation and prejudice of her time.

Thomas's reputation has continued to grow since her death. Her paintings are displayed in notable museums and collections and have been the subject of several books and solo museum exhibitions. The Smithsonian American Art Museum maintains the world's largest public collection of her work. In 2021, a museum sold Thomas's painting Alma's Flower Garden in a private transaction for $2.8 million.

== Life and work ==
=== Childhood, education, and early teaching positions ===
Alma Thomas was born on September 22, 1891, in Columbus, Georgia, as the oldest of four daughters, to John Harris Thomas, a businessman, and Amelia Cantey Thomas, a dress designer. Her mother and aunts, she later wrote, were teachers and Tuskegee Institute graduates. She was creative as a child, although her serious artistic career began much later in life. While growing up, Thomas displayed her artistic capabilities, and enjoyed making small pieces of artwork such as puppets, sculptures, and plates, mainly out of clay from the river behind her childhood home. Despite a growing interest in the arts, Thomas was "not allowed" to go into art museums as a child. She was provided with music lessons, as her mother played the violin.

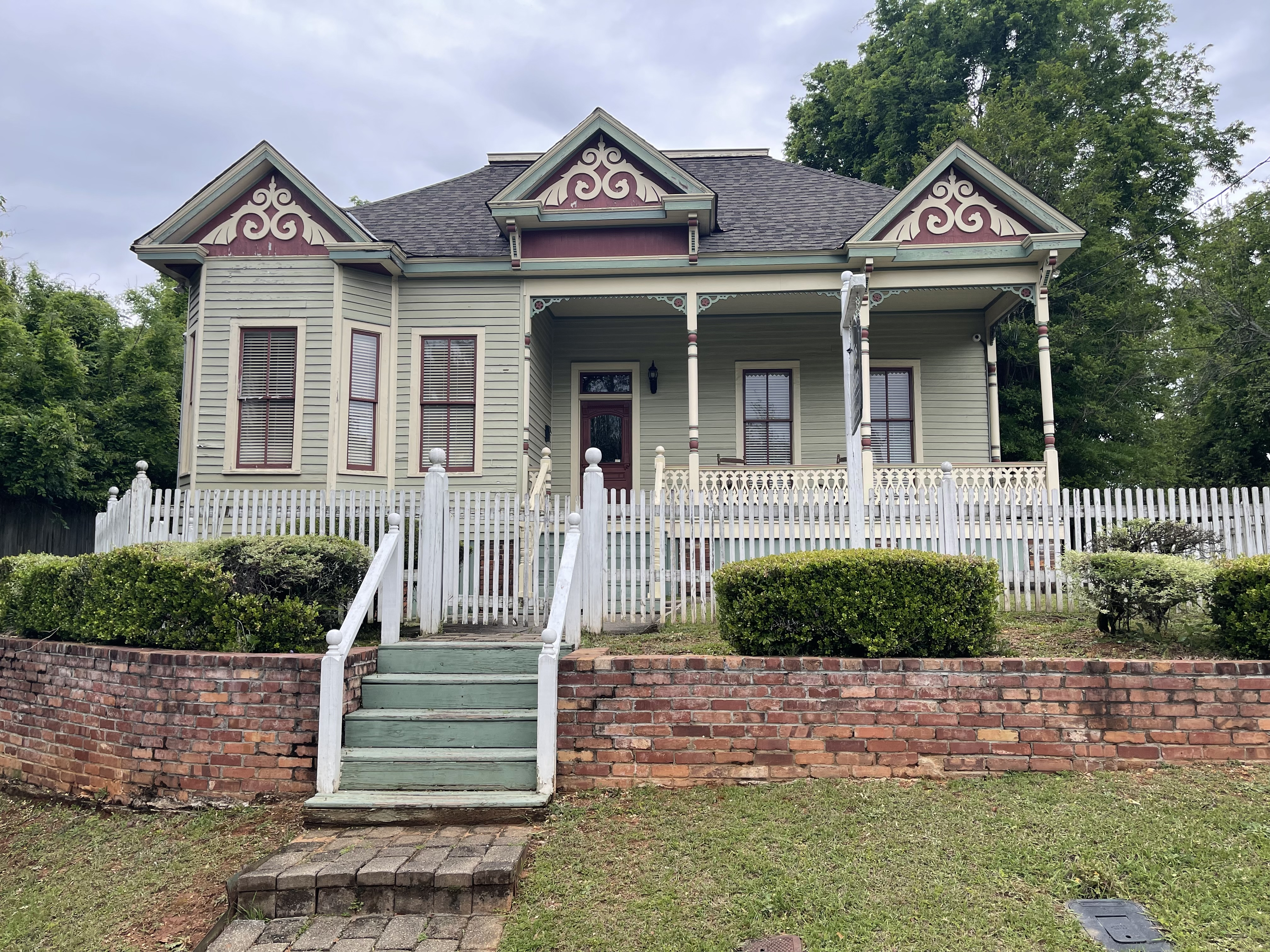
Alma Thomas's childhood home in Columbus, Georgia

In 1907, when Thomas was 16, the family moved to the Logan Circle neighborhood of Washington, D.C. Describing the family move, she later wrote, "When I finished grade school in Columbus, there was nowhere that I could continue my education, so my parents decided to move the family to Washington." Thomas was also able to access the libraries in Washington, unlike Columbus." Her parents made this move despite that the family "kind of came down a bit," socially and economically, in leaving their upper-middle class life in Georgia. Other writers have pointed to the Atlanta race riots and racial massacre of 1906 as a possible reasons for leaving Georgia. As another example of the racial violence that her family faced in Georgia, Alma's father had an encounter with a lynch mob shortly before Alma was born, her family attributed her poor hearing to the fright from that incident. Although still segregated, the nation's capital was known to offer more opportunities for African Americans than most other cities. As she wrote in the 1970s, "At least Washington's libraries were open to Negroes, whereas Columbus excluded Negroes from its only library." In Washington, Thomas attended Armstrong Technical High School, where she took her first art classes. About them, she said "When I entered the art room, it was like entering heaven. . . . The Armstrong High School laid the foundation for my life." In high school, she excelled at math and science, and architecture specifically interested her. A miniature schoolhouse that she made from cardboard using techniques learned in her architecture studies at Armstrong was exhibited at the Smithsonian in 1912. Although she expressed an interest in becoming an architect, it was unusual for women to work in this profession and this limited her prospects.

After graduating from Armstrong High School" in 1911, she studied kindergarten education at Miner Normal School (now known as University of the District of Columbia), earning her teaching credentials in 1913. In 1914, she obtained a teaching position in the Princess Anne schools on the Eastern Shore of Maryland, where she taught for four months. In 1915, she started teaching kindergarten at the Thomas Garrett Settlement House in Wilmington, Delaware, until 1921.

Thomas entered Howard University in 1921, at age 30, entering as a junior because of her previous teacher training. She started as a home economics student, planning to specialize in costume design, only to switch to fine art after studying under art department founder James V. Herring. Her artistic focus at Howard was on sculpture; Romare Bearden and Henry Henderson described the paintings she produced during her college education as "academic and undistinguished." She earned her Bachelor of Science in Fine Arts in 1924 from Howard, becoming the first graduate from the university's fine arts program. It has been suggested that might have been first African-American or American woman to earn a bachelor's art degree, however Mary Jane Patterson received her BA, in 1862, nearly 60 years earlier.

=== Post-college career ===
In 1924, Thomas began teaching art at Shaw Junior High School, a Black school in the then-segregated public schools of Washington, D.C., where she worked until her retirement in 1960; she wrote, "I was there for thirty-five years and occupied the same classroom." (Note: The number in this sentence is typed as "thirty-eight," but in one of the three copies, the "eight" is corrected by hand to "five.") She taught alongside fellow artist Malkia Roberts. While at Shaw Junior High, she started a community arts program that encouraged student appreciation of fine art. The program supported marionette performances and the distribution of student designed holiday cards which were given to soldiers at the Tuskegee Veterans Administration Medical Center. Also, according to her reminiscences, "At Shaw, I organized the first art gallery in the D.C. public schools in 1938, securing paintings by outstanding Negro artists from the Howard Gallery of Art."

The three and a half decades of Thomas's teaching career, from 1924 to 1960, were described by Thurlow Tibbs, the D.C. African-American art dealer (and grandson of Thomas's friend Lillian Evans, the opera singer) as Thomas's "fermenting period;" during them she absorbed many ideas and influences, and after 1960 from those ideas and influences she would create her distinctive art. While she taught at Shaw Junior High, Thomas continued to pursue her art, her formal and informal education, and activities with the Washington, D.C. art community, the latter often in ways connected to Howard University.

During this time, Thomas painted, especially in watercolor; while her style in the 1930s was still "quite traditional" and naturalistic, she was called a "brilliant watercolorist." Over summers, she would travel to New York City to visit art museums, including the Metropolitan Museum of Art, and galleries.

During the summers of 1930 through 1934, she attended Teachers College of Columbia University, earning her Masters in Art Education in 1934; her studies focused on sculpture, and she wrote her thesis on the use of marionettes.

In the summer of 1935, she studied marionettes in New York City with the German-American puppeteer Tony Sarg, the father of modern puppetry in America.

In 1936, she founded an organization, called the School Arts League Project, to bring art opportunities to children.

In 1943, Thomas helped James W. Herring, her former professor at Howard, and Alonzo J. Aden found the Barnett-Aden Gallery, the first successful Black-owned private art gallery in the United States. She served as the gallery's vice president. Thomas's association with the Barnett-Aden Gallery has been described as "critical to" and, according to curator Adelyn Dohme Breeskin, the "pivotal" development in, her development as a professional artist." It put her into contact with leading contemporary national artists, which "heightened her awareness of art trends and directions," and it provided exposure to local artists which "both challenged and inspired her."

In the 1940s Thomas also joined Lois Mailou Jones's artist community, "The Little Paris Group (or "Little Paris Studio," or "Little Paris Studio group"). This group of Black Washington artists was founded by Jones and Céline Marie Tabary, both artists and members of the Howard University art faculty (Jones from 1930 to 1977, and Tabary beginning in 1945). The date of the group's founding is described variously as during the German occupation of Paris (i.e., 1940 to 1944), "the late 1940s," 1945, 1946, or 1948. It met either weekly or twice per week, at Jones' studio, the "Little Paris studio," in her home at 1220 Quincy Street NE, in Washington's Brookland neighborhood. It existed for five years. It offered developing artists an opportunity to paint from the model, to improve their techniques -- "developing skills and styles," and "to hone their skills and exchange critiques"—as well as a salon, or discussion forum—to "talk about the latest developments in modern art, particularly as it was centered in Paris." Other members of the group in addition to Jones and Tabary included Delilah Pierce and Thomas, as well as Bruce Brown, Ruth Brown, Richard Dempsey, Barbara Linger, Don Roberts, Desdemona Wade, Frank West, and Elizabeth Williamson. A photo, from Thomas's archives, of a 1948 gathering of the group shows thirteen artists and a male model.

In 1958, Thomas visited art centers in Western Europe with Temple University students in an extensive tour arranged by that university's Tyler School of Art.

Her involvement with the Little Paris Group is said to have inspired Thomas to seek further academic training at American University. One source states that in the early 1950s, "the A.U. art department was regarded in many quarters as 'the' avant-garde art department in the nation." Accordingly, in 1950, at the age of 59, she began a decade of studies at that university, taking night and weekend classes, studying art, including art history and painting. At American University she studied painting with Robert Franklin Gates and Ben "Joe" Summerford. But Jacob Kainen was her most influential teacher there, and would become a close friend for the rest of her lifetime. When Thomas studied with Kainen in fall 1957, he considered her a fellow artist rather than a student. Kainen had met Thomas in 1934, at the Barnet-Aden Gallery, and in 1957, he agreed to take over teaching an intensive year-long A.U. class for six selected top painting students, including Thomas, but the administration allowed 32 students, many of them beginners, to take the class and Kainen quit in frustration after one term.

When Thomas began her advanced studies at American University in 1950, she was still a figurative painter. During the 1950s her style evolved in several major shifts, from figurative painting to cubism and abstract expressionism, with "monumental," dark paintings largely in blue and brown tones, to beginning to embrace the bright colors that she would later use in her signature style.

=== Artistic career ===
"Creative art is for all time and is therefore independent of time. It is of all ages, of every land, and if by this we mean the creative spirit in man which produces a picture or a statue is common to the whole civilized world, independent of age, race and nationality; the statement may stand unchallenged."
-Alma Thomas, 1970

In 1960, Thomas retired from teaching and became a full-time professional artist when she was 68 or 69.

In the 1960s, she began creating Color Field paintings, inspired by the work of the New York School and Abstract Expressionism.

Thomas was known to work in her home studio (a small living room), creating her paintings by "propping the canvas on her lap and balancing it against the sofa." She worked out of the kitchen in her house, creating works like Watusi (Hard Edge) (1963), a manipulation of the Matisse cutout The Snail, in which Thomas shifted shapes around and changed the colors that Matisse used, and named it after a Chubby Checker song.

In contrast with most other members of the Washington Color School, she did not use masking tape to outline the shapes in her paintings. Her technique involved drawing faint pencil lines across the canvas to create shapes and patterns, and filling the canvas with paint afterward. Her pencil lines are apparent in many of her finished pieces, she did not erase them.

Thomas's post-retirement artwork had a notable focus on color theory. Her work at the time resonated with that of Vasily Kandinsky (who was interested in the emotional capabilities of color) and of the Washington Color Field Painters, "something that endeared her to critics . . . but also raised questions about her 'blackness' at a time when younger African-American artists were producing works of racial protest." She stated, "The use of color in my paintings is of paramount importance to me. Through color I have sought to concentrate on beauty and happiness in my painting rather than on man's inhumanity to man." Speaking again about her use of color she said: "Color is life, and light is the mother of color."

March on Washington (1964) at the National Gallery of Art in 2022

In 1963, she walked in the March on Washington with her friend, the opera singer Lillian Evans. Although Thomas was largely an apolitical artist, she portrayed the 1963 event in a 1964 painting. A detail from that painting became a 2005 U.S. postage stamp commemorating the March on Washington.

Pansies in Washington (1969) at the National Gallery of Art in 2022

Her first retrospective exhibit was in 1966 (April 24–May 17) at the Gallery of Art at Howard University, curated by art historian James A. Porter. It included 34 works from 1959 to 1966. For this exhibition, she created Earth Paintings, a series of nature-inspired abstract works, including Resurrection (1966), which in 2014 would be bought for the White House collection. She is the first African-American woman to be included in the White House's permanent art collection.

Thomas and the artist Delilah Pierce, a friend, would drive into the countryside where Thomas would seek inspiration, pulling ideas from the effects of light and atmosphere on rural environments.

To meet the challenge posed by the Howard show, according to Romare Bearden and Henry Henderson, her style changed again, in a crucial way: "Thomas evolved the specific style now recognized as her signature - playing color against color and over color with small, irregular rectangular shapes of dense, often intense color." This exhibition received a supportive review from Helen Hoffman in The Washington Post of May 4, 1966, titled "colorful abstract reflects her spirit".

Inspired by the Moon landing in 1969, Alma Thomas began her second major theme of paintings. The series Space, Snoopy and Earth applied pointillism. She evoked mood by dramatic contrast of color with mosaic style, using dark blue against pale pink and orange colors, depicting an abstraction and accidental beauty through color. Most works in these series have circular, horizontal, and vertical patterns. These patterns can generate a conceptual feeling of floating. The patterns also generate energy within the canvas. The contrast of colors creates a powerful color segregation, and maintains visual energy.

Earth Sermon - Beauty, Love and Peace (1971) at the Hirshhorn Museum and Sculpture Garden in 2022

Between 1967 and 1975, Thomas received several awards and recognitions from various American art organizations and museums. In 1967, Thomas won an honorable mention in the American Austrian Society's painting exhibition with her painting The Viennese Waltzes, and later in 1972, at the age of 81, Thomas was the first African-American woman to have a solo exhibition at the Whitney Museum of American Art. Later the same year, a much larger exhibition was held at the Corcoran Gallery of Art. Thomas denied labels placed upon her as an artist and would not accept any barriers inhibiting her creative process and art career, including her identity as a Black woman. She believed that the most important thing was for her to continue creating her visions through her artwork and work in the art world despite racial segregation. Thomas was still discriminated against as a Black female artist and was critiqued for her abstract style as opposed to other Black Americans who worked with figuration and symbolism to fight oppression. Her works were featured alongside many other African-American artists in galleries and shows, such as the first Black-owned gallery in the District of Columbia.

Thomas at the opening of her solo exhibition at the Whitney Museum in 1972

After her show at the Whitney, Thomas's fame within the fine arts community rocketed. Her newfound recognition was partly due to Robert Doty's vocal support of her, as he organized Thomas's Whitney show as part of a series of African-American artist exhibitions, intended to protest their lack of representation. New York critics were impressed with Thomas's modern style, especially given that she was a nearly 80-year-old woman at the time of her national debut. The New York Times reviewed her exhibit four times, calling her paintings "expert abstractions, tachiste in style, faultless in their handling of color." Many white critics complimented her as "the Signac of current color painters" and as "gifted, ebullient abstractionist". Alma Thomas's philosophy of her art is that her works are full of energy, and those energies cannot be destroyed or created.

New York art curator and editor Thomas B. Hess bought Thomas's 1972 painting Red Roses Sonata, and in 1976 his family's foundation gave the piece to the Metropolitan Museum of Art. Joshua Taylor, director from 1970 to 1981 of the National Collection of Fine Arts (now the Smithsonian American Art Museum), also purchased some of her work, and wrote to Thomas in 1975, thanking her for a painting that hung in his living room: "It's like having Spring well before its appointed date."

Mary Beth Edelson's Some Living American Women Artists / Last Supper (1972) appropriated Leonardo da Vinci’s The Last Supper, with the heads of notable women artists collaged over the heads of Christ and his apostles; Alma Thomas was among those notable women artists. This image, addressing the role of religious and art historical iconography in the subordination of women, became "one of the most iconic images of the feminist art movement."

=== Personal life ===
Thomas told the New York Times in 1977 that she had "never married a man but my art. What man would have ever appreciated what I was up to?" She wrote, "Once upon a time it was said, don't die having a "Miss" on your tombstone. I feel very proud of having maintain[ed] my Miss. I say that Miss stand[s] for all the Jackasses I missed in life." She added, "A fine man is a delight, but for God sake don't get entangled with a Jackass." She had an active social life, with many artist friends. She "rarely missed" a museum or gallery opening in Washington.

Thomas lived in the same family house in Washington, at 1530 15th Street, NW, for nearly her entire life, from 1907 when her family moved from Georgia so she could attend high school until she died in 1978 (aside from a few years in her 20s when she worked elsewhere). Her younger sister John Maurice Thomas, who was named for their father and had a career as a librarian at Howard University, shared the house with her. That home, now known as the Alma Thomas House, was built in about 1875 and is listed on the National Register of Historic Places. 15th Street between Church and Q streets was renamed Alma Thomas Way on May 26, 2025.

=== Death and archives ===
Alma Thomas died on February 24, 1978, in Howard University Hospital, following aortic surgery.

Thomas' papers were donated in several periods between 1979 and 2004 to the Archives of American Art by her sister, J. Maurice Thomas.

== Artistic style ==
Alma Thomas' early work was representational in manner. As a Black woman, she focused her work on creative spirit rather than race or gender. Thomas believed that creativity should be independent of gender or race, creating works focusing on accidental beauty and the abstraction of color.

After further education at American University and influenced by James V. Herring and Lois Mailou Jones, her work became more abstract. Toward the end of her life, her style moved "to a color-filled, impastoed geometric abstraction of tessellated brushstroke patterns." These paintings have been compared to Byzantine mosaics and the pointillist paintings of Georges-Pierre Seurat. Thomas' style has qualities similar to West African paintings as well as Byzantine mosaics.

Mars Dust (1972) at the Whitney Museum in 2023

Her watercolor and oil paintings incorporated the use of (sometimes overlapping) colorful rectangles. She continued to use this technique in her works, which explored colors found in trees, flowers, gardens, and other natural imagery. Her painting Evening Glow was inspired in part by Thomas's interest in the colors of natural world: "The holly tree outside her living room intrigued Thomas with designs formed by its leaves against the window panes, and with patterns of light and shade cast on the floor and walls inside her home." She called her paintings 'Alma's Stripes,' as the overlapping shapes of paint created elongated rectangles. Later works were inspired by space exploration and the cosmos. The title of her painting Mars Dust (1972) alluded to news stories of a dust storm on Mars..

== Later reactions, exhibits, and developments ==
Red Azaleas Singing and Dancing Rock and Roll Music (1976) at the Smithsonian American Art Museum in 2023

Art historian Richard J. Powell wrote in 1997 about the position of Thomas and Sam Gilliam as the two best known African-American members of the Washington Color School, "While conversant with the works of fellow Washington Color School artists (Gene Davis, Morris Louis, and Kenneth Noland), they also addressed, through rhythmic and high key color abstract painting techniques, the social aspirations of Washington D.C.'s African-American middle class." He continued by noting that in the 1960s Thomas "turned her back" on her earlier representational style "that would have been seen by D.C.'s arts community as ideologically conservative," in favor of "an abstract style inspired by horticulture, scientific color theory, and music." Powell described Thomas's 1976 Azeleas Singing and Dancing Rock and Roll Music as "skillfully negotiating the slippery pathways between nature and society," and "epitomize[ing] the integrationist mood of the times." The Washington Post described her as "a force in the Washington Color School".

Writing in 1998, art historian Sharon Patton described Thomas's 1973 Wind and Crepe Myrtle Concerto as "one of the most Minimalist Color-Field paintings ever produced by an African-American artist."

Although Thomas did not receive a monograph until 1998 when the Fort Wayne Museum exhibited a retrospective on the artist, the lateness of in-depth scholarly attention is not representative of her legacy and influence on the realm of Visual Arts. Jacob Kainen, her teacher at American University in autumn 1957, asserts that "Thomas played a key role in the development of abstract painting throughout the mid 20th century." Kainen wrote in the catalog of the Fort Wayne show that he met Thomas in 1943, at an event at the Barnett-Aden Gallery. Kainen remembers her at that time as "a small, slim woman whose elegance of dress and manner and unmistakable firmness of character made the matter of her size irrelevant." In the program of the 1966 Howard University Art Gallery's show "Alma W. Thomas: A Retrospective Exhibition, 1959-1966," Kainen is quoted as describing her as "the Signac of current color painters."

In 2009, two paintings by Thomas, including Watusi (Hard Edge), were chosen by First Lady Michelle Obama, White House interior designer Michael S. Smith (interior designer), and White House curator William Allman to be exhibited in the White House during the Obama presidency. Watusi (Hard Edge) was eventually removed from the White House due to concerns about the piece fitting into the space in Michelle Obama's East Wing office. Sky Light, on loan from the Hirshhorn Museum and Sculpture Garden, hung in the Obama family private quarters.

Resurrection (1966) at the Smithsonian American Art Museum in 2023

In 2015, another of her paintings, Resurrection (1966), was prominently hung in the Old Family Dining Room of the White House, having been acquired for the White House collection in 2014 with $290,000 in funding from the White House Historical Association. It was "the first artwork by an African-American woman to hang in the public spaces of the White House and enter the permanent collection." The choice of Thomas for the White House collection was described as an ideal symbol for the Obama administration by The New York Times art critic Holland Cotter. Cotter described Thomas' work as "forward-looking without being radical; post-racial but also race-conscious."

In 2016, the exhibition Alma Thomas, described in promotional materials as "the first comprehensive look at the artist's work in nearly twenty years," and as presenting "a wide range of evolution of Thomas's work from the late 1950s to her death in 1978" was organized by The Frances Young Tang Teaching Museum and Art Gallery at Skidmore College and The Studio Museum in Harlem. This exhibition was curated by Ian Berry, Dayton Director of the Tang Museum and Lauren Haynes, Associate Curator, Permanent Collection at the Studio Museum in Harlem and supported by the Friends of the Tang. The exhibit's promotional material noted that "Thomas's patterned compositions, energetic brushwork and commitment to color created a singular and innovative body of work." They also noted that it "includes rarely exhibited watercolors and early experiments." This exhibition was divided into four sections: Move to Abstraction; Earth, Space, and Late Work.

The Wall Street Journal described her in 2016 as a previously "underappreciated artist" who is more recently recognized for her "exuberant" works, noteworthy for their pattern, rhythm and color.

In 2019, Thomas's 1970 painting A Fantastic Sunset was auctioned at a Christie's sale. It sold for $2.655 million.

In 2021, a new record price was set for Thomas's work when Alma's Flower Garden, painted in approximately 1968 to 1970, was deaccessioned by the Greenville County Museum of Art, which sold it in a private sale to an unidentified purchaser for $2.8 million. The museum had bought the painting in 2008 for $135,000.

Thomas' work was included in the 2021 exhibition Women in Abstraction at the Centre Pompidou.

An exhibition of her art entitled "Alma W. Thomas: Everything is Beautiful," co-organized by the Chrysler Museum of Art in Norfolk, Virginia and the Columbus Museum in Columbus, Georgia, opened on July 9, 2021, at the Chrysler Museum. It was scheduled to run there until October 3, 2021, following which it ran at the Phillips Collection in Washington, D.C., in fall 2021, the Frist Art Museum in Nashville in spring 2022, and the Columbus Museum in summer 2022.

A short documentary, Miss Alma Thomas: A Life in Color, was commissioned in collaboration with the exhibition. Directed by Cheri Gaulke and produced by Jon Gann, it has played over 40 film festivals worldwide and has won awards and accolades.

In 2023 her work was included in the exhibition Action, Gesture, Paint: Women Artists and Global Abstraction 1940-1970 at the Whitechapel Gallery in London.

== Notable exhibitions ==
- Watercolors by Alma Thomas, 1960, Dupont Theatre Art Gallery
- Alma Thomas: A Retrospective Exhibition (1959-1966), 1966, Howard University Gallery of Art
- Alma Thomas: Recent Paintings, 1968, Franz Bader Gallery
- Recent Paintings by Alma W. Thomas: Earth and Space Series (1961–1971), 1971, Carl Van Vechten Gallery, Fisk University
- Alma W. Thomas, 1972, Whitney Museum of American Art
- Alma W. Thomas: Retrospective Exhibition, 1972, Corcoran Gallery of Art
- Alma W. Thomas: Paintings, 1973, Martha Jackson Gallery
- Alma W. Thomas: Recent Paintings, 1975, Howard University Gallery of Art
- Alma W. Thomas: Recent Paintings, 1976, H.C. Taylor Art Gallery, North Carolina Agricultural and Technical State University
- A Life in Art: Alma Thomas, 1891-1978, 1981, National Museum of American Art, Smithsonian Institution
- Alma W. Thomas: A Retrospective of the Paintings, 1998, Fort Wayne Museum of Art, Tampa Museum of Art, New Jersey State Museum, Anacostia Community Museum, Smithsonian Institution, and The Columbus Museum
- Alma Thomas: Phantasmagoria, Major Paintings from the 1970s, 2001, Michael Rosenfeld Gallery, and Women's Museum: An Institution for the Future
- A Proud Continuum: Eight Decades of Art at Howard University, 2005, Howard University
- Color Balance: Paintings by Felrath Hines and Alma Thomas, 2010, Nasher Museum of Art
- Alma Thomas, 2016, The Frances Young Tang Teaching Museum and Art Gallery at Skidmore College, and The Studio Museum in Harlem
- Alma Thomas: Resurrection Exhibition, 2019, Mnuchin Gallery
- Alma W. Thomas: Everything is Beautiful, 2021, Chrysler Museum of Art
- Composing Color: Paintings by Alma Thomas, 2023-2024, Smithsonian American Art Museum; traveled to Denver Art Museum (2024-2025), Memorial Art Gallery (2025), Indianapolis Museum of Art at Newfields (2025) and Smith College Museum of Art (2026-2027)

== Notable works in public collections ==
- Watusi (Hard Edge) (1963), Hirshhorn Museum and Sculpture Garden, Smithsonian Institution, Washington, D.C.
- Air View of a Spring Nursery (1966), Columbus Museum, Georgia
- Breeze Rustling Through Fall Flowers (1968), Phillips Collection, Washington, D.C.
- Nature's Red Impressions (1968), Luther W. Brady Art Gallery, George Washington University, Washington, D.C.
- Resurrection (1968), White House Historical Association, Washington, D.C.
- Wind, Sunshine and Flowers (1968), Brooklyn Museum, New York
- Iris, Tulips, Jonquils and Crocuses (1969), National Museum of Women in the Arts, Washington, D.C.
- Pansies in Washington (1969), National Gallery of Art, Washington, D.C.
- Lunar Surface (1970), American University Museum, Washington, D.C.
- Snoopy Early Sun Display (1970), Smithsonian American Art Museum, Smithsonian Institution, Washington, D.C.
- Earth Sermon - Beauty, Love and Peace (1971), Hirshhorn Museum and Sculpture Garden, Smithsonian Institution, Washington, D.C.
- Evening Glow (1972), Baltimore Museum of Art
- Mars Dust (1972), Whitney Museum, New York
- Red Atmosphere (1972), Tougaloo College, Jackson, Mississippi
- Red Roses Sonata (1972), Metropolitan Museum of Art, New York
- Starry Night and the Astronauts (1972), Art Institute of Chicago
- Fiery Sunset (1973), Museum of Modern Art, New York
- Spring Embraces Yellow (1973), University of Iowa Stanley Museum of Art, Iowa City
- Wind and Crêpe Myrtle Concerto (1973), Smithsonian American Art Museum, Smithsonian Institution, Washington, D.C.
- Wind Sparkling Dew and Green Grass (1973), Fort Wayne Museum of Art, Indiana
- Hydrangeas Spring Song (1976), Philadelphia Museum of Art
- Red Azaleas Singing and Dancing Rock and Roll Music (1976), Smithsonian American Art Museum, Smithsonian Institution, Washington, D.C.
- White Roses Sing and Sing (1976), Smithsonian American Art Museum, Smithsonian Institution, Washington, D.C.
- Untitled: Music Series (1978), Smithsonian American Art Museum, Smithsonian Institution, Washington, D.C.

== Memorials ==
Alma Thomas Teen Space at the Martin Luther King Jr. Memorial Library was named after her.

== Bibliography ==
- Patton, Sharon F. African-American Art. Oxford: Oxford University Press (1998). ISBN 978-01-92842-13-8
- "Alma Thomas papers, 1894-2000". Finding Aid. Archives of American Art, Smithsonian Institution.
