= Willem De Looper =

American abstract painter and art curator

Willem de Looper
- Born: October 30, 1932; The Hague
- Died: January 30, 2009 (aged 76); Washington, D.C.
- Known for: Painting
- Movement: Washington Color School, Color Field painting, Post-painterly Abstraction

Willem Johan de Looper (October 30, 1932 – January 30, 2009) was an American abstract artist, and chief curator at The Phillips Collection.

== Life ==
Willem de Looper, born October 30, 1932, was the third child of Wilhelmina Johanna and Henri Bastiaan de Looper. He grew up in The Hague and had a Montessori education. During the German occupation of the Netherlands during World War II, the family moved three times, once settling with a family friend who was a musician. This started a lifelong love of music that would later influence de Looper's visual art. As the war ended and American publications, like The New Yorker, Saturday Evening Post, and Life became available, de Looper immersed himself in their content and spent a great deal of time copying the illustrations. He also developed a fascination with and love of America and American culture.

In 1950, at age 17, de Looper immigrated to Washington, D.C., joining his older brother Hans who worked at the International Monetary Fund. He started an undergraduate education in business and economics and then changed his major to art. At American University de Looper studied with Robert Gates, Sarah Marindah Baker, and Ben Summerford. (De Looper considered Summerford his greatest mentor.) De Looper continued to live with his brother during his university years and his brother financed his education. He traveled frequently home to visit his parents as well as Dutch art museums. After graduating from American University in 1957, de Looper served two years in the United States Army in Germany at Flak-Kaserne Ludwigsburg as a clerk typist following basic training at Fort Jackson, South Carolina.

During his tour in Europe, in 1958, he attended the Brussels World's Fair and saw Abstract Expressionist paintings for the first time in the American Pavilion. He traveled as much as he could throughout the continent to see art and collected and studied art magazines and journals. He also married during this time, Lili Mentrop, a childhood friend, but the marriage was brief.

After returning from the Army in 1959, de Looper worked as a museum guard for the Phillips Collection. He claimed that during 1962–1963, he filled a notebook with watercolors influenced by Phillips Collection artists such as Paul Klee, John Marin, and Arthur Dove. He experimented with styles and processes of the Color Field artists (rolling, pouring, and staining with paint.) In the 1960s, he exhibited his work at the Franz Bader Gallery, International Monetary Fund, Society of Washington Artists, and Jefferson Place Gallery.

In 1966, de Looper had his first solo exhibition at the Jefferson Place Gallery in Washington, DC. The gallery would go on to host solo exhibitions of his work every year through 1974.After his second marriage in 1969 to Frauke Weber, the couple moved into the St. Regis building on California Street in Northwest Washington D.C. where he finally had a large studio space, which brought on a period of working on larger canvases. De Looper continued pursuing his career as an artist while working for the Philips Collection, and became assistant curator in 1972, then curator at the museum from 1982 - 1987.

De Looper has shown at many established galleries and museums such as The National Gallery of Art, The Phillips Collection, Smithsonian American Art Museum, Hirshhorn Museum and Sculpture Garden and Corcoran Gallery of Art. The Phillips Collection hosted solo shows of his work in 1975 and 2002.

He died January 30, 2009, of emphysema.

== Exhibitions ==
- 2008 American University Art Museum
- 2002 The Phillips Collection
- 1996 The Art Gallery at the University of Maryland
- 1966 Jefferson Place Gallery
