= Robert W. Newmann =

American painter, sculptor (born 1944)

- Born: 1944 (age 80–81); Nyack, New York, U.S.
- Occupation(s): painter, sculptor
- Movement: Washington Color School

Robert W. Newmann (born 1944) is an American painter and sculptor. He was a member of the Washington Color School art movement. In his early career he painted canvas and transitioned in his late career to working in sculpture and installation art.

== Biography ==
Robert W. Newmann was born in 1944 in Nyack, New York. He attended Rochester Institute of Technology, the University of Iowa, and the Corcoran College of Art and Design.

In 1984, Newmann was part of a New York lawsuit, Newmann vs. Delmar Realty Co. over the completion of a New York City mural sandblasted on the side of a brick wall at the Palladium. The lawsuit was notable for establishing artists legal rights in the case of defaced public artwork. Using a recently enacted New York law that safeguards artists' rights, a Manhattan State Supreme Court judge ordered the Palladium's owners to let Newmann complete the mural. Judge Elliott Wilk found that leaving the artwork unfinished harmed Newmann's reputation and violated the state's Artists' Authorship Rights Act.

Newmann's work is included in the public museum collection at the Smithsonian American Art Museum.
