= Kenneth Victor Young =

American artist (1933–2017)

- Born: December 12, 1933; Louisville, Kentucky, U.S.
- Died: March 12, 2017 (aged 83); Washington, D.C., U.S.
- Resting place: Arlington National Cemetery
- Other names: Ken Young, Kenneth Young, Kenneth V. Young
- Education: University of Louisville
- Occupations: painter, educator, designer, exhibit designer
- Movement: Washington Color School
- Spouse: Morrissa Elizabeth Foley

Kenneth Victor Young (1933–2017), was an American artist, educator, and designer. He is associated with the Washington Color School art movement. He worked at the Smithsonian Institution as an exhibit designer for 35 years.

== Early life and education ==
Kenneth Victor Young was born on December 12, 1933, in Louisville, Kentucky, into an African American family.

He attended the University of Louisville to study design and physics, followed by additional study at Indiana University and University of Hawai'i. While attending University of Louisville, he met fellow student Sam Gilliam, as well as G. Caliman Coxe, and Bob Thompson. In the 1950s, Young served in the United States Navy.

== Career ==
Young briefly worked at DuPont chemical in Louisville, and in moved in 1964 to Washington, D.C., for a new job role as an exhibit designer at the Smithsonian Institution. He was the first Black exhibit designer at Smithsonian Institution. He worked in the evenings as a designer for the United States Information Agency. He was able to travel during this time of his career; visiting Egypt, Italy, and various locations in Africa. While working at the Smithsonian Institution, he was on a project alongside Jacob Kainen and they became friends.

Eventually, he met many of the other Washington Color School painters, possibly through Kainen or in informal associations. There are conflicting dates for when Young started his painting career. By 1960, he was dedicated to painting. His first museum solo exhibit was, Ken Young: Recent Paintings (1974) at the Corcoran Gallery of Art.

Young's paintings were abstract and often featured multiple colored wash strokes. His paintings were large scale in acrylic paint, very bright and colorful. Some of the titles of his paintings are referenced to jazz music.

He taught art at Corcoran School of the Arts and Design, and at the Duke Ellington School of the Arts.

== Death and legacy ==
Young died on March 12, 2017, in Washington, D.C. He is buried at Arlington National Cemetery.

== Collections ==
Young's work is included in public museum collections, including the National Gallery of Art, Corcoran Gallery of Art, the Pérez Art Museum Miami, and the Smithsonian American Art Museum. Young's work was once part of the historic Johnson Publishing Company art collection, the parent company of Ebony and Jet magazines.

The Johnson Publishing Company art collection had consisted of 75 African American artists artwork that had once hung in the offices, but due to bankruptcy the artworks went to auction in January 2020.
