= James Hilleary =

American architect and painter

James Frances Hilleary
- Born: January 24, 1924; Washington, DC
- Died: April 10, 2014 (aged 90); Bethesda, Maryland
- Movement: Washington Color School
- Spouse: Margaret "Peggy" Hilleary
- Website: jameshilleary.com

James Frances Hilleary (January 21, 1924 – April 10, 2014) was a working architect and painter who gained prominence as a member of the Washington Color School movement.

== Biography ==
James Hilleary was a native Washingtonian.

In 1942, Hilleary graduated from Gonzaga High School in Washington, D.C., after which he was immediately drafted into the Army. After his military service, he enrolled at Catholic University. Hilleary had a passion for music and art throughout his life, having spent countless hours at the Phillips Collection while his father, who was also a musician and artist, studied art there under C. Law Watkins. Accordingly, Hilleary double-majored in music and architecture, graduating in 1950 with a Bachelor's degree in architecture.

After graduation, Hilleary went into the private practice of architecture and remained a principal at his own firm until joining Rysson Maryland Corporation in 1976. Hilleary served on the executive committee of the Potomac Valley Chapter of the American Institute of Architects, wrote extensively for local and national publications, and was the recipient of several local and national awards for design excellence.

Though Hilleary had started a career as an architect, painting had been his passion since childhood. Therefore, Hilleary began creating the paintings like those that he loved but could never afford.

He was married to Margaret Keirn, the daughter of Brig. Gen. Donald J. Keirn, and had children Cecily, Leslie, Sidonie, and Keirn.

== Critical recognition ==
Hilleary was associated with the Washington Color School. His work follows the general nature of color-field painting but is largely concerned with the manipulation of sequential stripes.

Hilleary received critical acclaim throughout his career. Early in his career, the art critic Barbara Rose lauded Hilleary's "assured geometric abstractions" in an article in Artforum magazine, while The Washingtonian called his work "particularly promising". Late in his career, the prominent art critic and professor Donald Kuspit described Hilleary as a "master of color". And Washington Post art critic Paul Richard said that Hilleary was "admired enthusiastically by some of the smartest art minds in town."

Hilleary "is best known for his commitment to creating harmonious, expertly executed canvases in variations of a signature style." His signature style revolved around his "interest[] in patterns as well as colors—patterns not simply as decorative displays of color, but as on intricate arrangement of what the Futurists called lines of force." Despite the centrality of lines and angles to his work, though, Hilleary has been described as a Lyrical Abstractionist artist. That description may reflect the evolution of his art. Washington Post art critic Benjamin Forgey observed that Hilleary "at first adopted the then-reigning hard-edge format utilizing relatively subdued optical color combinations" but over time his work evolved to show a "gradual release of lyrical energies, in which softer colors and thin, translucent overlays of paint have been added to the logical structure of interlocking vertical and diagonal stripes."

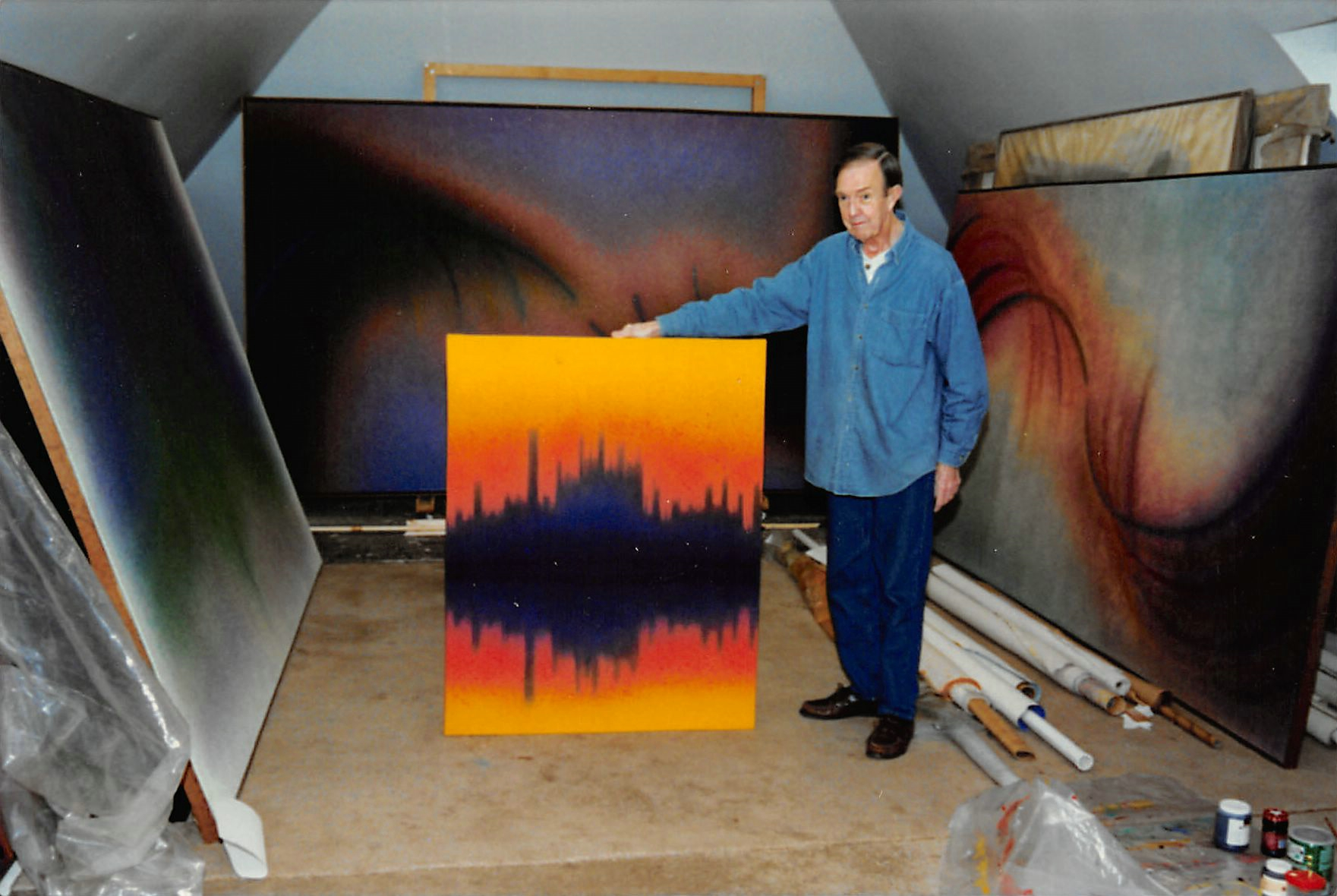
James Hilleary in his Studio with one of his Reflections Series works

Hilleary's work is found in numerous museums, including the Smithsonian American Art Museum, the Phillips Collection, the Corcoran Gallery of Art, and the Museo de Arte Contemporaneo de Buenos Aires.

Arts foundations and corporate collections that hold Hilleary's work include the Carl & Marilynn Thoma Art Foundation, Sallie Mae, Freddie Mac, the United States Federal Reserve Bank, IBM, PricewaterhouseCoopers, KPMG, and Gibson, Dunn & Crutcher.

Hilleary's work is also found in important private collections across the globe, including the collection of prominent art historian Linda Nochlin.

Hilleary has been the subject of three major retrospectives:

- James Hilleary: Painting Retrospective at Edison Place Gallery in Washington, DC (November 1, 2003)
- James Hilleary: A Retrospective at Peyton-Wright Gallery in Santa Fe (July 2012)
- Modernism: James Hilleary and Color at the University of Maryland University College, an exhibition which included a full-day symposium on his work (December 2012).

== Bibliography ==
- Art Forum Magazine: "Washington Scene" (November 1967) ("...Other works worth mentioning were James Hilleary's assured geometric abstraction....")
- Art Forum Magazine: "Gloom on the Potomac" by Joanna Eagle, Washington Editor (1968)
- Washington Star: "Washington's Artists: A Personal Choice" by Benjamin Forgey, reviewing "Loan Exhibition of Washington Artists" at the Phillips Collection (April 6, 1968)
- Washington Daily News: "Pianist-Architect Unbalances Stripes," reviewing Hilleary's solo exhibition at Henri Gallery (April 10, 1968)
- Washington Star: "ART: Harmonious Paintings" by Benjamin Forgey reviewing a group show at Studio Gallery (March 1, 1970)
- Washington Star: "ART: Somehow, it Just Doesn't Seem Enough", a review by Benjamin Forgey of Hilleary's exhibition at Studio Gallery (December 5, 1971)
- Washington Star-News: "Art Gallery Roundup: More Abstractions Than Excitement" by Benjamin Forgey (April 7, 1974)
- Washington Post: "Galleries" by Paul Richard (April 12, 1976)
- Washington Post: "James Hilleary" by Benjamin Forgey (February 12, 1978)
- Washington Times Magazine: "James Hilleary: A Colorist of Formidable Ability Plays Dual Role as Both Artist and Architect" (a lengthy cover article in the Washington Times Magazine regarding Hilleary) (December 6, 1985)
- Washington Post: "Critics' Picks / Art" review (June 4, 1989)
- Art in America: "James Hilleary at Gregory" by David Ebony (November 1, 1996)
- Georgetowner: "James Hilleary at Susan Conway Gallery" review by Georgia Shallcross (reviewing an exhibition of Hilleary's Petal Series at the Susan Conway Gallery) (April 10, 1997)
- Washington Post: "Strathmore Reopens" (September 10, 1997)
- Washington Post: "Color School Graduate" review by Ferdinand Protzman (October 9, 1997)
- Washington Post: "Deck the Walls at Susan Conway" by Ferdinand Protzman (December 9, 1999)
- Potomac Gazette: "On View" review by Nancy Ungar (February 21, 2001)
- Washington Post: "Color School PhD" by Jessica Dawson reviewing "James Hilleary at Edison Place" (November 20, 2003)
- Washington Post: "Holston and Hilleary: Even Better with Age" by Michael O'Sullivan (December 12, 2003) (lengthy article describing Hilleary's work)
- Acquisitions, Board of Governors of the Federal Reserve System (2012)
- Jean Lawler Cohen et al., Washington Art Matters: Art Life in the Capital 1940-1990 (Washington Arts Museum, 2013)
- Where Traveler: "James Hilleary at D.C.'s Heurich Gallery" (December 11, 2013)
- Washington City Paper: "Color, Full: A Timeline of the Washington Color School" by Kriston Capps (June 2, 2017)

== Group Shows ==
- Group Show at Henri Gallery, Alexandria, Virginia (1966)
- Group Show at Henri Gallery, Washington, DC (1967)
- The 18th Area Exhibition at the Corcoran Gallery of Art, Washington, DC (November 1967)
- 1969 Maryland Regional at the Baltimore Museum of Art (May 1969)
- 1970 Maryland Annual at the Baltimore Museum of Art (May 1970)
- New Members at Studio Gallery, Washington, DC (March 1970)
- 50th Anniversary Exhibition at the Phillips Collection, Washington, DC (December 1971)
- James Hilleary and Kenneth Victor Young: Two From Washington at the AM Sachs Gallery, New York City (June 1972)
- 19th Area Exhibition of the Corcoran Gallery of Art, Washington, DC (October 1974)
- Architects as Artists at the Art Barn, Washington, DC (1975)
- Group show at Studio Gallery, Washington, DC (1976)
- Anniversary Show at the Washington Project for the Arts, Washington, DC (1977)
- Washington Artists: From the Barbara Fiedler Gallery at the Pavilion of Fine Arts at Montgomery College (November 1979)
- The Way We Were at Studio Gallery, Washington, DC (September 1983)
- A Tribute to Washington Area Artists at Freddie Mac (1988)
- New Works (3-person show) at the Susan Conway Carroll Gallery, Washington, DC (January 1989)
- Thirty Years Later at Gallery K, Washington, DC (June 1989)
- Former Member Show at Studio Gallery, Washington, DC (1990)
- Art in the Embassies Program at the American Embassy in Lisbon, Portugal (1990–1992)
- Washington Project for the Arts 13th Annual Art Auction (November 1992)
- Small Treasures at the Susan Conway Gallery in Washington, DC (December 1996)
- Group Show at the Gregory Gallery, New York City (1996)
- Survey (7-person show) at the Susan Conway Gallery, Washington, DC (December 1997)
- Paintings and Works on Paper (6-person show) at the Gregory Gallery, New York City (September 1998)
- 3 Painters at Rockville Arts Space in Maryland (March 2001)
- Deck the Walls 2001: Art in the American Genre at the Susan Conway Gallery in Washington, DC (December 2001)
- Explorers: 3 Painters at Rockville Art Place, Rockville, Maryland (March 2001)
- Group Show at Susan Conway Gallery, Washington, DC
- Santa Fe, Summer 2008 at Osuna Art, Bethesda, Maryland (June 2008)
- Summer 2010 Exhibitions at the American University Museum, Washington, DC (June 2010)
- Washington Color School: 50 Years Later at Bethesda Fine Arts (Oct 2017)
- Full Circle: Hue and Saturation in the Washington Color School at the Luther W. Brady Art Gallery of the George Washington University Art Galleries (June 2018)
- Selections from the Artery Collection at the American University Museum (September 2018)

== Solo Shows ==
- James Hilleary: Paintings & Sculpture at Henri Gallery, Washington, DC (April 1968)
- James Hilleary: Recent Paintings at Studio Gallery, Washington, DC (November 1971)
- Afterimages: Paintings by James Hilleary at Studio Gallery, Washington, DC (March 1974)
- James Hilleary: Alta Series, Paintings and Drawings at Studio Gallery, Washington, DC (March 1976)
- James Hilleary at Barbara Fiedler Gallery, Washington, DC (February 1978)
- James Hilleary: 1965–1977: A Twelve Year Review of Paintings at Studio Gallery, Washington, DC (1978)
- Paintings by James Hilleary at Marlboro Gallery, Largo, Maryland (September 1978)
- James Hilleary: Recent Paintings at the Barbara Fiedler Gallery, Washington, DC (October 1979)
- James Hilleary at Susan Conway Gallery, Washington, DC (February 1988)
- James Hilleary: Abstractionist Abroad at the Susan Conway Gallery, Washington, DC (October 1989)
- James Hilleary: Small Drawings and Table-top Sculpture at Susan Conway Gallery, Washington, DC (April 1994)
- James Hilleary: Paintings and Works on Paper at Gregory Gallery, New York City (March 1996)
- James Hilleary: Petal Series at Susan Conway Gallery, Washington, DC (April 1997)
- Hilleary at Strathmore at Strathmore Hall, Bethesda, Maryland (September 1997)
- James Hilleary: Painting Retrospective at Edison Place Gallery, Washington, DC (November 2003)
- James Hilleary: Recent Work at Osuna Art, Bethesda, Maryland (October 2007)
- James Hillleary: A Retrospective at Peyton-Wright Gallery, Santa Fe (July 2012)
- Modernism: James Hilleary and Color at the University of Maryland University College (December 2012)
