= Sarah Baker (painter) =

American painter

Sarah Marinda Baker (1899–1983) was an American painter.

== Education ==
A native of Memphis, Tennessee, Baker studied at the Maryland Institute College of Art in Baltimore and had lessons with Hugh Breckenridge, Arthur Charles, and André Lhote. She also studied with Pierre Bonnard.

== Career ==
=== Teaching ===
She was active as a teacher at the Bryn Mawr School for Girls in Baltimore, from 1929 to 1937; St. Timothy's School in Catonsville, from 1931 to 1945; and American University, from 1945 to 1983.

=== Painting ===
In 1935 she received a prize from the Washington Society of Independent Artists, and in 1945 she received one from the Baltimore Museum of Art; in 1926 she won a fellowship gold medal from the Pennsylvania Academy of the Fine Arts. The Brooklyn Museum and the Phillips Collection are among museums holding examples of Baker's work. Among her pupils was Willem De Looper. Baker's papers are housed at the Archives of American Art at the Smithsonian Institution.
