= Mountains and Sea =

1952 painting by Helen Frankenthaler

- Artist: Helen Frankenthaler
- Year: 1952
- Medium: Oil and charcoal on canvas
- Movement: Abstract Expressionism, Color Field painting, Lyrical Abstraction
- Dimensions: 220 cm × 297.8 cm (87 in × 117.2 in)
- Location: National Gallery of Art; Washington, D.C.
- Owner: Helen Frankenthaler Foundation, Inc.
- Website: nga.gov/audio-video/audio/collection-highlights-east-building-english/mountains-and-sea-frankenthaler.html%20National%20Gallery%20of%20Art

Mountains and Sea is a 1952 painting by American abstract expressionist painter Helen Frankenthaler. Painted when Frankenthaler was 23 years old, it was her first professionally exhibited work. Though initially panned by critics, Mountains and Sea later became her most influential and best known canvas.

== Background ==
In 1950, Frankenthaler was exposed to the work of Jackson Pollock for the first time during an exhibition at the Betty Parsons Gallery where several of Pollock's paintings, Autumn Rhythm, Number 30, 1950 (1950), and Number One, 1950 (Lavender Mist) (1950), were displayed. She was intrigued by the idea of painting a canvas lying flat on the floor, and would later employ that technique for Mountains and Sea.

In the summer of 1952, Frankenthaler went on a road trip to Cape Breton Island, Nova Scotia, during which she painted landscapes there using foldable easel equipment. Mountains and Sea was painted after this trip, and while the painting is not a direct depiction of a coastline in Nova Scotia, it contains elements that suggest a kind of seascape or landscape, such as the strokes of blue that join with areas of green.

== Description ==
The New York Times described Mountains and Sea as, "a light-struck, diaphanous evocation of hills, rocks and water," and the artist herself later said the canvas, "look[s] to many people like a large paint rag, casually accidental and incomplete.”

To create Mountains and Sea, Frankenthaler placed an unprimed canvas directly onto the floor and stained color directly onto it by diluting oil paint with turpentine and allowing the colors to bleed. It was the first time she used this stain technique.

== Influence ==
Mountains and Sea is considered an important precursor to color field painting and has been described as, "the Rosetta stone of color-field." The canvas's impact on the color field movement has been compared to the importance of Claude Monet's Impression, Sunrise to the Impressionist movement. Morris Louis, an abstract expressionist painter and a contemporary of Frankenthaler, described the painting as, "a bridge between Pollock and what was possible."

The 1980 BBC series 100 Great Paintings featured Mountains and Sea.

The painting is on extended loan to the National Gallery of Art in Washington, D.C.
