= Jacob Kainen =

American painter and printmaker

- Olivia Harrison and Jacob Kainen, 1997 by Carol Harrison
- Born: 1909; Waterbury, Connecticut
- Died: 2001; Chevy Chase, Maryland
- Known for: Painting, printmaking, curator
- Movement: Genre Scene, Pure abstraction, Abstract Expressionist, Figurative, Totemic, Geometric Abstraction, Lyrical Abstraction

Jacob Kainen (December 7, 1909 – March 19, 2001) was an American painter and printmaker. He is also known as an art historian, writing books on John Baptist Jackson (US Government Printing Office, Washington, DC, 1962) and the etchings of Canaletto (Smithsonian Press, Washington, DC, 1967). In addition, Kainen was a collector of German Expressionist art, and he and his second wife, Ruth, donated a collection of this work to the National Gallery of Art in 1985.

== Biography ==
Jacob Kainen was born in Waterbury, Connecticut, in 1909. As the second of three sons born to Russian immigrants, Kainen grew up in a family that appreciated culture and talent. His father's artistry as an inventor and his mother's love for music and literature undoubtedly fostered in Kainen an insatiable interest in art. Even at age ten, Kainen was eager to study master works, including clippings of art reproductions from The Jewish Daily Forward in his scrapbooks. In 1918, the family moved to New York City, where Kainen's budding passion would further advance with trips to The Metropolitan Museum of Art and the New York Public Library. Poetry and literature became major components of his artistic study during high school. When Kainen graduated from DeWitt Clinton High School at sixteen, he was too young to be admitted to the Pratt Institute. In the meantime he took drawing classes at the Art Students League, where Kimon Nicolaides taught him to "trust in the freedom and sureness of his hand". It was during this period that Kainen made his first prints, drypoint etchings. Kainen used this time to further exercise his interests by working in the classics department of Brentano's bookstore, as well as developing his skills as a boxer. Kainen would go on to become an expert in the classics and quite a skilled amateur prizefighter.

Kainen was finally granted admittance to Pratt in the fall of 1927. Though he had a deep interest and appreciation for the old masters during this period of his life, he quickly found the Pratt curriculum backward, too anti-modernist, and dogmatic. Upon entering school his portraits and color choices remained warm in tone, but as he progressed they became brighter and more reminiscent of Cézanne's palette. In Kainen's final year of school, Pratt instituted a curriculum that focused more on commercial art and commercialized drawing styles. This catalyzed Kainen into a rebellion that resulted in his expulsion from the institute three weeks before graduation, and subjected him to further scorn from many of those associated with Pratt.

This event proved monumental in Kainen's conceptual and artistic development. After his expulsion, Kainen sought out other avant-garde artists in the city, especially those who shared his institutional disdain. It led him to begin to engage with the emotive palette and gestures of German Expressionism and the social awareness and ferocity of social realism during the 1930s. He became a part of the New York Group, "interested in those aspects of contemporary life which reflect the deepest feelings of the people; their poverty, their surroundings, their desire for peace, their fight for life." His expressionist and social leanings began to definitively merge in the mid-1930s in works such as Tenement Fire (1934) and The Flood (1936). Kainen found interest in stylistic experimentation meant to convey expressive meaning. He was a member of "The Ten", which was a group of artists who promoted Expressionist art, exhibiting together from 1935 to 1939. The group had "three goals: they sought to represent the rawest human emotions, to use paint expressively rather than descriptively, and to focus on internal experience rather than external facts".

Kainen's wrote a highly regarded and informative essay on the WPA Graphic Arts Division in a collection of essays called The New Deal Art Projects: An Anthology of Memoirs.

== Career ==
Kainen also frequented cafeterias that had become the places where urban artists met to debate and develop ideas, both social and aesthetic. Kainen and Arshile Gorky became acquainted during a particular exchange in which they both defended the importance of copying master works and admitted to lurking in museums. The friendship with Gorky and his influence that resulted from their meeting would prove to be a lifelong one. Kainen was an active participant in the WPA's graphic arts program during the second half of the decade, but he eventually parted with the aesthetics of social realism in favor of abstraction. Yet his work would never lose its humanism or its concern for history: "However abstract the forms and colors seem, they should somehow give off an aura of human experience." When opportunities in New York for work with the WPA ran low, Kainen moved to Washington, DC in 1942.

== Curator ==
From 1942 to 1970 Kainen was curator of the Division of Graphic Arts at the Smithsonian's U. S. National Museum. Though jarred by the elementary state of Washington's then slow-paced art scene, Kainen found inspiration in the Victorian skyline and architecture that defined the buildings surrounding his studio in Dupont Circle. In the 1940s he was one of the first abstract artists working in the city, and produced abstract compositions of symbols and forms that resounded with both his physical surroundings and personal experiences.

In 1949 Kainen's national loyalty was questioned and he was placed under investigation by the Civil Services loyalty board. During the 1930s, and the time spent in New York after his expulsion from Pratt, Kainen had written art reviews for the Daily Worker and signed legal petitions that attempted to institute social change. Such activities later put his job in jeopardy. Kainen was not cleared of formal charges until 1954. The psychological strain and anxiety of this period became evident in his vivid abstractions with titles like Exorcist (1952), Unmoored #2 (1952) and The Listener (1952). Kainen later remembered this time as a period when: "I begin with the aesthetic balancing of forms but these psychological ghosts take over."

Soon after his clearance by the Civil Services board, Kainen shifted from abstraction to elegant figurative work. As evidence of fervent independence, Kainen rejected the popularity of Abstract Expressionism for a return to the figure. Kainen began to participate in substantially more exhibitions in Washington after he met his wife, Ruth Cole, in 1968. Prior to their marriage Kainen painted nightly after his workday, at his unheated studio, until ten or eleven o'clock at night, then returned home to do writing or museum research until 2 a.m. because he was not allowed to do scholarly writing on government time. He retired from the Smithsonian in 1970 in order to paint full-time.

Kainen taught evening classes in painting and printmaking at the Washington Workshop Center for the Arts, and was instrumental in introducing Morris Louis to Kenneth Noland and hiring Louis to teach painting at the Workshop. Shortly thereafter, Louis and Noland began collaborating on "staining", the fundamental notion of Washington Color Field Painting, and a groundbreaking technique with many influential practitioners, although Kainen did not consider himself to be a member of the Washington Color School. After his departure from the Smithsonian Institution in 1970, Kainen's work shifted back to pure abstraction.

== Exhibitions ==
- Jacob Kainen (Retrospective). Catholic University, Washington, D.C., December, 1952; organized by Kenneth Noland.
- Jacob Kainen: Recent Paintings. Middendorf Gallery, Washington, D.C., April 9-May 7, 1988
- Jacob Kainen: Recent Drawings. Nancy Drysdale Gallery, Washington, D.C. March 23-April 29, 1995.

== Death ==
Jacob Kainen died in his home in Chevy Chase, Maryland, at the age of 91 as he was preparing to go to his studio to paint. He was the father of mathematician Paul Kainen and inventor Daniel Kainen.

== See also ==
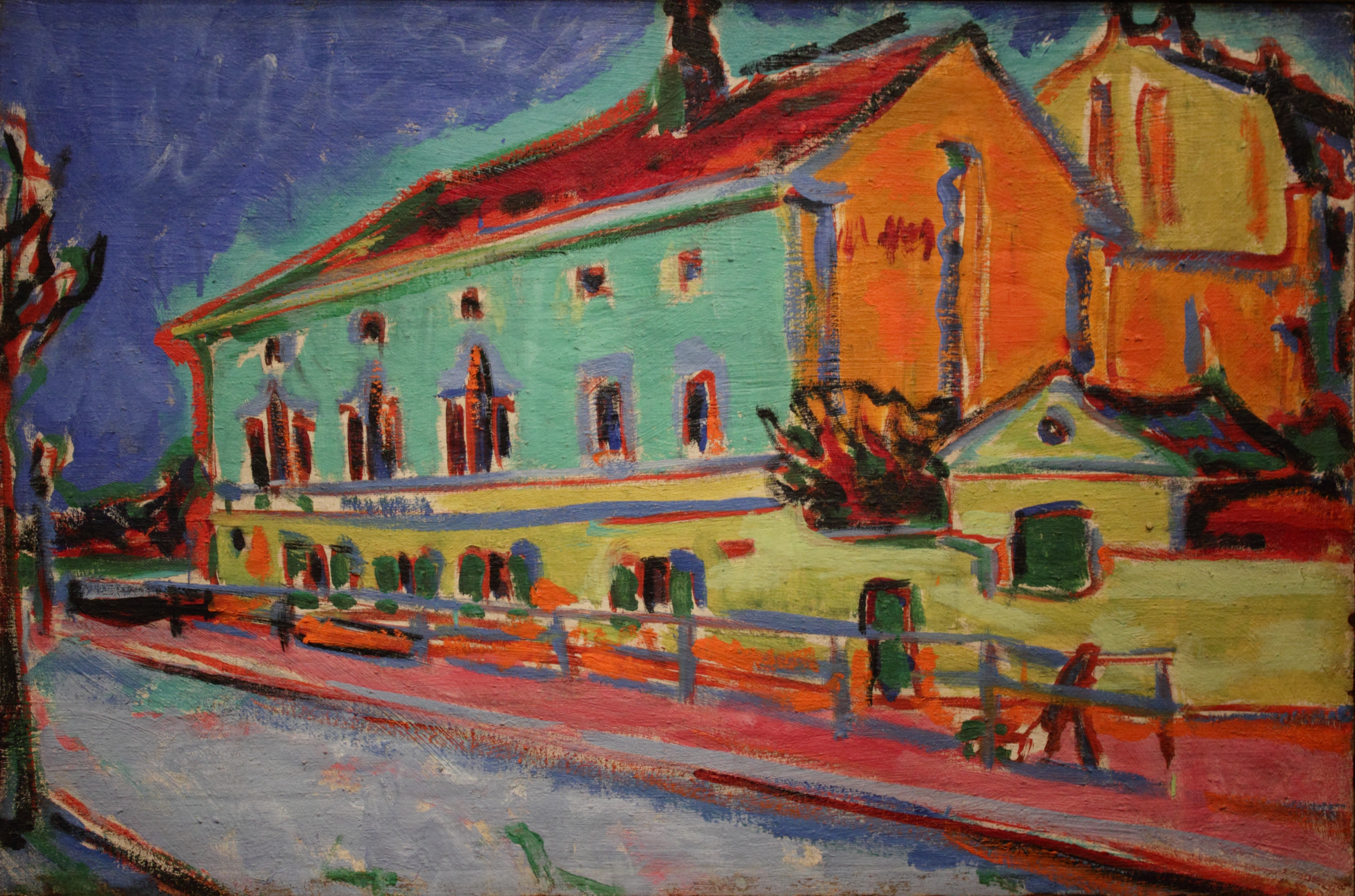
Dance Hall Bellevue (Houses in Dresden) by Ernst Ludwig Kirchner, Ruth and Jacob Kainen Collection, gift in honor of the 50th Anniversary of the National Gallery of Art

- Color Field
