= Gene Davis (painter) =

American painter (1920–1985)

- Born: August 22, 1920; Washington, DC, U.S.
- Died: April 6, 1985 (aged 64); Washington, DC, U.S.
- Education: University of Maryland
- Known for: Painting
- Movement: Washington Color School, Color Field painting, Post-painterly Abstraction

Gene Davis (August 22, 1920 – April 6, 1985) was an American Color Field painter known especially for his paintings of vertical stripes of color.

== Biography ==
Davis was born in Washington, D.C., in 1920 and spent nearly all his life there. Before he began to paint in 1949, he worked as a sportswriter, covering the Washington Football Team and other local teams. Working as a journalist in the late 1940s, he covered the Roosevelt and Truman presidential administrations, and was often President Truman's partner for poker games. His first art studio was in his apartment on Scott Circle; later he worked out of a studio on Pennsylvania Avenue. In the 1950s, Gene Davis, with Kenneth Noland and Morris Louis was one of a small group of painters called the Washington Color School who made experimentation with colours. In Washington he closely studied works in the Phillips Collection including paintings by Pierre Bonnard and Paul Klee, to which he later attributed his heightened sense of color.

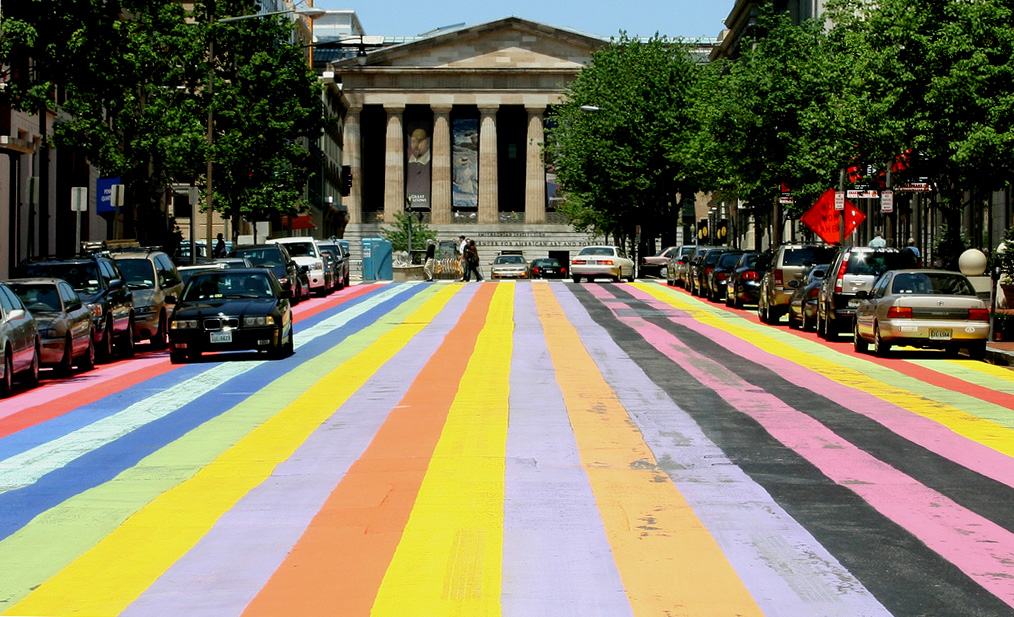
Street in downtown Washington, D.C. painted in Davis' style

Davis's first solo exhibition of drawings was at the Dupont Theater Gallery in 1952, and his first exhibition of paintings was at Catholic University in 1953. A decade later he participated in the "Washington Color Painters" exhibit at the Washington Gallery of Modern Art in Washington, D.C., which traveled to other venues around the U.S., and launched the recognition of the Washington Color School as a regional movement in which Davis was a central figure. The Washington painters were among the most prominent of the mid-century color field painters. Though, he worked in a variety of media and styles, including ink, oil, acrylic, video, and collage, Davis is best known by far for his acrylic paintings (mostly on canvas) of colorful vertical stripes, which he began to paint in 1958. The paintings typically repeat particular colors to create a sense of rhythm and repetition with variations. One of the best-known of his paintings, "Blue Freak-Out" (1966) acquired by the Pérez Art Museum Miami, and "Black Grey Beat" (1964), owned by the Smithsonian American Art Museum reinforces these musical comparisons in its title. The pairs of alternating black and grey stripes are repeated across the canvas, and recognizable even as other colors are substituted for black and grey, and returned to even as the repetition of dark and light pairs is here and there broken by sharply contrasting colors.

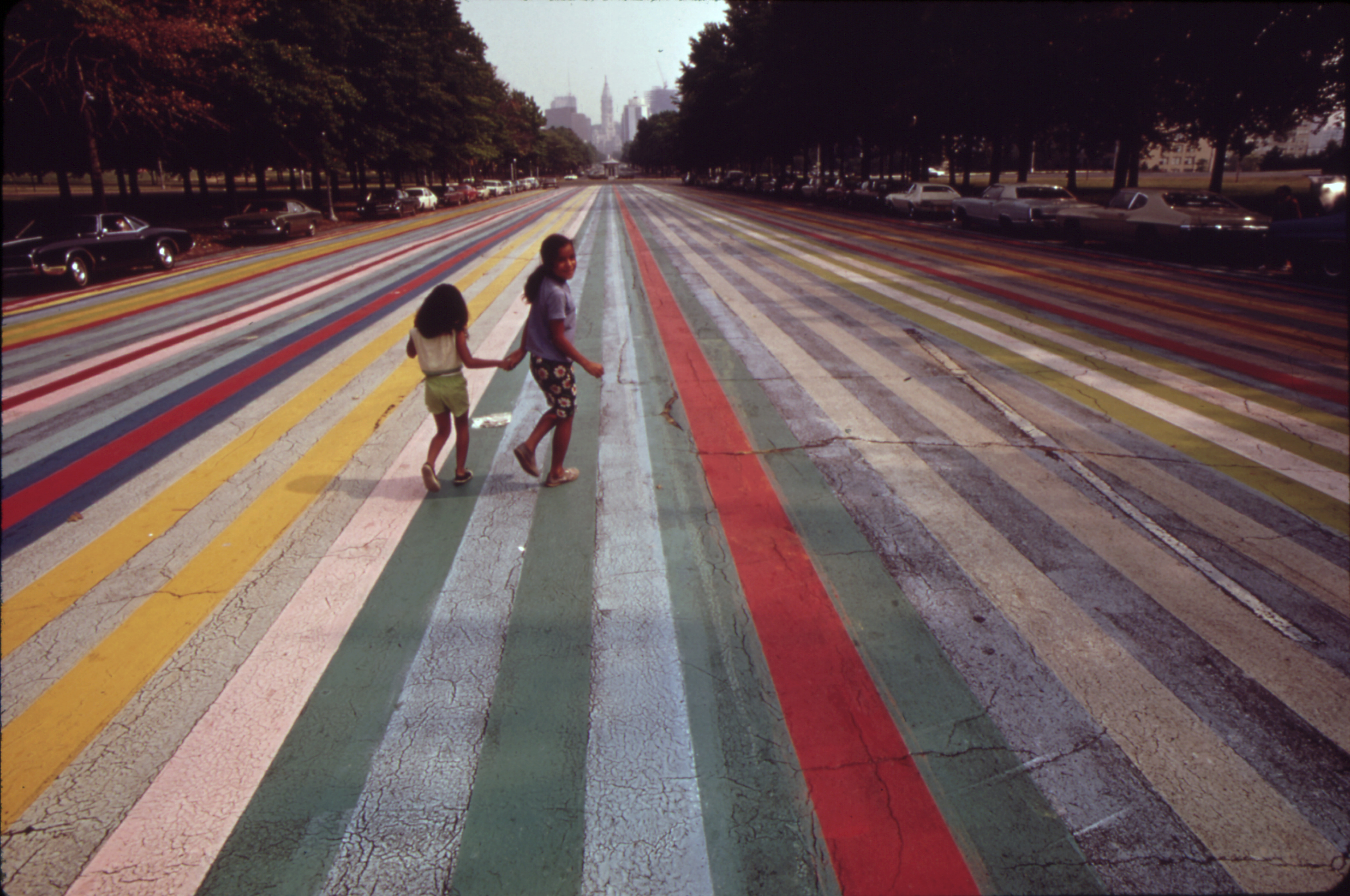
Franklin's Footpath

In 1972 Davis created Franklin's Footpath, which was at the time the world's largest artwork, by painting colorful stripes on the street in front of the Philadelphia Museum of Art, and the world's largest painting, Niagara (43,680 square feet), in a parking lot in Lewiston, New York. His "micro-paintings", at the other extreme, were as small as 3/8 of an inch square. Stripes are a recurrent theme in art history and he used it as a formal canon to examine various aspects of color using a reduced range of resources.

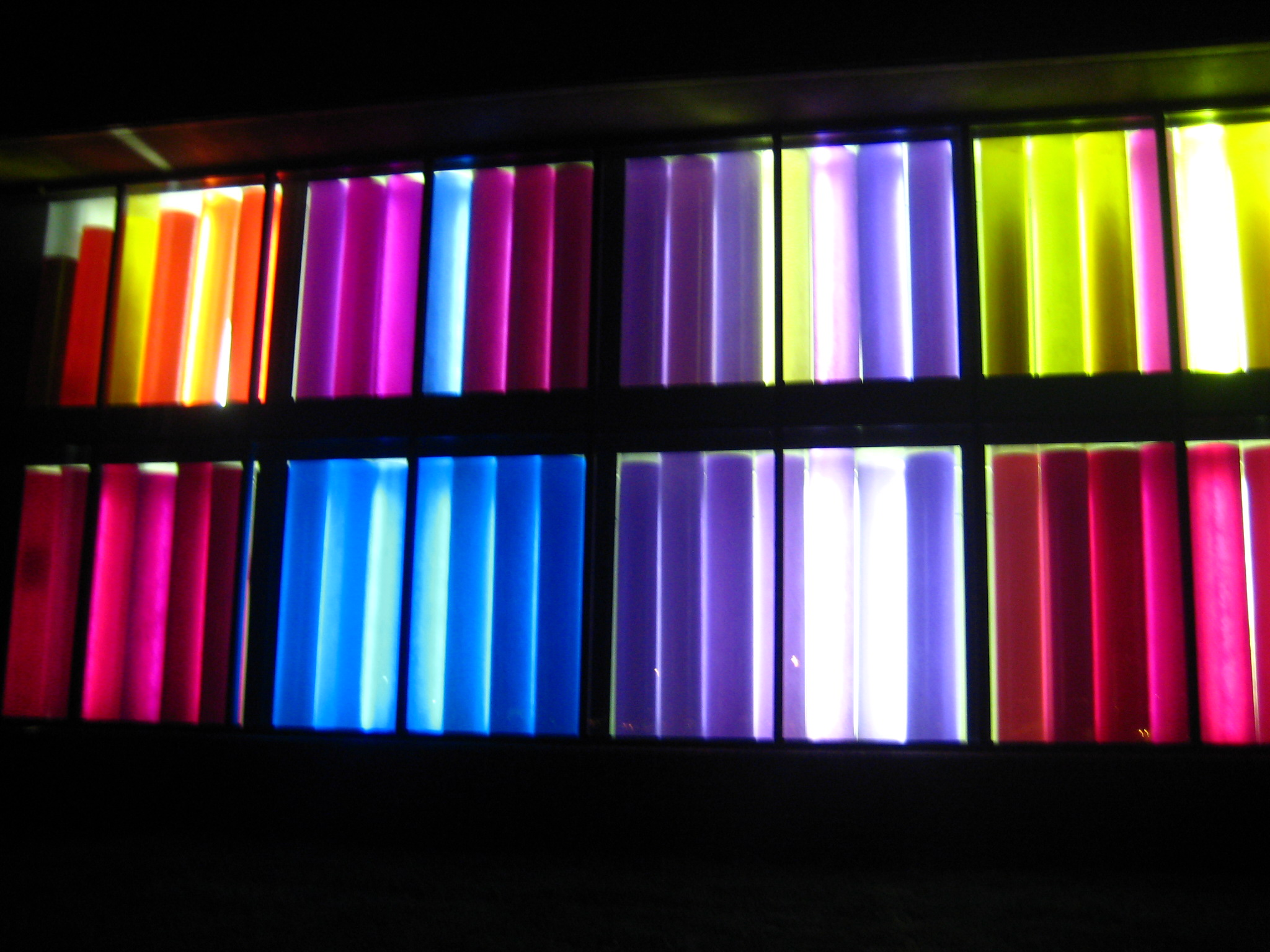
Sun Sonata by Gene Davis.

For a public work in a different medium altogether, he designed the color patterns of the "Solar Wall," a set of tubes filled with dyed water and backlit by fluorescent lights, at the Muscarelle Museum of Art at the College of William and Mary in Williamsburg, Virginia.

Davis began teaching in 1966 at the Corcoran School of Art, where he became a permanent member of the faculty. His works are in the collections of, among others, the Corcoran Gallery of Art, the Solomon R. Guggenheim Museum, The Phillips Collection in Washington, D.C., the Pérez Art Museum Miami, in Florida, the Walker Art Center in Minneapolis, Minnesota, The Governor Nelson A. Rockefeller Empire State Plaza Art Collection in Albany, New York, and the Smithsonian American Art Museum.

He died on April 6, 1985, in his hometown of Washington, DC.

== See also ==
- Color Field
- Western painting
- History of painting
- Lyrical abstraction
- Post-painterly abstraction
- Washington Color School
