= Morris Louis =

American painter (1912–1962)

- Born: Morris Louis Bernstein; November 28, 1912; Baltimore, Maryland
- Died: September 7, 1962 (aged 49); Washington, DC.
- Education: Maryland Institute College of Art
- Known for: Painting
- Movement: Color Field painting, Abstract Expressionism, Post-painterly abstraction, Washington Color School

Morris Louis Bernstein (November 28, 1912 – September 7, 1962), known professionally as Morris Louis, was an American painter. During the 1950s he became one of the earliest exponents of Color Field painting. While living in Washington, D.C., Louis, along with Kenneth Noland and other Washington painters, formed a loose cohort of artists that is known today as the Washington Color School.

Louis produced a body of work defined by large-scale canvases and innovative staining techniques using Magna acrylic paints. Between 1954 and his death in 1962, Louis developed a sequence of painting series that marked distinct stylistic phases in his artistic evolution. These major series include the Veils, Florals, Columns, Alephs, Unfurleds, and Stripe paintings. Each group illustrates Louis's deep engagement with color, form, and materiality, and collectively they represent a pioneering contribution to postwar American abstraction.

== Early life and education ==
Morris Louis Bernstein was born on November 28, 1912, in Baltimore, Maryland. He was the third of four sons born to Louis Bernstein and Cecelia Bernstein (née Luckman), a middle-class Jewish family. Louis Bernstein, an emigré from Russia, worked in a factory and later owned a grocery store.

Louis attended public schools in Baltimore including Gwynns Falls Junior High School and Baltimore City College. In 1927, at the age of 15, Louis received a four-year scholarship to enroll at the Maryland Institute of Fine and Applied Arts (now the Maryland Institute College of Art, or MICA) in Baltimore. He was awarded a degree in 1932 (Note: Several authors cite different years for Louis's time at the institute or write that he did not ultimately receive a degree, but art historian Diane Upright Headley, writing in 1979, noted that these claims were incorrect and that Louis did in fact receive a degree.) from the fine arts department.

At the institute, Louis received a classical academic training rooted in traditional European art pedagogy that emphasized slow progression through various techniques. He struggled to draw or paint figuratively, attempting to overcome his limitation by repeating his successful compositions often dozens of times to perfect them. Although the curriculum emphasized representational techniques and the Baltimore art community was generally conservative at the time, Louis increasingly gravitated toward modernist aesthetics, often visiting the school's library or the then-private Cone Collection to see the works of Cézanne and early European abstractionists. Louis's only close friend at the time, fellow art student Charles Schucker, described Louis as "very bright" but a loner. Schucker said that Louis's family did not understand why he wanted to be an artist.

His formative years coincided with the aftermath of World War I and the lead-up to the Great Depression, weighing heavily on his ability to find employment as an artist. Despite knowing the challenges he faced in doing so, he decided to remain committed to making art.

== Life and career ==
=== 1930s: Early career in Baltimore, move to New York, WPA ===
Louis stayed in Baltimore for several years after graduating, taking a series of odd jobs to earn income. He worked in an Italian restaurant, at a laundry service, for the Gallup Poll, and doing lawn care in a cemetery. He eventually secured a position in 1934 as a mural painting assistant with the Works Progress Administration's (WPA) newly created Public Works of Art Project (PWAP). Louis helped complete a mural in a school library in Baltimore for the PWAP titled The History of the Written Word, primarily contributing the extensive writings in the painted scenes. He signed the mural as "Maurice Bernstein". He continued to create his own art and in 1935 he was elected president of the Baltimore Artists' Union, a group primarily composed of former PWAP artists seeking labor protections and government support after the closure of the program as well as recognition for living local artists by the Baltimore Museum of Art.

In 1936, Louis moved to New York City, staying at first with fellow Baltimore artist Chet La More in exchange for painting the floor of La More's loft. La More described Louis during this period as "very reserved" and said Louis spent most of his time alone making minimal figural line drawings. After securing a job making models as a window decorator and beginning a relationship, Louis moved into his own apartment. Living in New York exposed him to the burgeoning Abstract Expressionist movement and the city's intellectual milieu; he was acquainted with artists Arshile Gorky and Jack Tworkov during his time there and participated in an experimental painting workshop with David Alfaro Siqueiros. He also often visited the Museum of Modern Art and became interested in the work of painter Max Beckmann. However, Louis maintained a degree of separation from other artists in the city, preferring to spend time privately working, and he made no longtime friendships with artists in New York. Unable to afford many art supplies on his own, Louis often relied on paint manufacturer Leonard Bocour's so-called "Bocour bread line" for paint, wherein Bocour would give away to local artists small wax paper packages of leftover paint that remained after filling tubes for sale.

Louis's art during this period was primarily figurative painting in the social realist style popular with artists like Siqueiros, often using imagery of poverty and the working class. In 1937 he exhibited figurative works along with several other artists from Baltimore at ACA Gallery in New York. The show was featured in the magazine Art Front, the first mention of Louis's work in print. During this period, he began using the name Morris Louis professionally, applying for a second Social Security number under the name in October 1938. Beginning in 1939, he served as a member of the easel division of the WPA's nascent Federal Art Project, a full-time position in painting that required applicant artists prove they were financially destitute in order to qualify. The role allowed him general autonomy in his art-making, and his romantic partner at the time, with whom he lived, was also employed by the program. Louis remained employed there for exactly eighteen months, the longest an artist could stay in the program before having to recertify their eligibility.

=== 1940s: Return to Baltimore ===
Louis stayed in New York for several years after leaving his job with the WPA in 1940 but eventually returned to Baltimore in the early–mid '40s (the precise date of his return is unclear). He moved back in with his parents and his brothers helped support him financially for a time. While living with his family he met Marcella Siegel, their next-door neighbor, and the two began a romantic relationship. Louis continued painting, using his family's basement as a studio, but he became frustrated and depressed at his loss of independence and lack of success.

In 1947, Louis and Siegel married and he relocated to her two-room apartment in Silver Spring, Maryland, a suburb of Washington, D.C. Louis used the bedroom as his painting studio and the couple lived, ate, and slept in the living room. He began exclusively using Magna paint in 1948, an oil-compatible acrylic paint developed by Bocour and Sam Golden. The same year, he exhibited in the annual show of Maryland artists at the Baltimore Museum of Art; he would be included in the show again in 1949, 1950, and 1952. Louis continued to study the work of notable modern artists like Joan Miró and Jackson Pollock and painted in a variety of styles influenced by their work. He also worked extensively in drawing during this period.

=== 1950s: Career in Washington, new methods, national attention ===
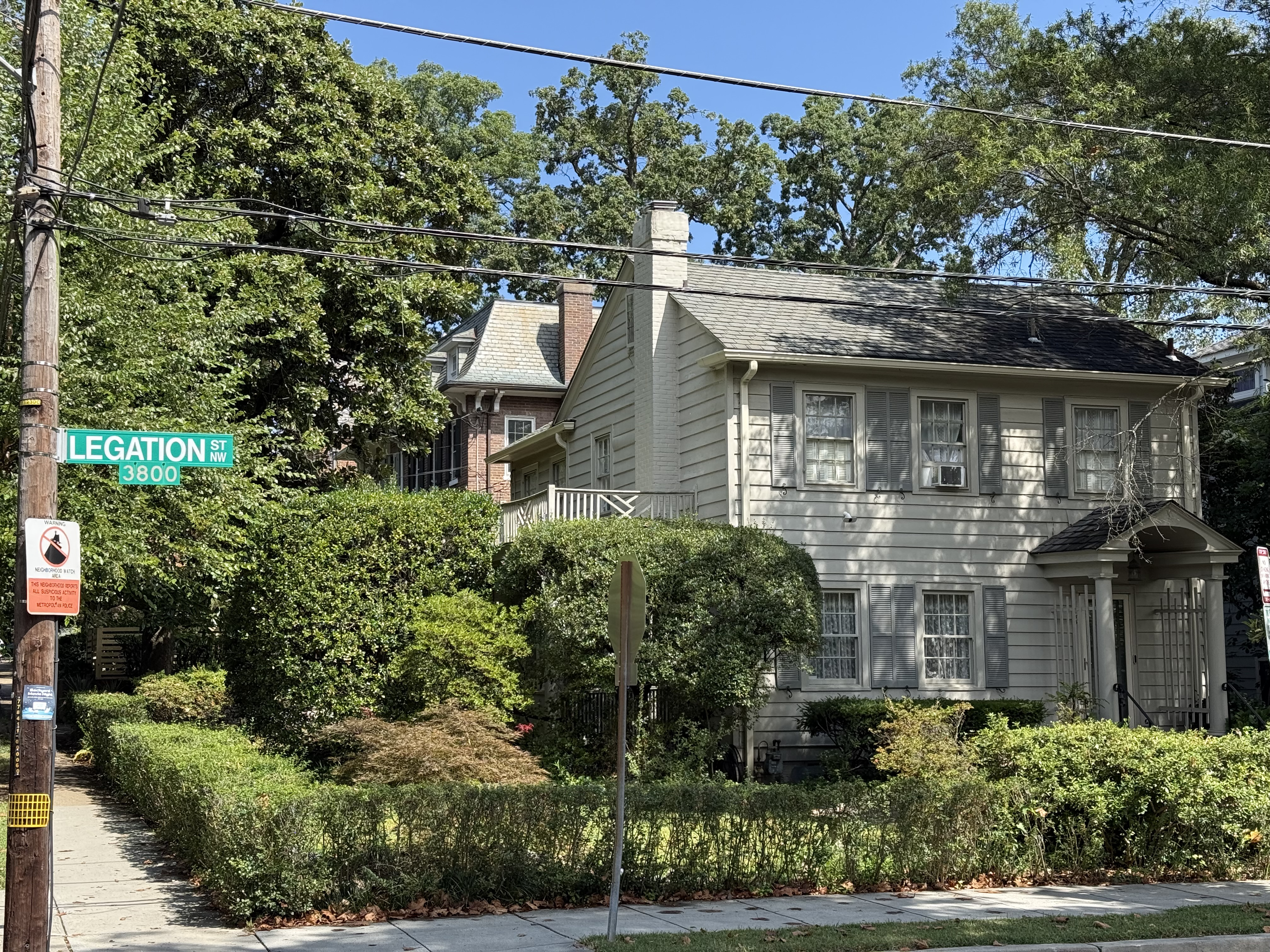
3833 Legation St NW in Washington, Louis's home and studio from 1952 until his death

In 1951, Louis began traveling back to Baltimore to give private painting lessons to a group of students who had requested him. Louis and Siegel moved from Silver Spring to a house on Legation St NW in Washington, D.C.'s Chevy Chase neighborhood in 1952. The same year, at the assistance of artist Jacob Kainen, Louis began teaching night classes for adults twice a week at the Washington Workshop Center for the Arts, an arts center directed by artist Leon Berkowitz. Louis met the younger abstract artist Kenneth Noland, also an instructor at the Workshop Center, soon after he began teaching. Louis later said that, artistically, after meeting Noland, "Suddenly I wasn't alone anymore."

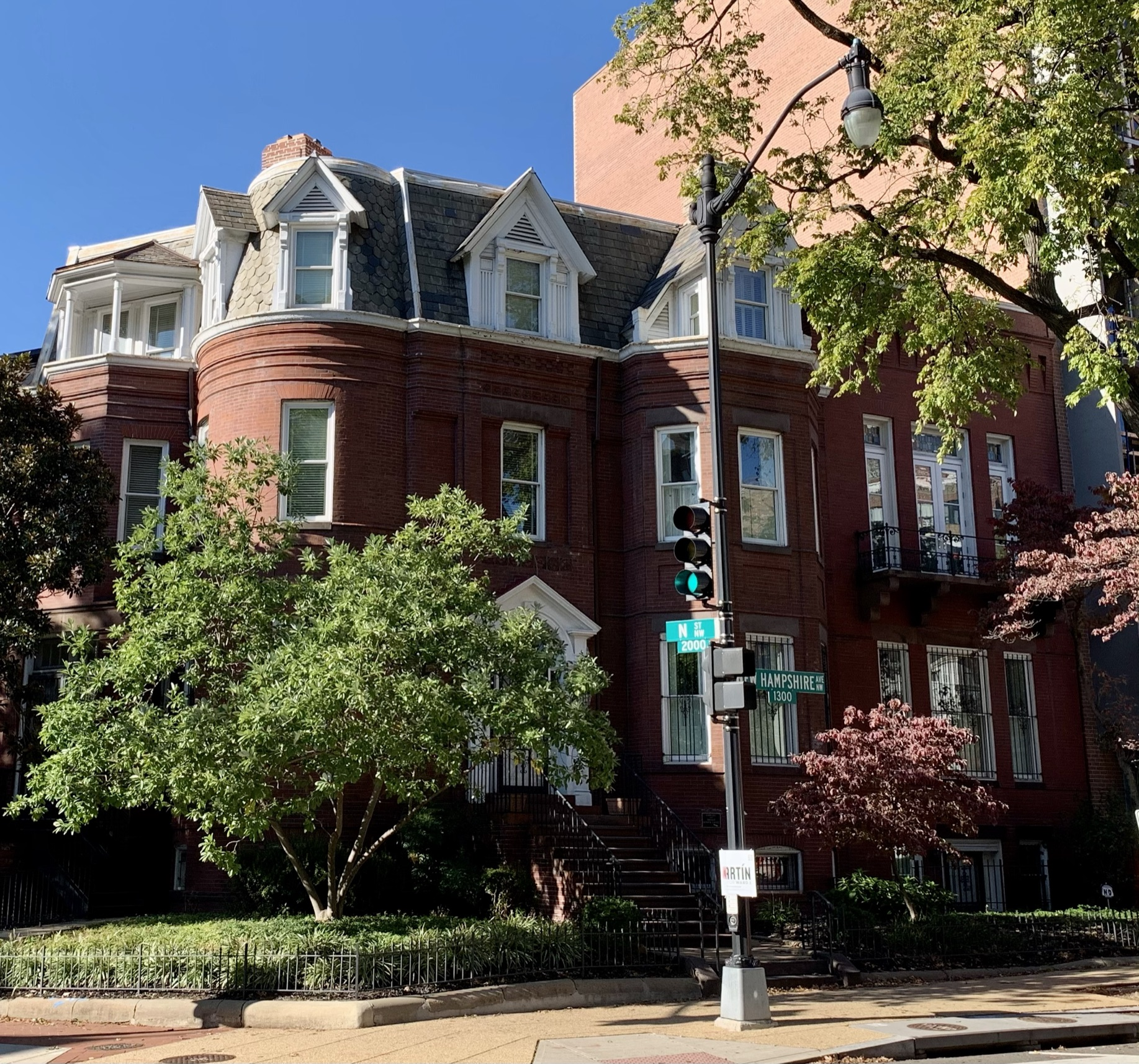
1300 New Hampshire Ave NW in Washington, the home of the Washington Workshop Center for the Arts from 1952 to 1956

The following year, Noland invited Louis on a trip to New York to visit art critic Clement Greenberg and view art in the city, with the hope that Greenberg would introduce the two artists to Pollock, whom they both admired. Noland had first met Greenberg, one of the most influential critics in the country, while studying at Black Mountain College in the summer of 1950. On April 3, 1953, Louis and Noland traveled to New York and met Greenberg who, instead of introducing them to Pollock, organized a studio visit for the group with artist Helen Frankenthaler. She showed the artists her method of painting using thinned acrylic paint that she poured over canvases by hand or applied using a syringe to stain the canvas with color, a method she had in turn adapted from Pollock's stained painting technique. Frankenthaler's monumental stained painting Mountains and Sea, on view in her studio at the time, made a significant impact on Louis and Noland. Speaking later about the importance of seeing Frankenthaler's technique, Louis called her "the bridge between Pollock and what was possible." Writing in 2006 about the studio visit, critic Klaus Kertess said the meeting "quickly became legend in Formalist art lore". The impact of this studio visit and the subsequent historical narratives built around it, including the positioning of Frankenthaler as a stylistic link between Pollock and Louis's generation instead of as an innovator in her own right, has been extensively discussed, analyzed, and debated by critics and art historians.

Also in April 1953, one week after returning from New York, Louis opened his first-ever solo exhibition, hosted at the Workshop Center in Washington. He presented several bodies of work including his Planetary and Tranquilities collage series and his calligraphy-based series The Charred Journals, which was inspired by the book-burnings carried out in Nazi Germany. These works, produced prior to his exposure to Frankenthaler's working methods, were made in styles he had decided to abandon on his return to Washington. Louis also decided to destroy almost all of his paintings created that year prior to his visit to New York.

Upon their return to Washington, Louis and Noland spent several weeks experimenting with various painting and staining application techniques, sometimes working together on one canvas at the same time. The pair referred to their new method of working as "jam painting", in reference to the jazz term; they tried techniques like pouring paint, finger painting, using rags to paint, changing the orientation of a canvas throughout the painting process, cutting paintings, and cutting out paintings from larger canvases. None of their collaborative works survived but Louis continued making stained paintings on his own for the rest of the year, often creating swirling configurations of colors, sometimes with aluminum metallic paint. Noland also introduced Louis to sculptor David Smith around this time.

In January 1954, Greenberg selected Louis for the exhibition Emerging Talent at Kootz Gallery in New York, along with Noland and nine other artists. Greenberg visited Washington on January 5 to select paintings for the show and Louis and Noland traveled to New York several days later to deliver their paintings, spending time with Greenberger, Frankenthaler, Smith, and painter Harry Jackson while in the city. Reviewing the show for Art Digest, critic James Fitzsimmons called Louis's work one of "two of the best paintings" in the exhibition. Stuart Preston in The New York Times wrote that "praise is due [...] to the canvas by Morris Louis which erupts volcanic clouds of silver paint." One of Louis's paintings from the exhibition, Silver Discs, was soon purchased by Gloria Vanderbilt and Leopold Stokowski.

==== Drawings and Early Work ====
Louis's early artistic output—comprising his drawings and early paintings—reflects a distinct stylistic evolution rooted in a variety of influences and artistic experiments. Louis's early drawings, primarily executed in pencil, charcoal, pen and ink, and occasionally watercolor, reflect a young artist grappling with the fundamentals of form, composition, and expression. These works are less documented than his later paintings, as many were destroyed or remain in private collections, but surviving examples provide insight into his technical skill and evolving aesthetic.

==== Veil series (1954, 1958–1959) ====
In 1954, Louis produced his mature Veil Paintings, which were characterized by overlapping, superimposed layers of transparent color poured onto and stained into sized or unsized canvas. The Veil Paintings consist of waves of brilliant, curving color-shapes submerged in translucent washes through which separate colors emerge principally at the edges. Although subdued, the resulting color is immensely rich. In another series, the artist used long parallel bands and stripes of pure color arranged side by side in rainbow effects.

The Veil paintings were among Louis's earliest mature works and were initially inspired by a 1953 visit to Helen Frankenthaler's studio with critic Clement Greenberg and fellow painter Kenneth Noland. There, he observed Frankenthaler's stain painting technique, which became foundational to his own process.

In the Veil series, Louis poured heavily diluted Magna acrylic paints onto unprimed canvas, allowing pigment to seep and flow into the fabric, creating overlapping translucent washes. These works were often characterized by vertical bands of subdued color layered in a diaphanous and atmospheric manner. The effect resembled cascading veils of mist or liquid color, hence the name. The earliest Veils were produced in 1954 but the most developed phase occurred between 1958 and 1959. Key works from this period, such as Alpha-Pi (1958), demonstrate a control of gravitational flow and chromatic subtlety that became hallmarks of Louis's technique.

The thinned acrylic paint was allowed to stain the canvas, making the pigment at one with the canvas as opposed to "on top". This conformed to Greenberg's conception of "Modernism" as it made the entire picture plane flat. The painting Tet is a good example of his Veil Paintings.

==== Florals and Columns series (1959–1960) ====
Following the Veils, Louis explored a more centralized and structured compositional mode in the so-called Florals and Columns. Though these series are less formally designated by the artist, art historians have grouped them based on shared characteristics.

The Florals feature radiating or blooming forms that suggest organic motifs, albeit within a strictly non-representational idiom. These paintings exhibit denser and more opaque paint application compared to the ethereal Veils. In contrast, the Columns series presents vertical arrangements of color, resembling pillars or streaks, often running parallel and terminating sharply at the top or bottom edge of the canvas.

These two interrelated series reflect Louis's transitional efforts between the Veils and more assertive formats that would culminate in the Unfurleds. They also indicate a growing interest in compositional balance and the dynamic between positive and negative space.

=== 1960s ===
==== Aleph series (1960–1961) ====
Named after the first letter of the Hebrew alphabet, the Aleph series marked a brief but distinctive phase in Louis's practice. These works, produced primarily in 1960, featured centralized arrangements of paint that floated or hovered within the pictorial field, often appearing more contained and symmetrical than earlier series.

The Alephs often employed bold, sometimes opaque colors, and created spatial tension between figure and ground. While the use of staining persisted, the compositions were tighter and more architectonic. The title Aleph possibly suggests a foundational or originary theme, aligning with Louis's interest in elemental structures and symbols.

==== Unfurled series (1960–1961) ====
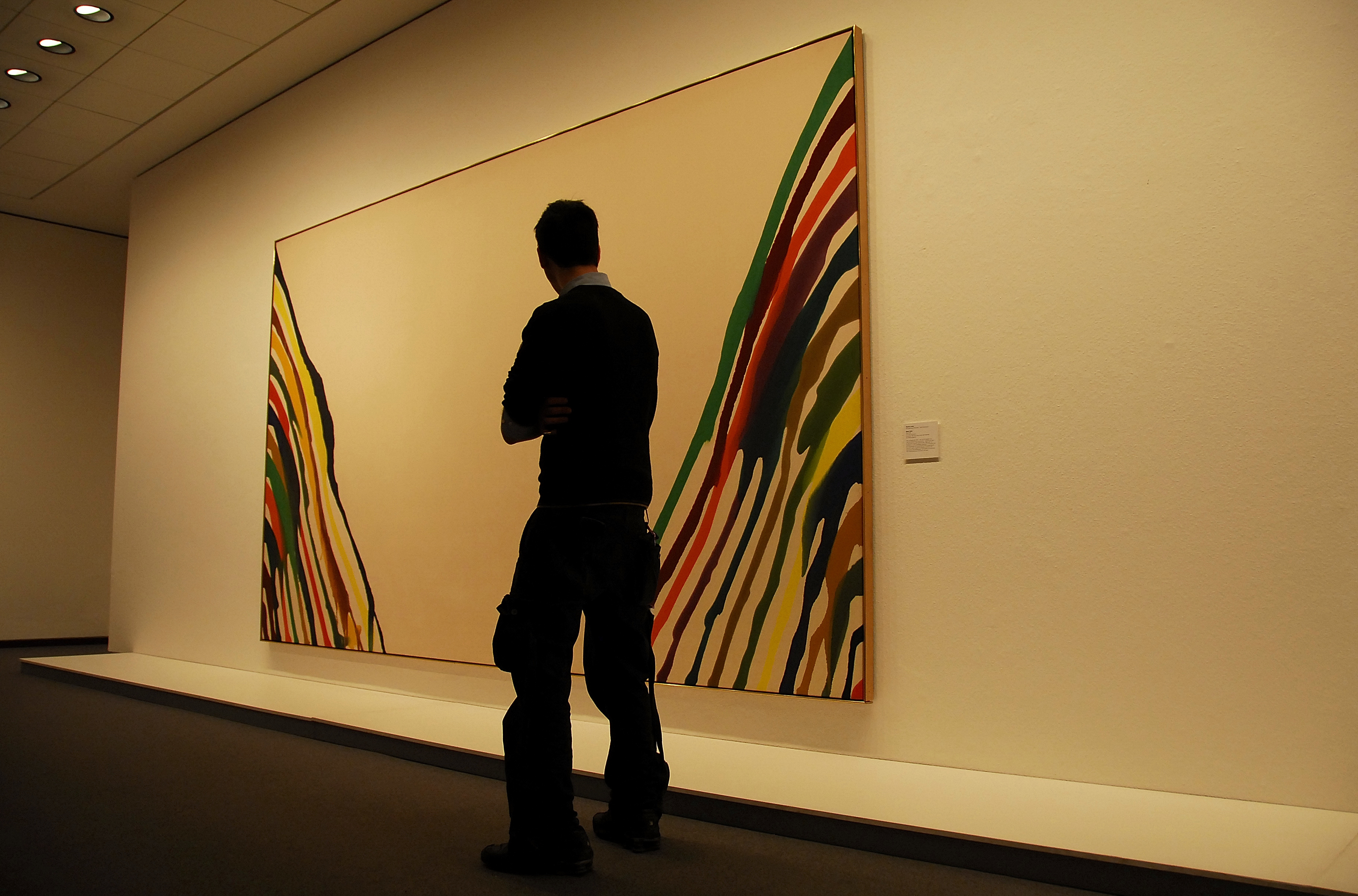
A museum visitor viewing Beta Zeta at the Neue Nationalgalerie, Berlin

Arguably Louis's most iconic series, the Unfurleds represent a dramatic departure from the more meditative Veils. Created between 1960 and 1961, these works are notable for their large scale and bold, flaring bands of color that stream from both sides of the canvas, leaving a vast unpainted area in the center.

The Unfurleds are divided into two main groups: the Alpha and Delta series. The Alpha-Unfurleds feature arcs of color spilling in from the top edges, while the Delta-Unfurleds typically display diagonal trajectories from the corners. The contrast between the stained areas and untouched canvas emphasized the painting as both object and field, reinforcing the flatness of the picture plane while energizing its surface with dramatic movement.

These works were executed with unprecedented speed and scale, sometimes using specially built ramps and multiple assistants to manage the large canvases. They exemplify Louis's mastery of staining, gravity, and chromatic orchestration.

==== Stripe paintings (1961–1962) ====
1–33 (1962) at the National Gallery of Art in 2022

In the final stage of his career, Louis turned to a series of vertical Stripe paintings, produced from 1961 until his death in 1962. These works consist of regularly spaced, upright bands of pure color that span the height of the canvas. Each stripe was poured individually, using gravity and capillary action to guide the flow, resulting in remarkably crisp edges and consistent widths.

Unlike the gestural or atmospheric qualities of earlier series, the Stripes are highly ordered and rhythmically structured. Paintings such as Number 99 (1962) emphasize repetition, sequence, and the intrinsic properties of color. The color palette was often more saturated and synthetic in appearance, with an emphasis on juxtaposition and optical interaction.

The Stripe paintings represent a culmination of Louis's career-long concerns with scale, color clarity, and material presence. They also anticipate developments in Minimalism and systemic abstraction that would follow in the later 1960s.

== Personal life and death ==
Louis married Marcella Siegel in 1947. She supported him throughout his career and in memory of him she supported one artist every year through the Morris Louis Fellowship at George Washington University.

He was diagnosed with lung cancer in 1962 and soon after died at his home in Washington, D.C., on September 7, 1962. The cause of his illness was attributed to prolonged exposure to paint vapors. The Estate of Morris Louis is represented exclusively by Diane Upright, a former professor of fine art at Harvard University.

== Exhibitions ==
Major Louis exhibitions were also organized by the Museum of Fine Arts, Boston, in 1967 and the National Gallery of Art, Washington, D.C., in 1976. In 1986 there was an important retrospective exhibition of his works at the Museum of Modern Art (MoMA) in New York. During 2007–2008 an important retrospective was held by museums in San Diego, at the Museum of Contemporary Art, in Atlanta at the High Museum, and in Washington, DC. at the Hirshhorn Museum and Sculpture Garden.

== Notable works in public collections ==
- Beth Shin, 1958. Pérez Art Museum Miami, Florida
- Delta Eta, 1960. Pérez Art Museum Miami, Florida
- Untitled, 1959–60, the Doris and Donald Fisher Collection at the San Francisco Museum of Modern Art in the Approaching American Abstraction Exhibition

== Legacy ==
=== Posthumous exhibitions ===
In October 1962, one month after Louis's death, André Emmerich Gallery mounted a posthumous solo exhibition of the final works the artist had completed, a set of his Stripe paintings. The exhibition, Louis's fourth solo show in New York, was positively reviewed by critics in the city. New York's Guggenheim Museum opened a memorial exhibition in September 1963 of seventeen paintings by Louis from 1954 to 1960.

Louis was selected as one of eight artists to represent the United States in the 32nd Venice Biennale in 1964. The Seattle Art Museum hosted an exhibition of paintings from Louis's Veils and Unfurleds series in 1967 which included several previously unseen works.

== Art market ==
In 2015, a striped canvas by Louis, Number 36 (1962), from the collection of Lord Anthony and Lady Evelyn Jacobs sold for £1.5 million at Christie's in London.

== See also ==
- Color field painting
- Washington Color School
- Magna paint – Brand name of an acrylic resin paint
- Pirouette: Turning Points in Design – 2025 exhibition at the Museum of Modern Art
- Post-painterly abstraction – Term coined by art critic Clement Greenberg
- Stripes – Long and narrow band of color, often in alternating sets

== Notes, citations and references ==
=== Cited references ===
- Elderfield, John (1974). "I: Introduction". Morris Louis. London: Arts Council of Great Britain. pp. 7–11. ISBN 9780728700291. OCLC 1339978.
- Elderfield, John (1986). Morris Louis (PDF). New York: Museum of Modern Art. ISBN 0870704184. OCLC 14816180.
- Kertess, Klaus (2006). "Beauty's Stain". Morris Louis Now: An American Master Revisited. Atlanta: High Museum of Art. pp. 9–20. ISBN 9781932543100. OCLC 77641363.
- Robbins, Daniel (October 1963). "Morris Louis: Triumph of Color". Art News. Vol. 62. pp. 28–29, 57–58.
- Rudenstine, Angelica (1967). "Chronology". Morris Louis, 1912–1962. Museum of Fine Arts, Boston. pp. 25–28. OCLC 720047.
- Upright Headley, Diane (1979). "The Drawings of Morris Louis". The Drawings of Morris Louis. Washington, D.C.: National Collection of Fine Arts, Smithsonian Institution. pp. 11–67. OCLC 5680127 – via Internet Archive.
- Upright, Diane (1985). Morris Louis: The Complete Paintings. New York: Harry N. Abrams. ISBN 0810912805. OCLC 11622690.
