= Blaine Gledhill Larson =

American painter (1937–2022)

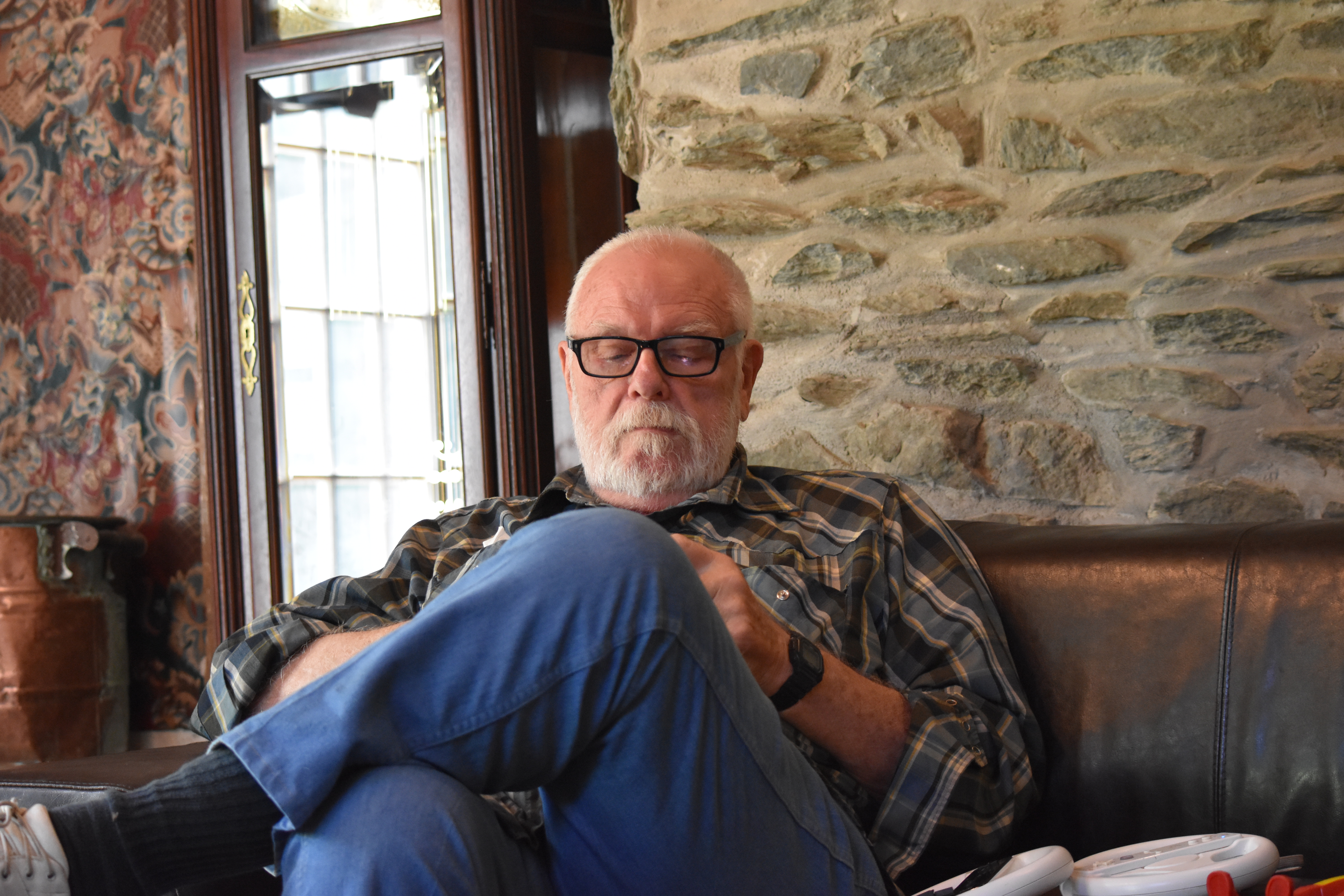
- Blaine Larson at "Little Alps" in 2016
- Born: July 13, 1937; Salt Lake City, Utah, U.S.
- Died: November 24, 2022 (aged 85); Phenix, VA., U.S.
- Other names: Franklin Gledhill Larson, Blaine Larson-Crowther
- Education: American University
- Occupation(s): Painter, educator
- Spouse: Anne Donovan

Blaine Gledhill Larson (July 13, 1937 – November 24, 2022) was a prominent American post-war abstract expressionist artist and educator allied with the Washington Color Painters active in the vibrant Washington DC area art scene centred around the Corcoran School of the Arts and Design and the Washington Gallery of Modern Art in the second half of the 20th century and early 21st century. Although often included in the second generation of Colour Painters, like Leon Berkowitz, he rejected the label for his work, insisting he was sui generis.

== Early life and education ==
Blaine Gledhill Larson was born July 13, 1937, in Salt Lake City, UT to Blaine Cowley Larson and Margaret Gledhill. His father was very active in public service and local politics and his mother was a concert pianist.

Between 1953 and 1958 he studied at Brigham Young University, Mills College, University of California at Berkley, the Ansel Adams Yosemite Worksop, and the San Francisco Art Institute. Under the tutelage of Robert Franklin Gates, He completed a Bachelor of Art from American University in Washington, DC in 1963, where he also received a Master's in Art in 1966.

He married Rayna Gay Pace on August 2, 1957 (div.) and had two children. From 1961 to 1963 he and Rayna served in the Peace Corps in Manilla, Philippines. They began working on a TV show called English as a Key on TV5 (Philippine TV network) of the Associated Broadcasting Corporation produced by Robert F. Chandler Jr. Their activities during their time in the Philippines are detailed in the book Answering Kennedy's Call: Pioneering the Peace Corps in the Philippines by Parker W. Borg (Author), Maureen J. Carroll (Author), Patricia MacDermot Kasdan (Author), Stephen W. Wells (Author).

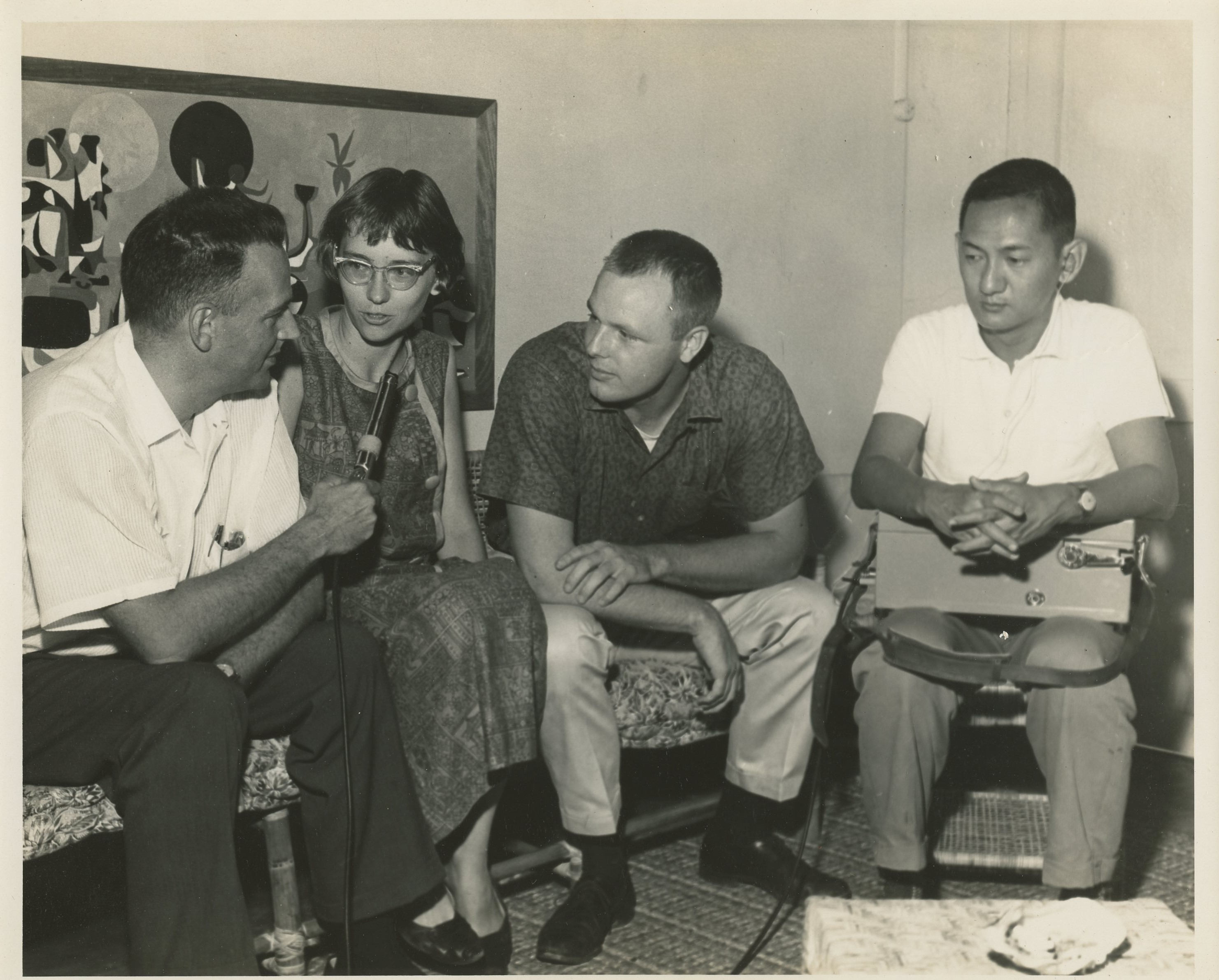
Blaine (centre right) and Rayna (centre left) in the Philippines engaging in Peace Corps activities

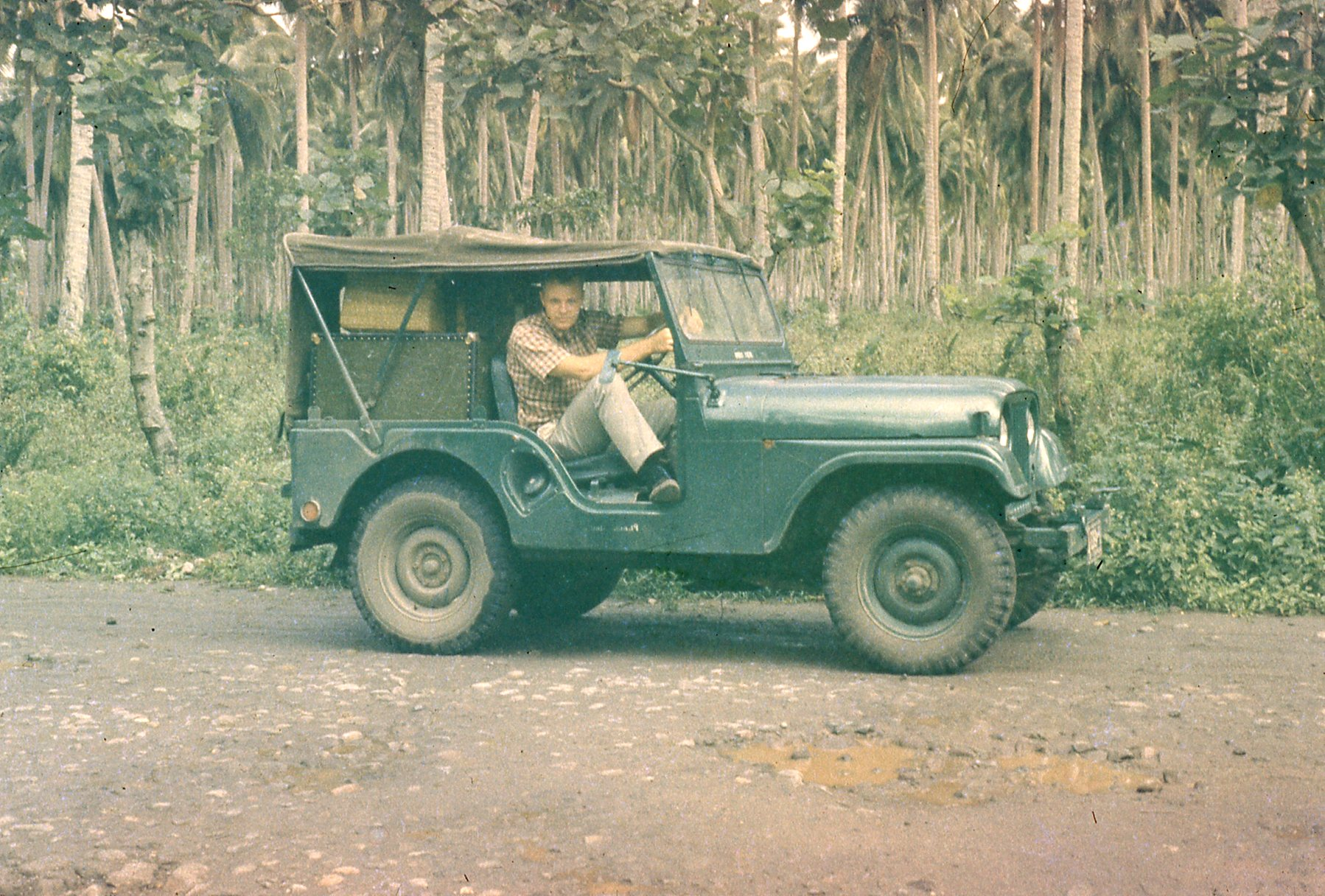
Blaine Larson driving a Jeep in the Philippines as a Peace Corps volunteer

He later married Anne Virginia Donovan (daughter of State Senator John A. K. Donovan) on December 23, 1967. Anne was studying painting under Pietro Lazzari at the Corcoran School of Art. Anne is known for her octopus paintings on oval canvases and wooden boards. John and Mary gave, as a wedding gift, their country log home on the Catoctin Creek in Taylorstown, Virginia, which they dubbed "Little Alps". They had three children.

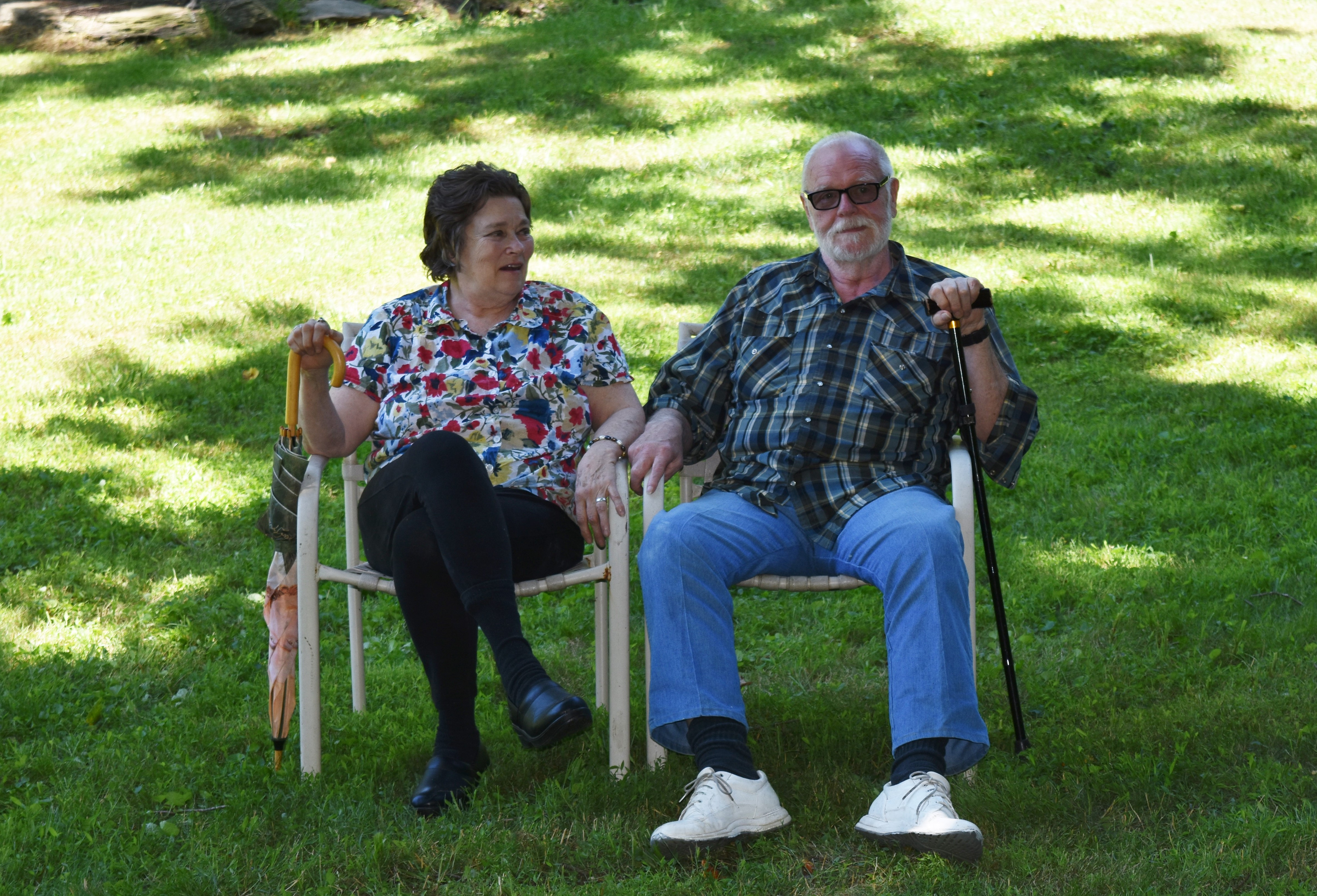
Anne (left) and Blaine (right) seated outdoors at "Little Alps"

Life at "Little Alps", though primitive (wood heat and no running water), was not dull; the ramshackle construction, the international collection of artwork, objects d’art, kitsch, the permissive atmosphere, the stone cliffs populated with goats, Catoctin Creek, and the alluvial plain were conducive to creativity, drawing many painters, sculptors, craftsmen, and photographers from the area such as Ed Zerne (painting and sculpture), Jerry Lake (photography), Jennie Lea Knight (sculpture, drawing), Andrew Hudson (painting and drawing), Teruo Hara (pottery, sculpture, design), Frank DiPerna (photography), Mark Power (photography), Carmen Barros Howell (painting), Jacob Kainen (painting, printmaking), John P. Wise (painting, sculpture, collage), Tommy Noonan (painting, collage), William Christenberry (photography, painting, sculpture), H.I. Gates (sculpture), Maggie Siner (painting), and serving as an incubator for the artists, musicians, and artisans of the next generation, including The Furnace Mountain Band, David Tiller (music), Martin Fair (crafts, design), Tara Linhardt (music), Courtney Fair (crafts, design), Melissa Foster (painting), David Staton (painting), and Mora Larson da Silva (stained glass, drawing, photography). Anne eventually opened a framing shop in Taylorstown and began framing her husband's, her own, and others' works.

In 2007, the Larsons bought a house at auction in Phenix, VA, near their daughter. Initially, they split their time between Taylorstown and Phenix, but gradually moved everything and stayed in Phenix. Larson was a voracious reader and maintained a library of several thousand books.

== Career ==
=== Educator ===
From 1961-1965, Larson taught art history, design, drawing, sculpture, English, writing, baroque and ancient art, watercolour, and other classes at Fairfax County Public Schools, Arlington Public Schools, Mary Washington College of the University of Virginia, Montgomery College, University of the Philippines, George Washington University, University of Pittsburgh, Prince George’s Community College, and Hood College.

He established and operated an art school in Dupont Circle for two years, offering instruction in serigraphy, drawing, woodcut, painting, sculpture, and colour theory.

Larson held a professorship at the Corcoran School of the Arts and Design from 1965-2000.

Through his years of teaching and mentoring, Larson has undoubtedly influenced many artists of subsequent generations. Some who acknowledge his influence are Andrew Hudson, David Staton, Brad Anderson, and Chris Eichholtz.

=== Critic ===
After meeting in the mid-1960s, Larson and Andrew Hudson began regularly critiquing each other's work, beginning in 1970. Over the next 5 decades, they came to rely on each other’s eyes to continuously improve and push their work in new directions.

=== Artist ===
Larson’s artistic output mostly consisted of drawing, sculpture, photography, and, primarily, painting. Larson’s style, technique, form, media, and use of materials evolved continually throughout his career. He was influenced early by Leger when at Mills College, “When Blaine Larson came to study art at Mills College in Oakland, California in the mid-fifties, French artist Fernand Leger's brief stay as an instructor there was long over. During the World War II years, many of the most advanced European artists – Mondrian, André Masson, Chagall, Roberto Matta, Max Ernst, Yves Tanguy, and Leger, worked, taught and exhibited in America, away from direct conflict. American artists were ripe for new creative excitement, and it all finally resulted in the first made-in-America art movements of modern times. Beginning with the freedom of abstract expressionism, American art tumbled into a rapid succession of Pop Art, Op Art, Minimalism, Colour Field and other movements. No one found it surprising that Leger's after-presence lingered for some time in a far Western school. It was in this atmosphere that Blaine Larson gained knowledge and absorbed experience of the art of painting and sculpture.” Other influences on Larson were Hans Hofmann, Werner Tübke, and Jules Olitski, whose dictum “Keep the surface alive” guided his in-process evaluations of his own works.

=== Shaped Works: 1964-1970 ===
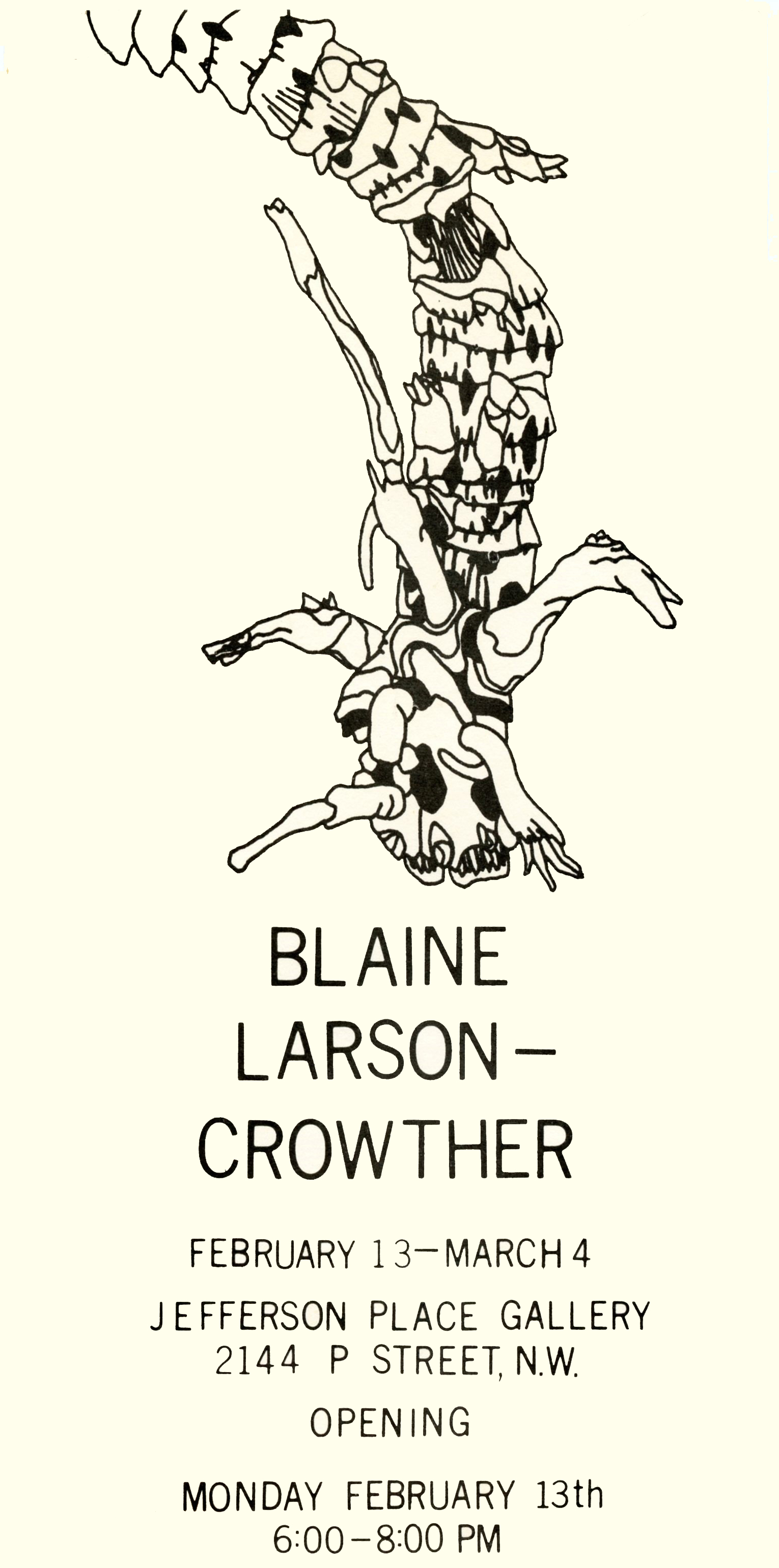
Jefferson Place Gallery flyer

After returning from the Peace Corps, Larson taught in Arlington County Public Schools (VA), and Mary Washington College in Fredericksburg, VA. Beginning in 1969 he taught at the Corcoran College of Art and Design, and was chair of their open painting program.

Larson (who, for a time, shared studio space with Jennie Lea Knight) began exhibiting at the Jefferson Place Gallery in 1965 under the name Blaine Larson–Crowther. He would have four additional solo shows at Jefferson Place between 1967 and 1970. In 1968 curators James Harithas, Director of the Corcoran, and Walter Hopps, Director Washington Gallery Modern Art, included Larson's paintings in the exhibition "Ten Years," celebrating the 10th Anniversary of the Jefferson Place. The exhibition also included the works of William Calfee, Gene Davis, Willem de Looper, Thomas Downing, Robert Franklin Gates, Colin Greenly, Sam Gilliam, Helene Herzbrun, Valerie Hollister, Sheila Isham, Jacob Kainen, Rockne Krebs, Howard Mehring, Mary Pinchot Meyer, Kenneth Noland, V.V. Rankine, and Paul Reed.

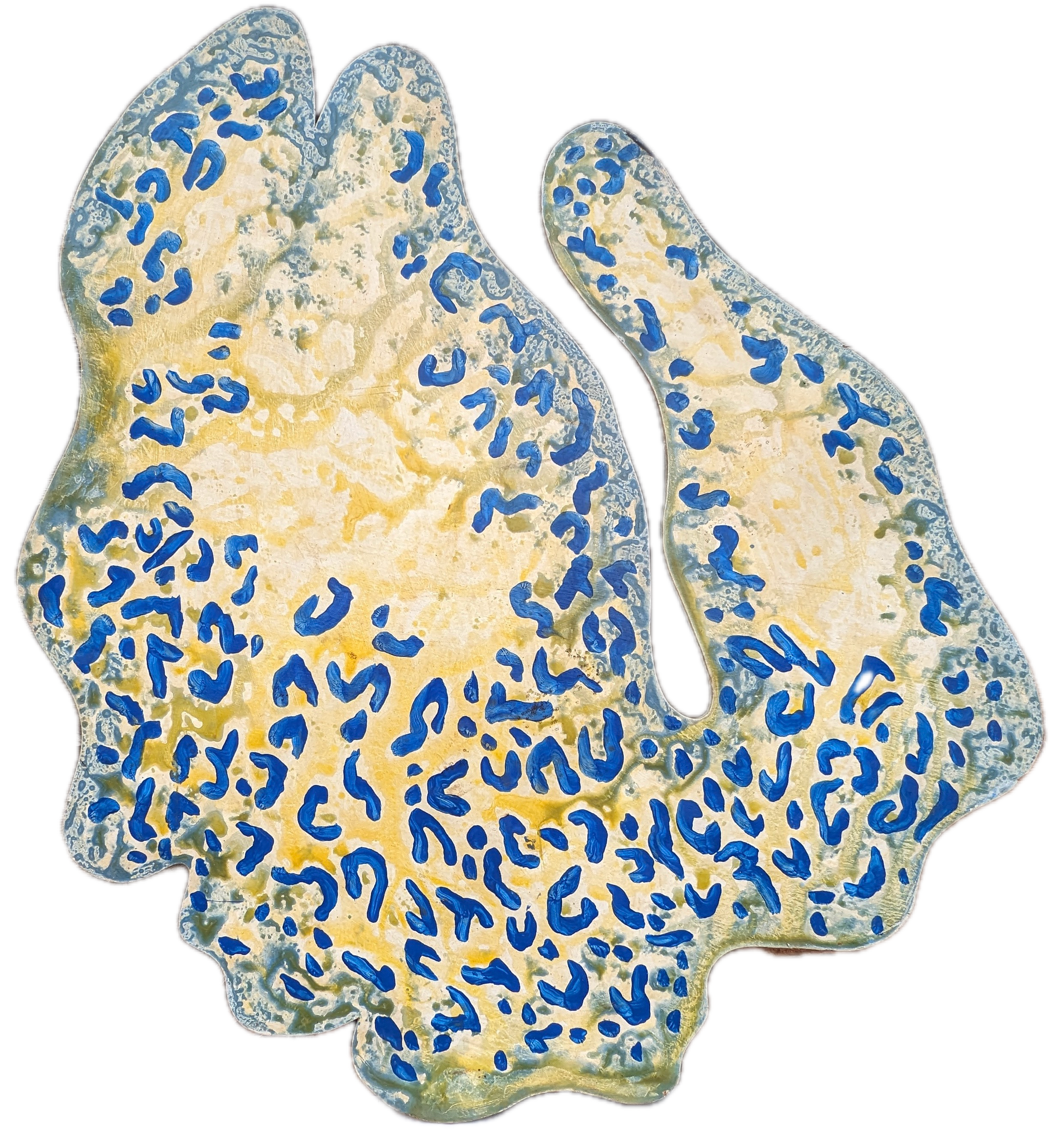
Get Set (late 1960s) acrylic on shaped plywood 119 x 135 cm

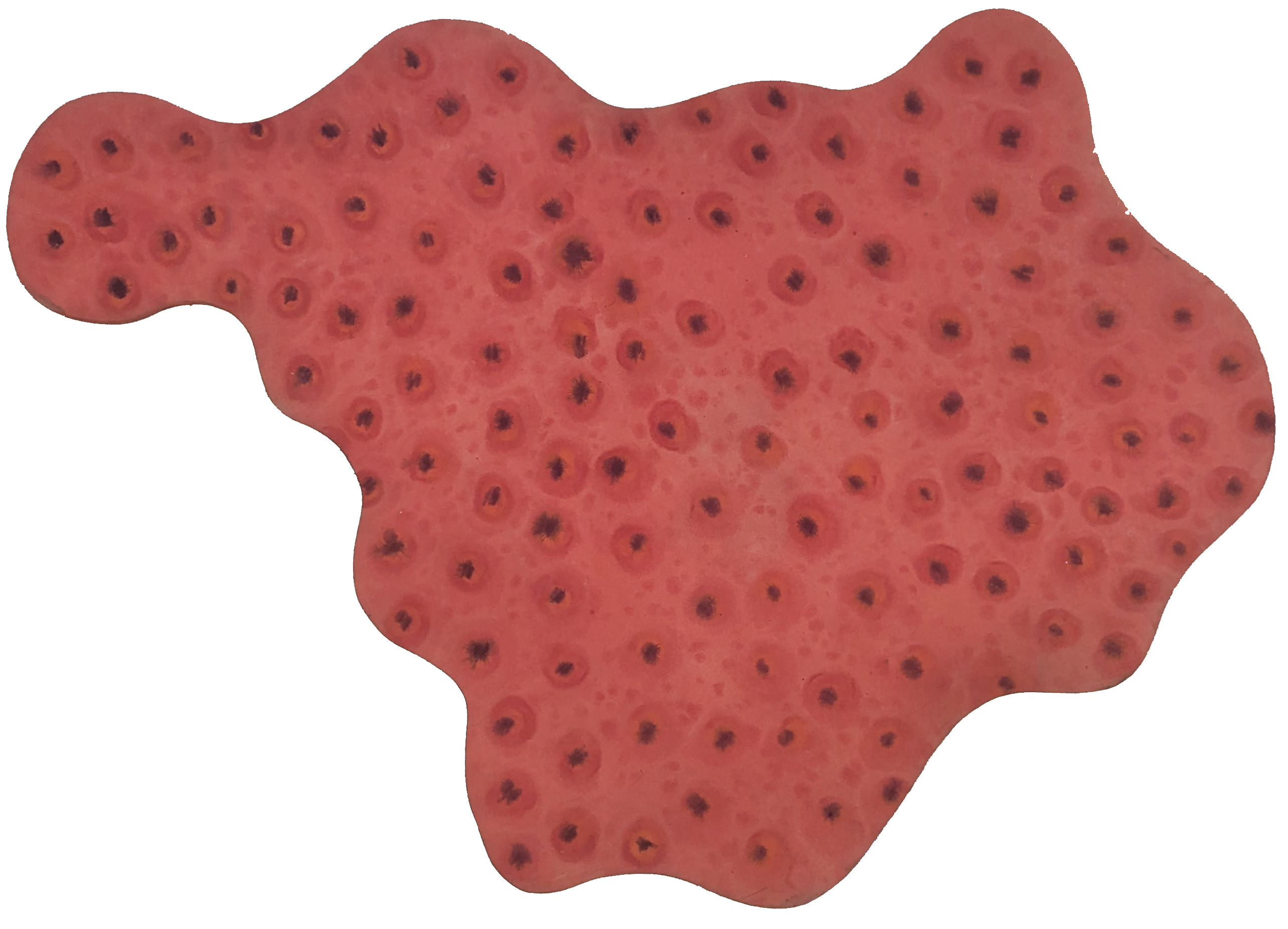
Red Boiling Springs (late 1960s) stained canvas on shaped plywood 117 x 168 cm

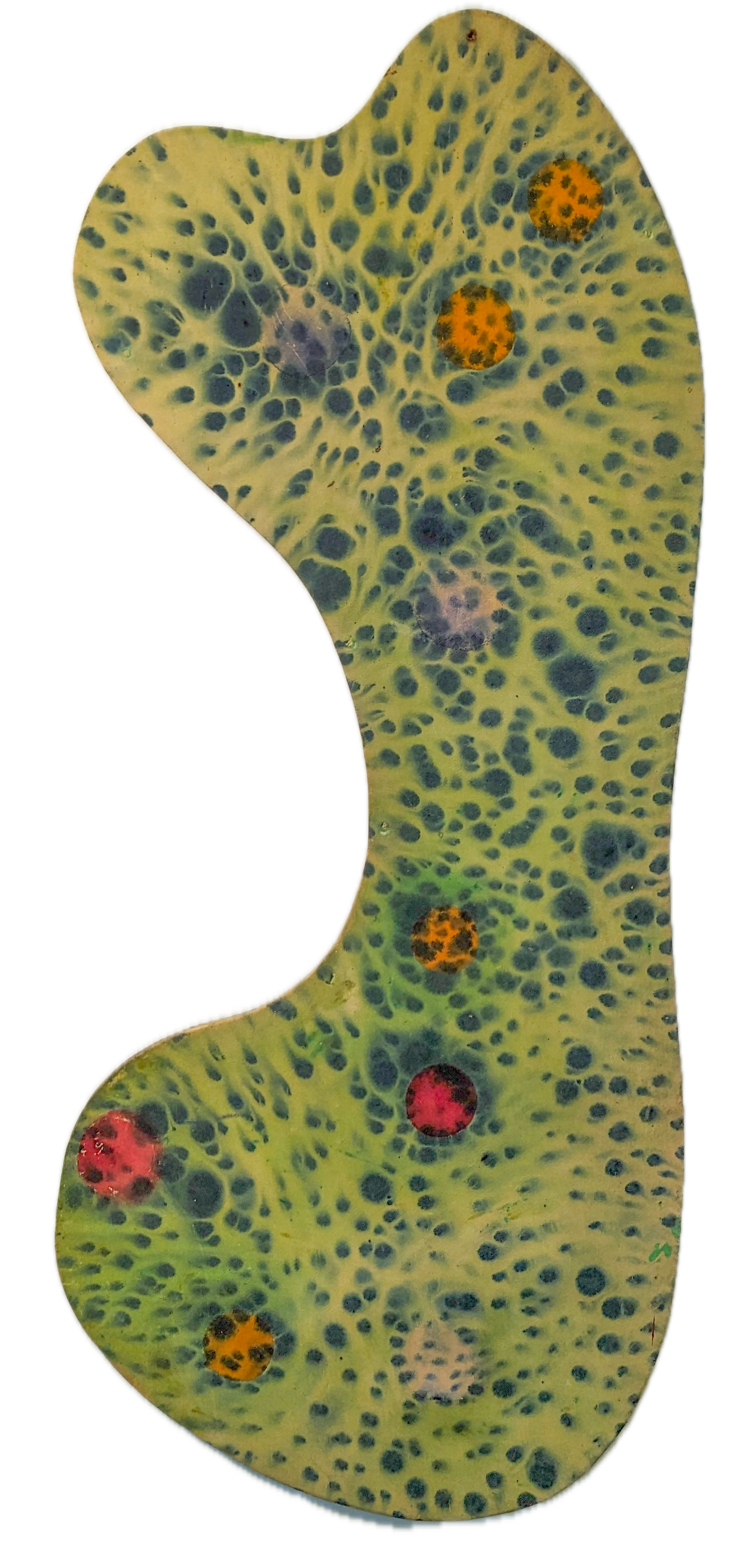
Helvella (late 1960s) stained canvas on shaped plywood 498 x 262 cm

After the Jefferson Place closed in 1974, Larson exhibited with Gallery 10, and later Diane Brown Gallery in the 1970s, and Jack Rasmussen Gallery in the 1980s.

In 1970, his work was included in "Ten Washington Artists: 1950–1970" at the Edmonton Art Gallery in Edmonton, Alberta, which also included the works of Davis, Downing, Gilliam, Knight, Krebs, Mehring, and Noland, along with Clark V. Fox and Morris Louis. That same year, his work was also included in the exhibition "Washington: Twenty Years" at the Baltimore Museum of Art. which also included Downing, Gilliam, Greenly, Herzbrun, Isham, Krebs, Louis, Mehring, Meyer, and Noland, as well as works by Leon Berkowitz, James Gabriel, Mary Orwen, Carroll Sockwell, and Robert Stackhouse.

In his master's thesis, "Development of a Graphic Vocabulary," for American University, Larson wrote that he aimed to study "natural forms... not previously used to any great extent in painting and drawing," and selected skeletal systems, insects, protozoa, and plants (excluding flowers). Washington Post art critic, Andrew Hudson, described the work in Artforum as "daring" and "going against "safe taste,"" and reminiscent of Ferdinand Léger, Nicholas Krushenick, and Paul Klee rather than Kenneth Noland or Morris Louis.

In a review of the 10th Anniversary of the Jefferson Place, Washington Star critic Benjamin Forgey wrote that Larson "wins the humor department with a canvas shaped like a funny-bone," Of a 1970 exhibition, where Larson worked with plywood cutouts, Washington Post critic Paul Richard wrote, "The gallery visitor, long accustomed to precision and austerity is likely to find these squirmy things menacing and disconcerting," further stating how the art evokes the works of Frank Stella, Robert Irwin, the Surrealists, and Henri Matisse's paper cut-outs.

=== Painting on Paper: 1970s ===
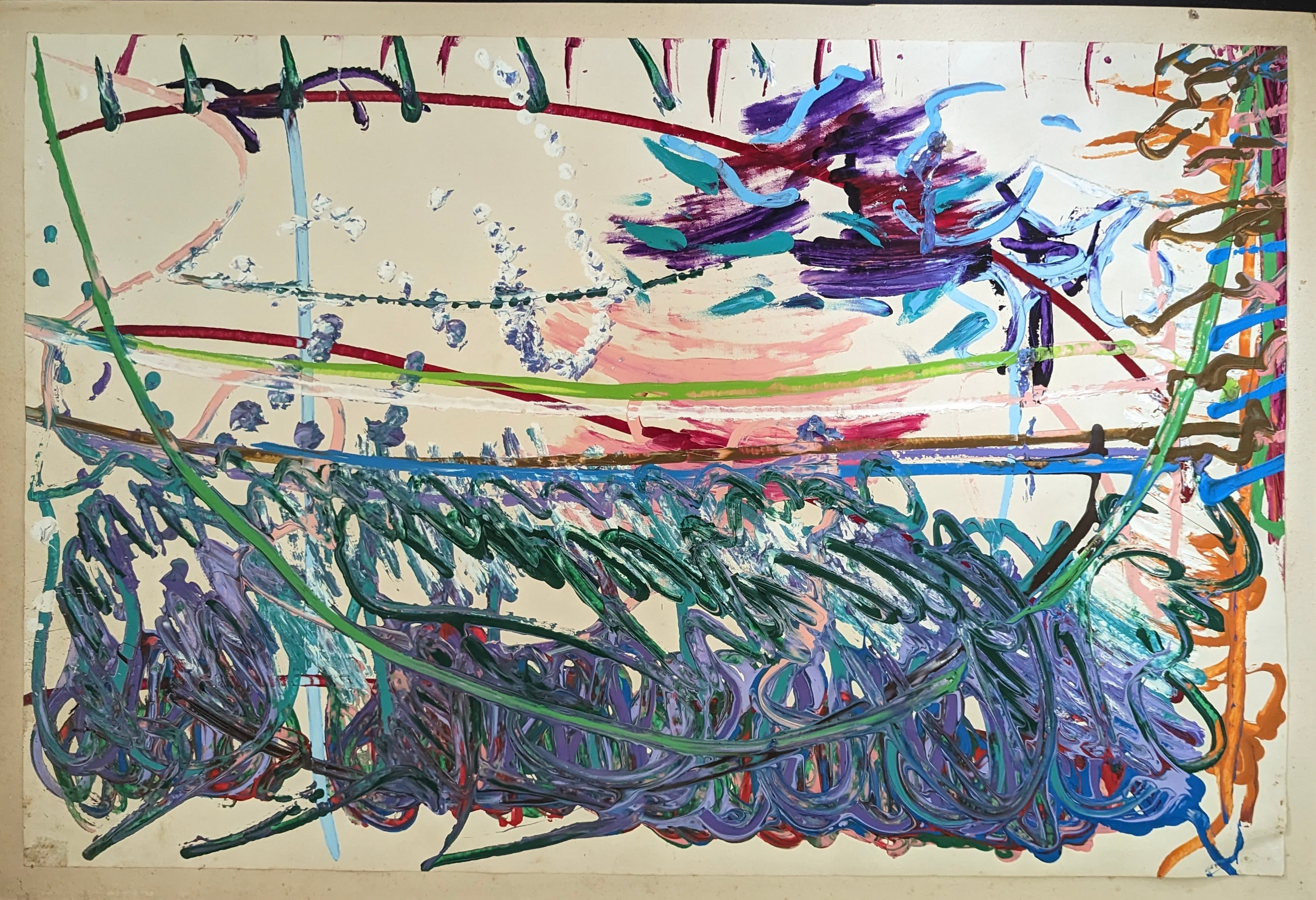
Fawanijie 1970s acrylic on paper 58x89 cm

In the 1970s, his paintings re-examined “the half-antique conventions of postwar action painting. He tweaks and teases them, but does not pay them homage. Though he scribbles with his paint, splishing and dripping it, his paintings have within them no mood of sombre anguish. Instead, they display lyricism confounded by the whacky. His colours are electric, glaring, unexpected.” Generally, these paintings were on paper with a landscape orientation and mounted in pink frames. Larson, discussing his use of paper, says, “My work on paper had something to do with getting “Pop”-ishness out of myself, and with wanting to do something shocking. I became dissatisfied with my sculptural direction in 1970. I had seen Andrew working on paper for some time and decided to try it. By accident, the paper I ordered was a bilious green. I decided to keep it and try working with it. This green paper actually helped me to get back into pure painting: it was awful, it wrinkled, and it ultimately created a tension that caused me to develop in new directions.

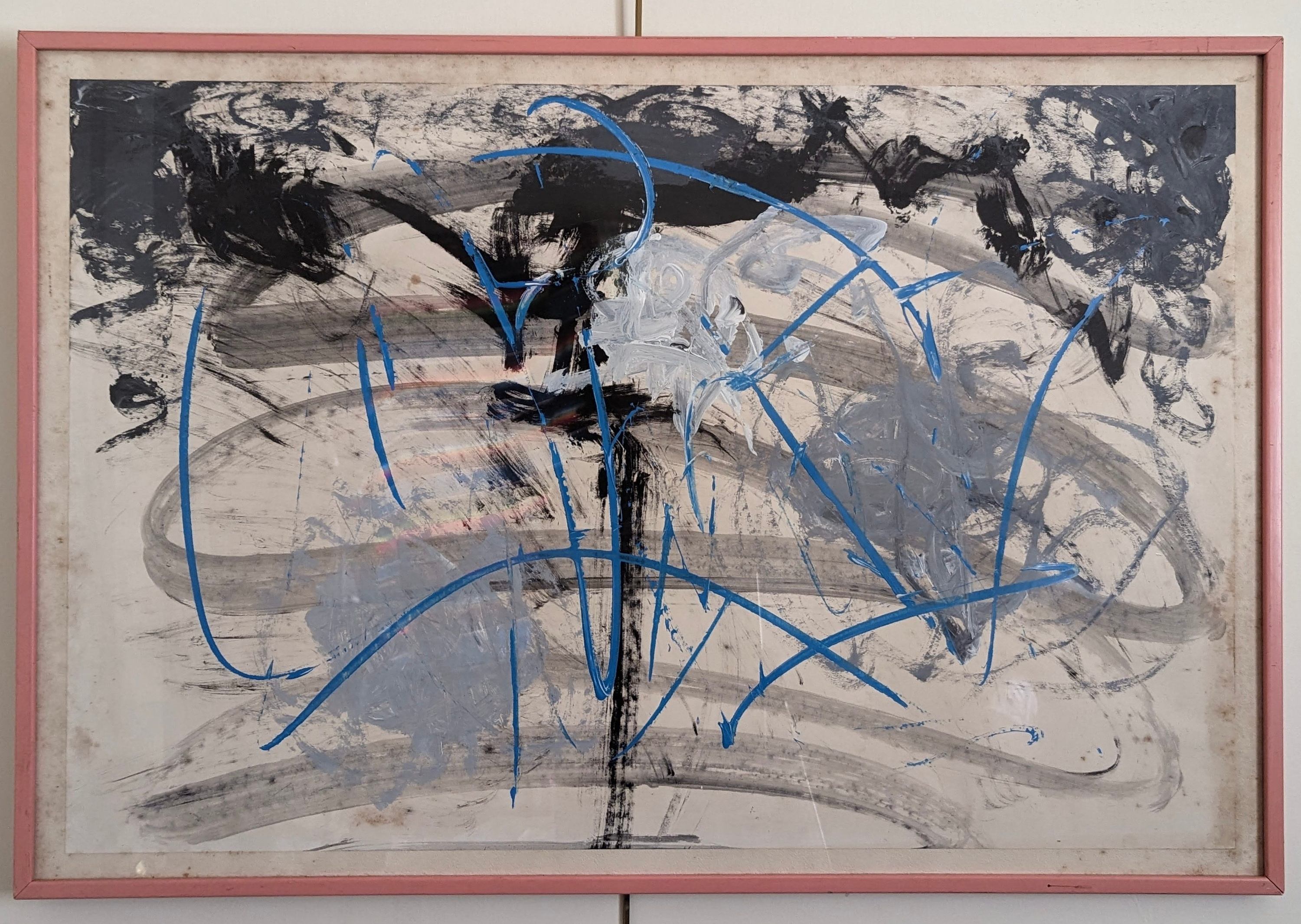
Flaerisiko (1970s) acrylic on paper 58 x 89 cm

I exorcised whatever was anti-art, anti-painting within me by painting in an uncomfortable situation. It was a fight that turned out to be very helpful. By using this green paper, I painted myself out of an aesthetic depression. Then I switched to white paper: I found a paper that was substantial, that didn’t wrinkle, that was fine, clean, something to relate to. I came to realise the differences between painting on paper and painting on canvas. I couldn’t have understood those differences without the initial work on paper. Now the advantages that I see with the canvas are numerous: I can stain into the raw canvas; I can draw on top of it; there’s more flexibility with the material, more plastic possibilities.”

=== Diamond Paintings: 1980s ===
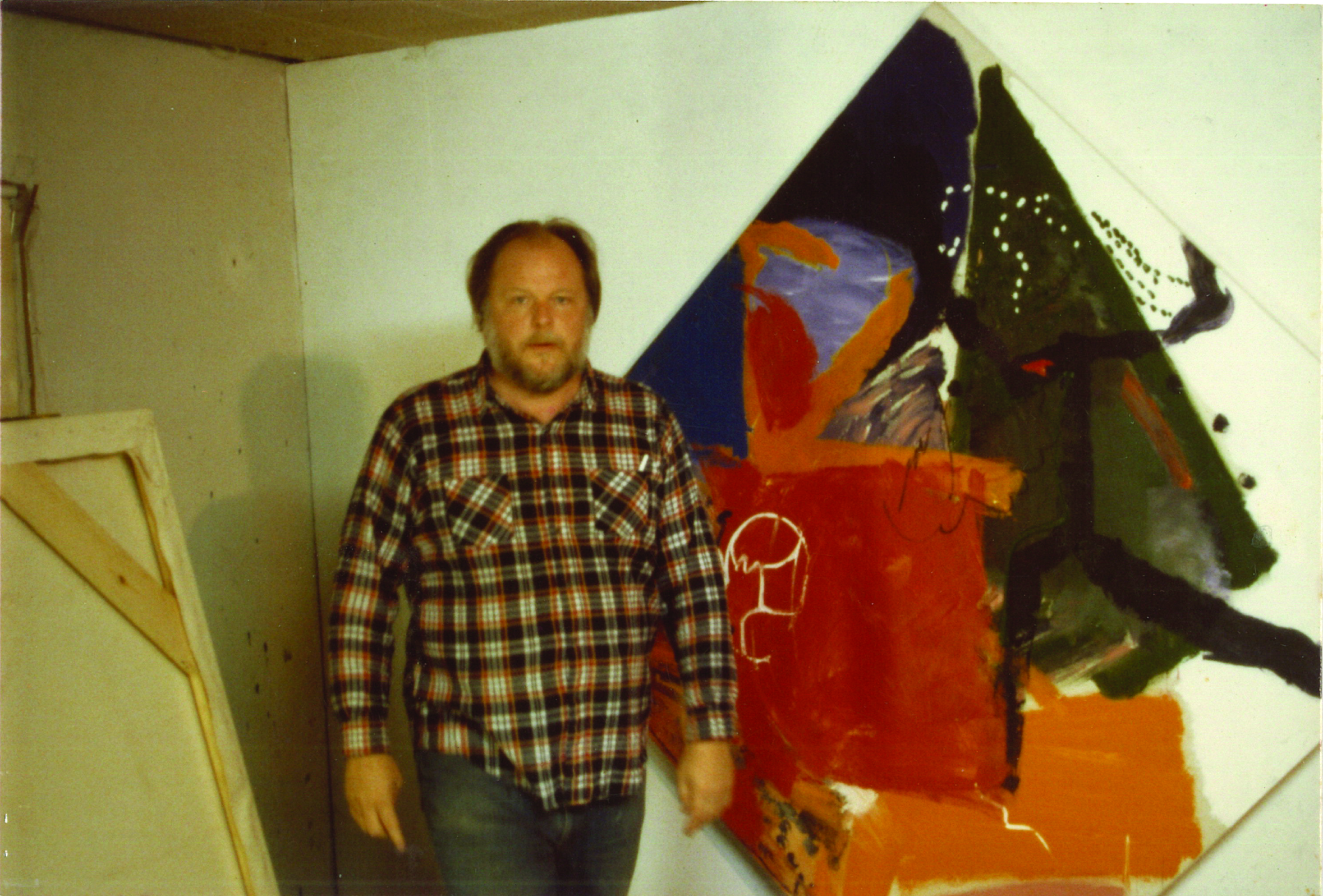
Blaine Larson in his studio

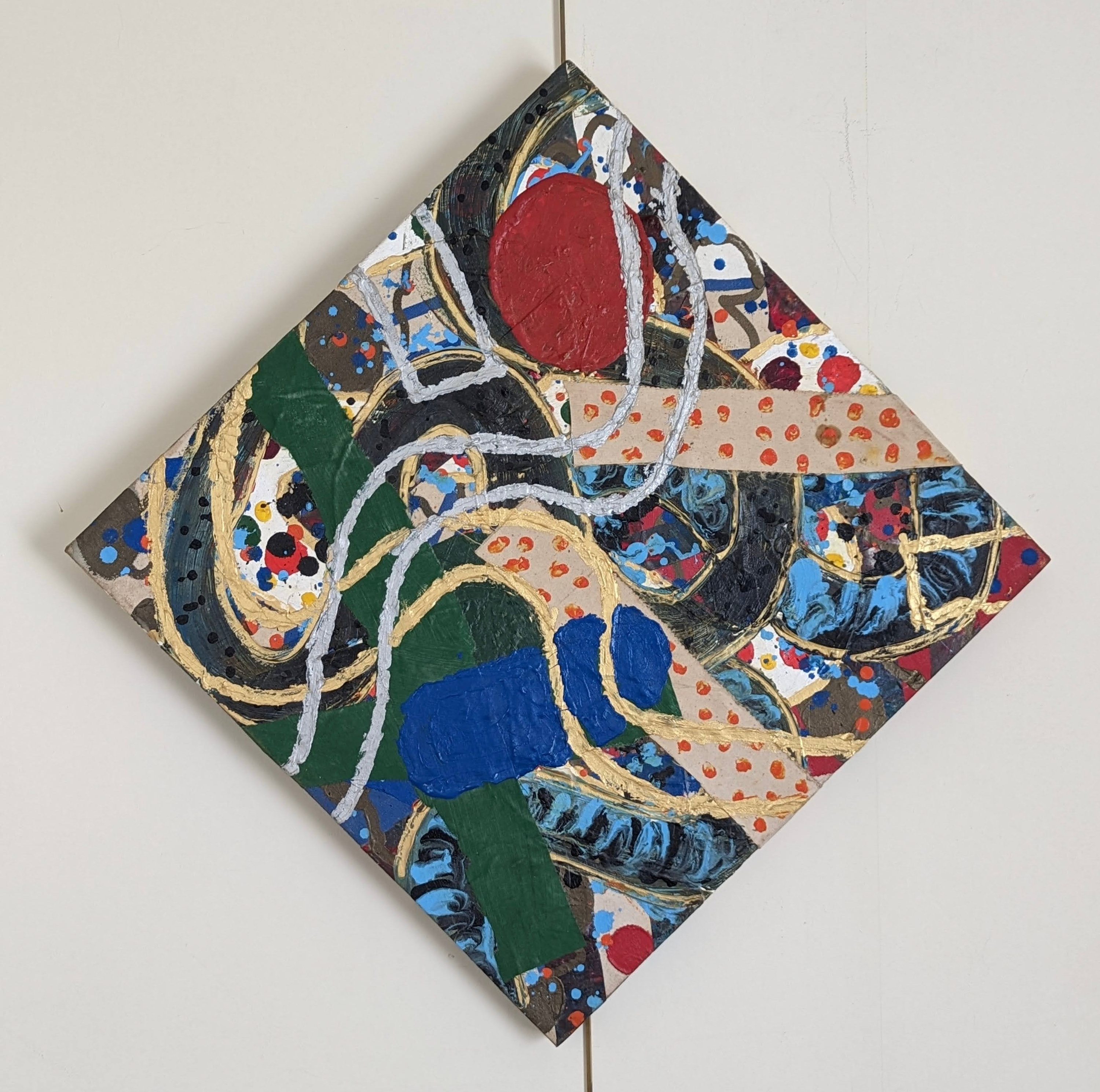
Kionia acrylic on stretched canvas 1980s 61 x 61 cm

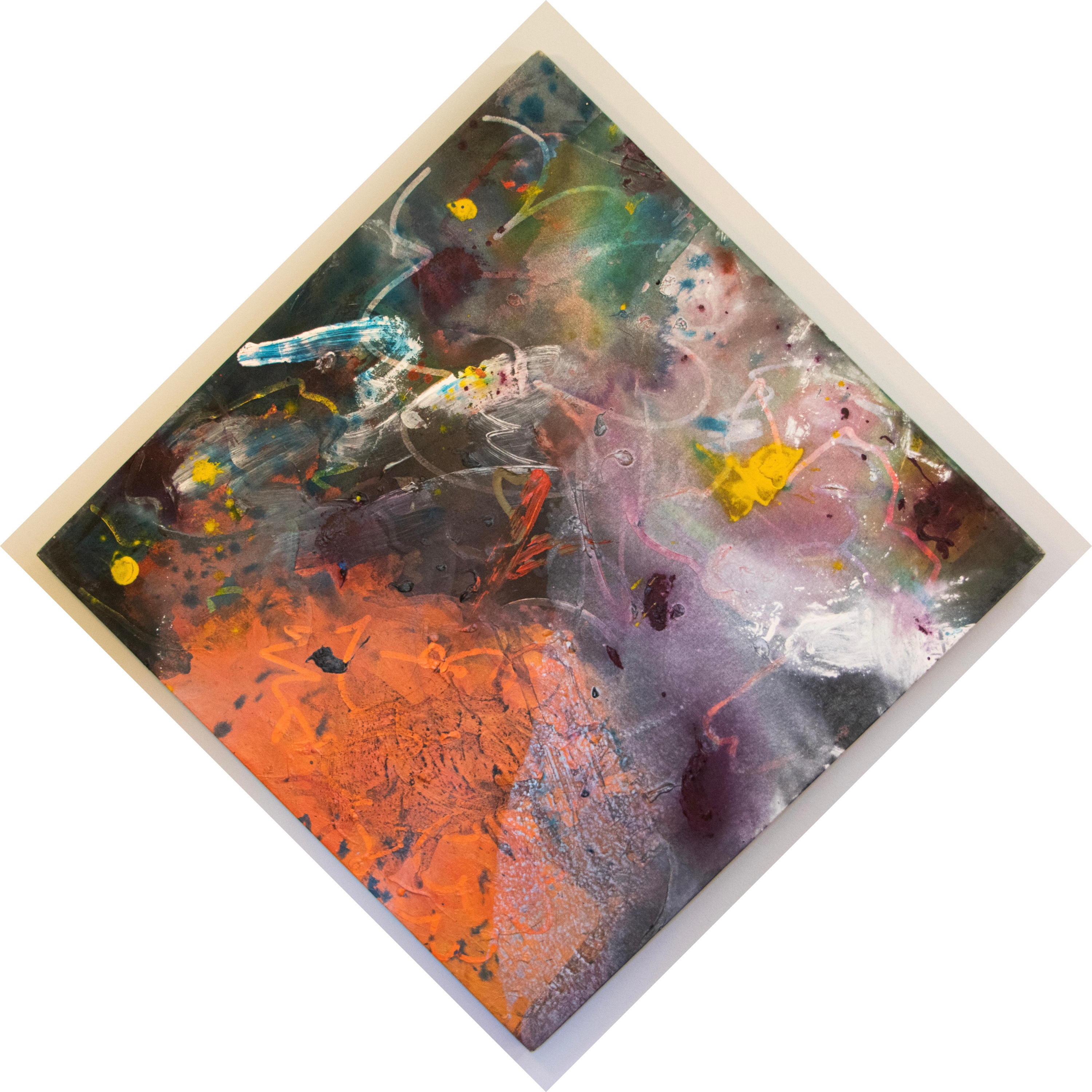
Dobuku 1980s acrylic on stretched canvas 88x88 cm

In the 1980s Larson began using 3-foot and 2-foot square canvases canted 45° and dubbed the "Diamond Paintings". He describes his approach in an interview with Clair List, which is included in Andrew Hudson’s Ongoing Dialogue: “I utilized a square format. Experimenting with the squares, I tried a diamond–it seemed a logical possibility. I put the first group on 3-foot square canvases together as diamonds and they became one shaped canvas. I arranged them in a series, horizontally. This wasn’t painting with the same spatial restriction that I had had on my previous work on paper - the paint could spread out along the edges of the diamond and make it seem bigger and relate it to the wall. The shape itself has funny things about it: behind it, there’s an implied rectangle much larger than the actual canvases…arranging the 2-foot canvases horizontally didn’t seem to work. I made a vertical group of two, which took on certain aspects of sculpture. The vertical scale reminded me of people, of African figurative sculpture of Picasso. As a format in itself, it seemed to have a lot of interest.” Andrew Hudson says of Larson’s work of this period in his notes for the 1988 Susan Conway Carroll Gallery Show “his diamonds are unlike any others. His bucolic botanical shapes–most recently spiralling curves, broad paisley contours, wild zigzags that frequently overlap and that sometimes change to resemble the branches of a tree–and his vibrant, explosive colours…push hard against the diamond’s edges, activate the painting to make it seem larger than it is. In between times, Blaine Larson has made some rectangular paintings on Japanese tissue rice paper, remarkable for overlapping colour and texture as different papers are pasted together. Sometimes pieces of canvas from his paintings of twenty years ago appear like mysterious creatures inhabiting a world deep down at the bottom of the sea.”

=== Bronze on Black: 1990s ===
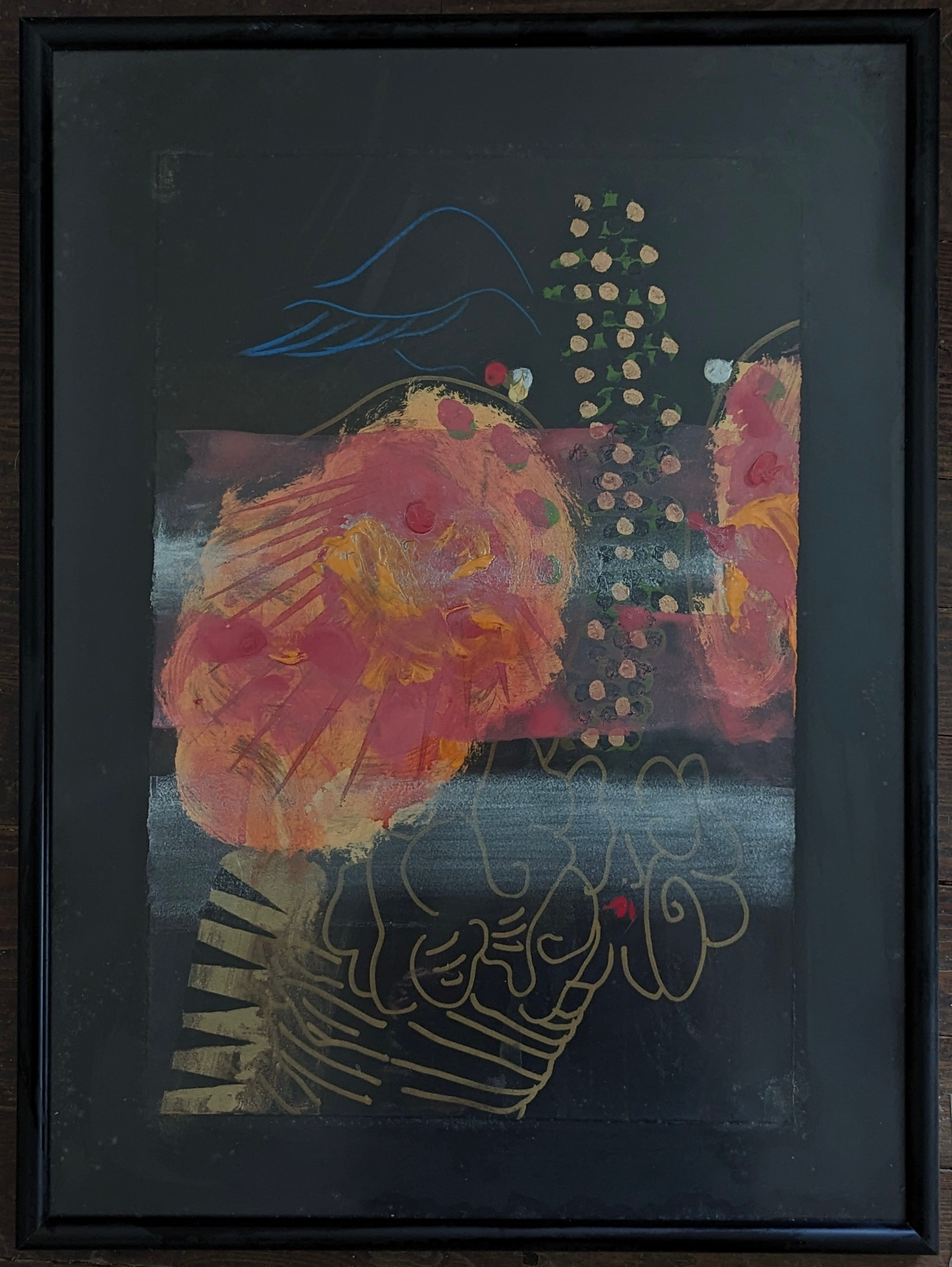
Elefsis (1990s) acrylic on canvas

In the 1990s, Larson’s art took a new turn after Hudson pointed out that a bronze on black diamond painting entitled Acropole, was an unexplored direction. Larson accepted the challenge and started using larger, rectangular canvases, usually hung vertically, and even larger unstretched canvases, “left nakedly on their own, bronze lines drawn on black…Blaine’s wizardry of line and contour…running full tilt, gaining speed and momentum from his vast knowledge of botany, biology, and organic form.”

Larson explains the idea of working with Dante’s Divine Comedy as an inspiration in a letter to his dealer Susan Conway: “The first hint of possible success came when I found a translation of the Inferno (Dante) by Mark Musa, professor of Italian at Indiana University. He has tried to give as much of the original feeling of the Italian as he could rather than turning the Inferno into English poetry. The result is that the visual character is much more obvious. By reading this version and the mythic background of The Greek Myths of Robert Graves, I am now getting a large fund of ideas which I can adapt to painting.”

=== The Late Period: 2007-2022 ===
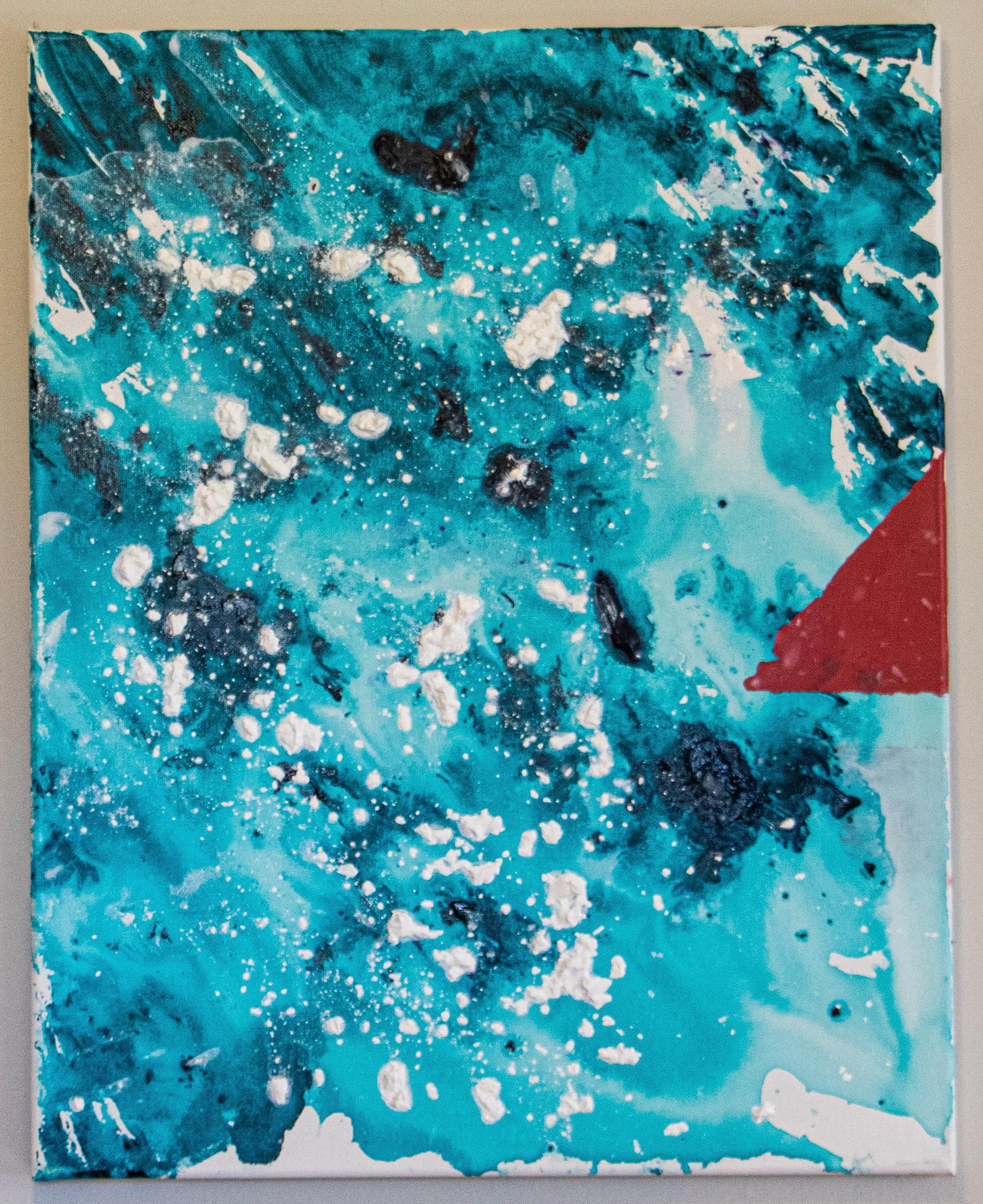
Stromness 2000s acrylic on stretched canvas 41x51 cm

Coinciding with the relocation to Phenix, Virginia, in 2007, Larson began painting with acrylics on smaller (32 x 51 cm and 26 x 36 cm) pre-stretched canvases. With nearly a complete abandonment of line and an emphasis on topical vitality, the application of the paint was more suffuse, distributed, and amorphic, the elaborate organic shapes of his earlier works giving way to only an occasional smattering of triangles and rectangles.

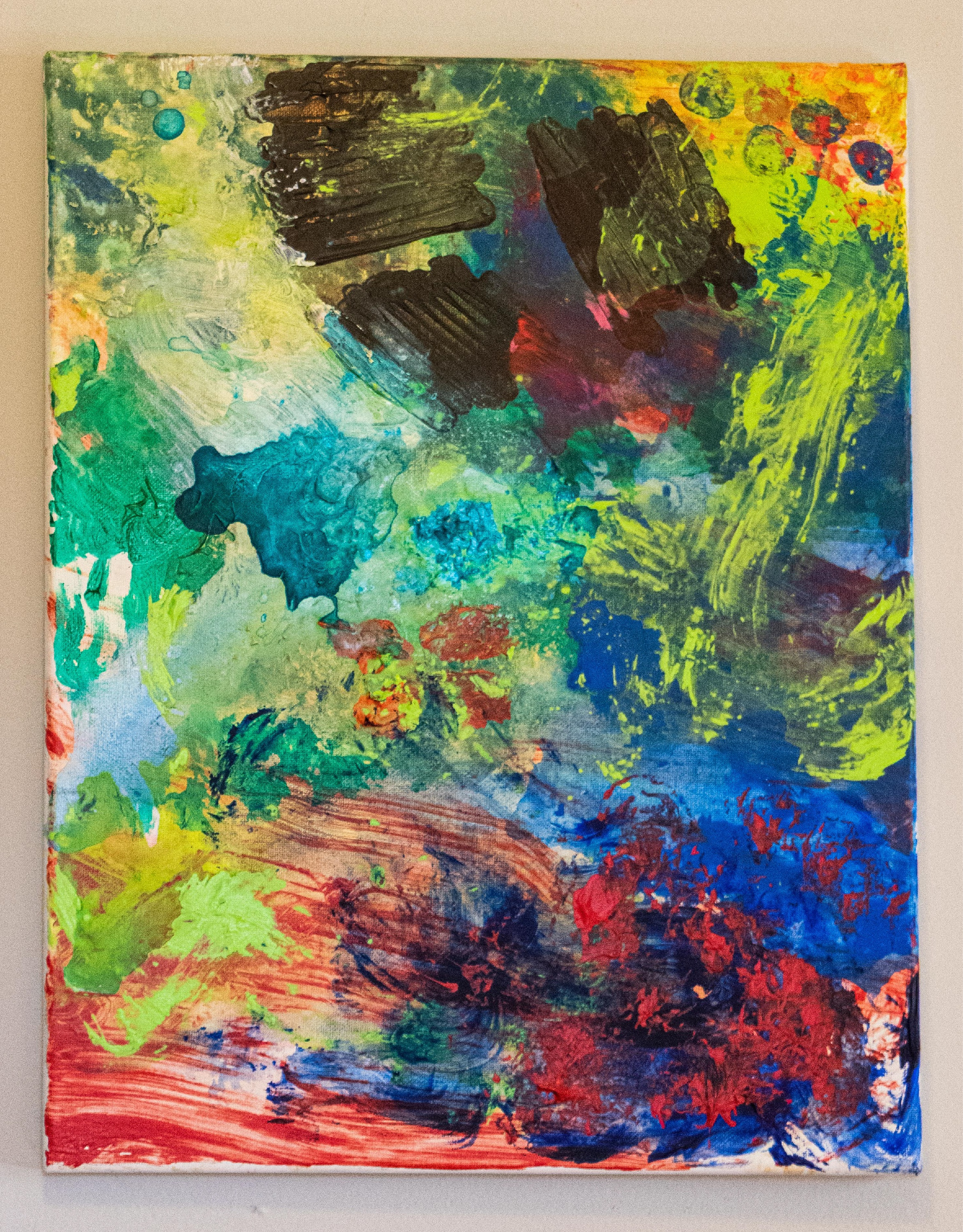
Cargèse 1980s arylic on canvas 36x31 cm

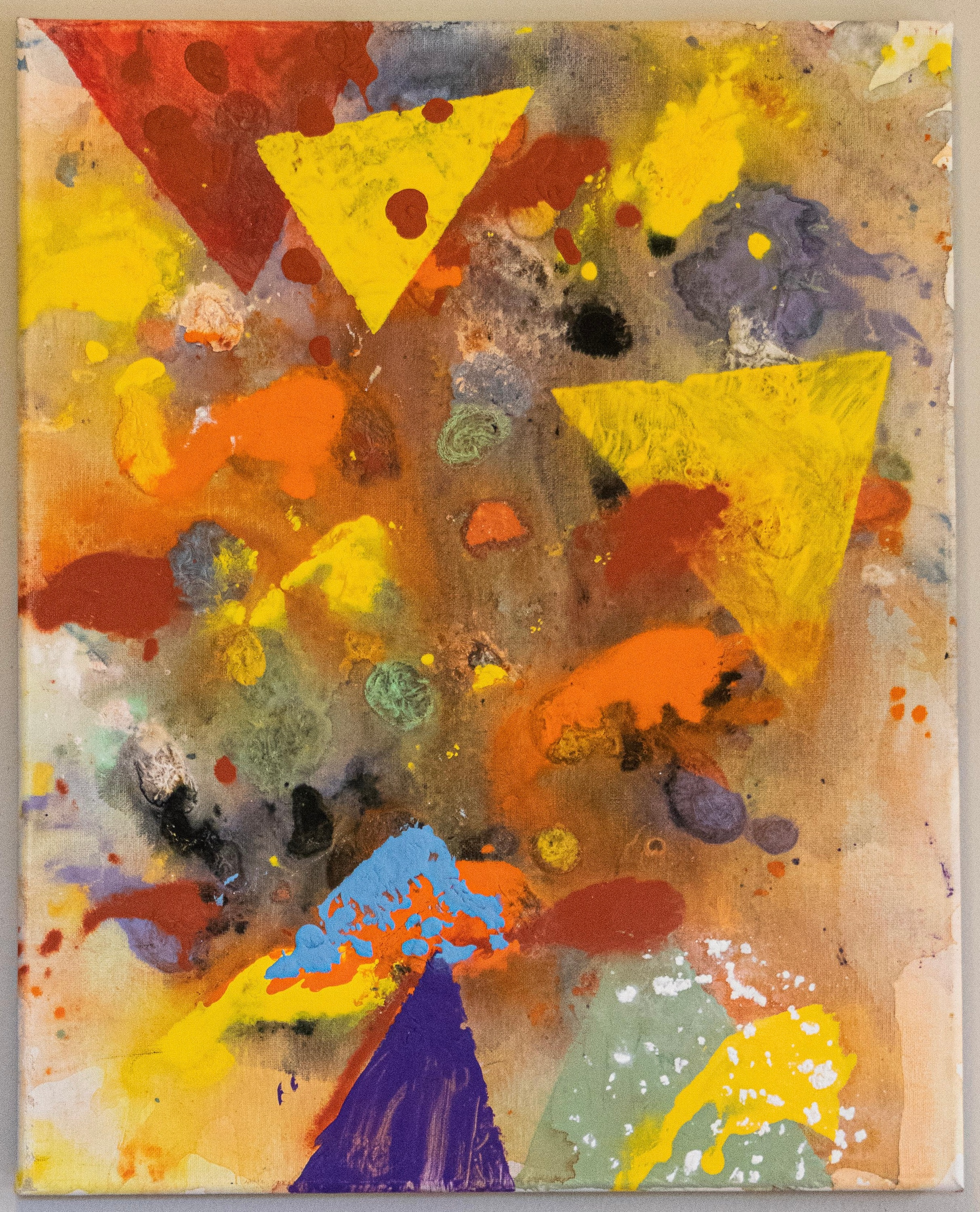
Zacatecas 2000s acrylic on stretched canvas 41x51 cm

== Death and legacy ==
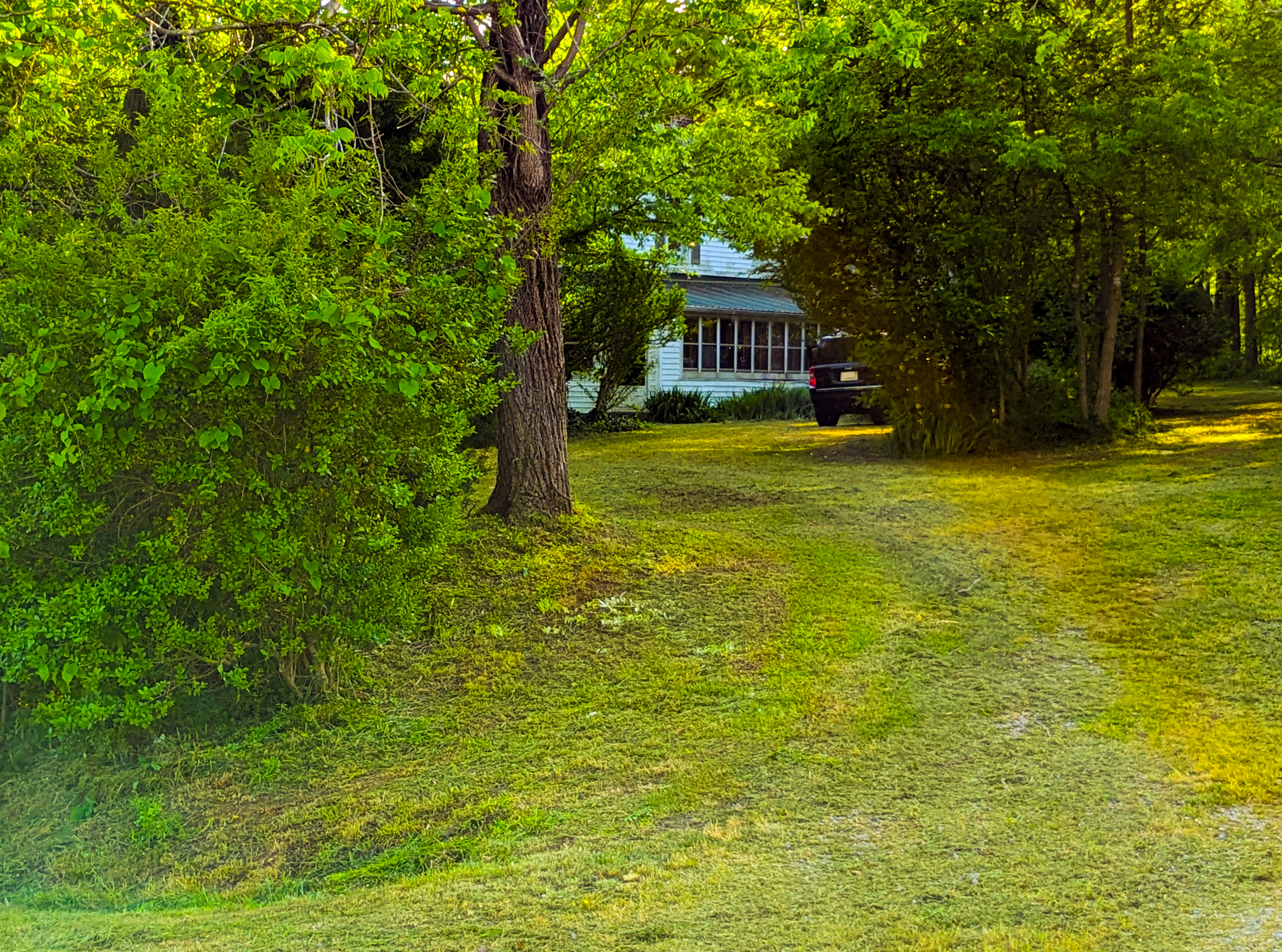
Larson Phenix residence and studios

Larson died on November 24, 2022, at his home and studio in Phenix in Charlotte County, Virginia. Larson's work is included in the Corcoran Legacy Collection at American University.
