= Jefferson Place Gallery =

Coordinates: 38.907016°N 77.042002°W

- Formation: 1957
- Dissolved: October 1, 1974
- Type: arts organization, art gallery
- Headquarters: 1216 Connecticut Street, NW, Washington, D.C., United States
- Key people: William Howard Calfee, Robert Franklin Gates, Helene Herzbrun, Mary Orwen, Ben Summerford, Alice Denney, Nesta Dorrance

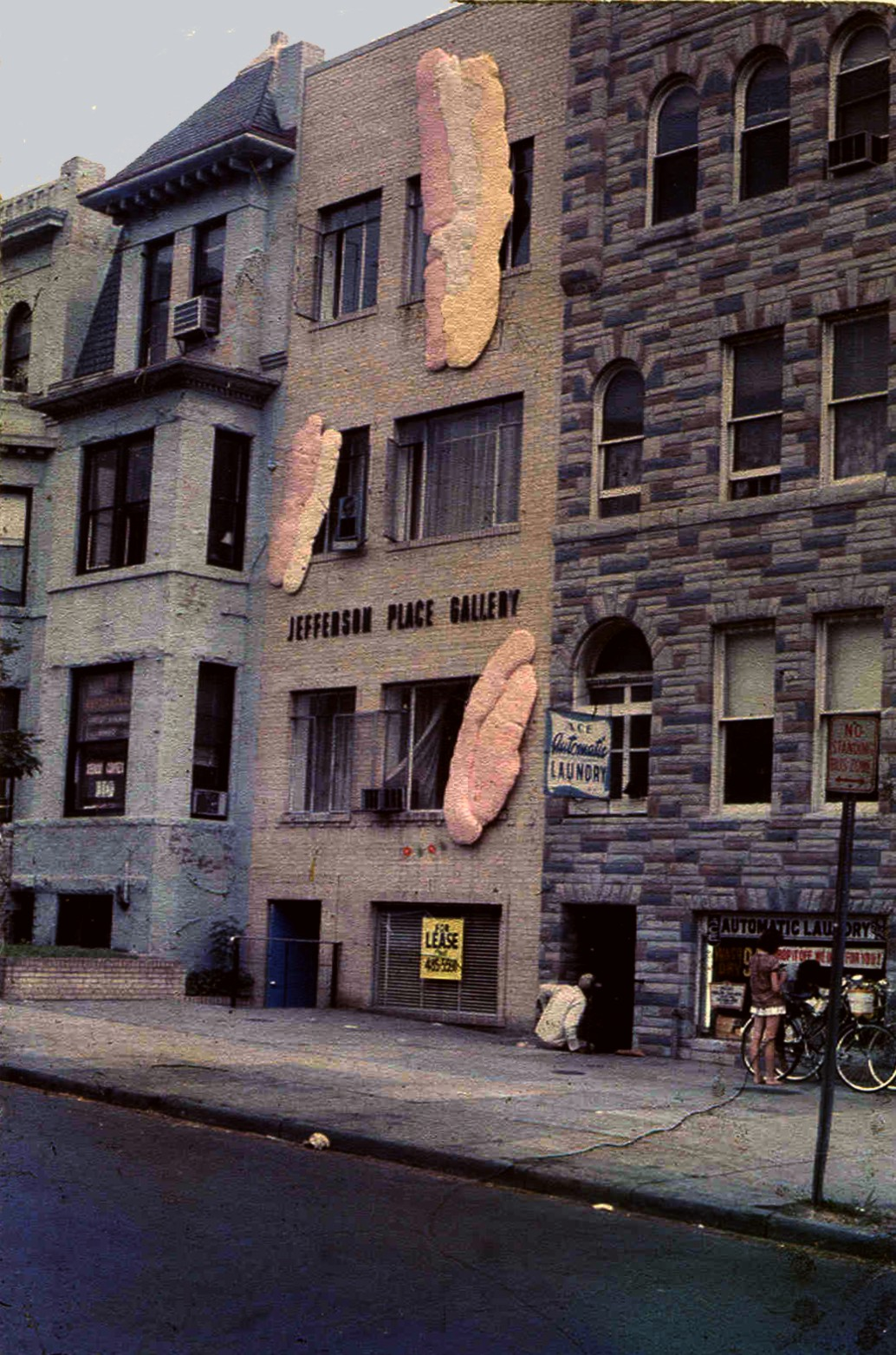
Jefferson Place Gallery with Foam Works (1972) by Ed Zerne

The Jefferson Place Gallery was an art gallery in Washington, D.C., founded in 1957 and closed in 1974. It had been located at 1216 Connecticut Street, NW in Washington, D.C.. The gallery was associated with the Washington Color School artists.

== History ==
The Jefferson Place Gallery was initially founded in 1957 as a cooperative gallery, by five current and former art professors at American University, William Howard Calfee, Robert Franklin Gates, Helene Herzbrun, Mary Ryan Orwen, and Ben Summerford. Alice Denney, served as the first gallery director. Other artists who joined the cooperative in 1957 were George Bayliss, Lothar Brabanski, Colin Greenly, Leonard Maurer, Kenneth Noland, and Baltimore-based artist Shelby Shackelford.

Nesta Dorrance acquired the gallery from Alice Denney in 1961, when she left to organize the Washington Gallery of Modern Art. Dorrance ran it until it closed in October 1974.

== Legacy ==
The gallery exhibited "advanced art" and was associated with Washington Color School, a color field, post-painterly abstraction and lyrical abstraction for a number of years, and was a major Washington outlet for that art.

The competitors in contemporary art with Nesta Dorrance's Jefferson Place Gallery were Henri Gallery [Henrietta Ersham], Pyramid Gallery [Ramon Osuna and Luis Lastra] and later, Protetch-Rivkin Gallery [Max Protetch and Harold Rivkin].

== Artists ==
Some artists who also exhibited at Jefferson Place Gallery: Antoinette Pinchot Bradlee, William Christenberry, Gene Davis, Willem De Looper, William Eggleston, Sam Gilliam, John Gossage, Valerie Hollister, Sheila Isham, Jennie Lea Knight, Rockne Krebs, Blaine Larson, Howard Mehring, Mary Pinchot Meyer, David Moy, Roberto Polo, V. V. Rankine, Paul Reed (artist), Eric Rudd, Yuri Schwebler, Roy Slade, D. Jack Solomon, David Staton, Elliot Thompson, Hilda Shapiro Thorpe, Frederic Matys Thursz, Franklin White, John P. Wise, Mary Orwen, Carroll Sockwell, and Ed Zerne.
