= Mary Orwen =

American painter

- Mary Orwen in 1959 (Jefferson Place Gallery)
- Born: Mabel Claflin Ryan; August 11, 1913; Connecticut
- Died: October 9, 2005 (aged 92); Rochester, New York
- Resting place: Mount Hope Cemetery, Rochester
- Known for: Artist, art teacher

Mary Orwen (1913–2005) was an American artist known for paintings that appeared to be completely abstract but were usually inspired by objects in the natural world. Her goal, as she put it, was to "find an echo in the visible world of the order which I feel exists beneath the complexity of life." She spent much of her career painting and teaching art in and around Washington, D.C., and was a principal co-founder of an artists' cooperative called Jefferson Place Gallery, that one critic called "a gallery for serious creative work of progressive character" and that Orwen said would demonstrate that the city was not just a provincial backwater.

== Early life and education ==
Brought up in Brooklyn, Orwen attended the Packer Collegiate Institute in Brooklyn Heights and then Mount Holyoke College from which she graduated in 1935. Between 1935 and 1937, she took art classes at the Art Students League, where she studied with Reginald Marsh, Harry Sternberg, and William Zorach. After that, she studied at The New School where she studied with Camilo Egas. She spent much of 1937 studying fresco and painting at the University of Florence. The following two years she received a pair of scholarships from the Guggenheim Foundation to pursue a type of abstract painting that was then called nonobjective art. (Note: Wassily Kandinsky is credited with invention of the term "non-objective" in 1913. Often spelled without the hyphen, the term refers to paintings that contain no readily identifiable references to objects that occur in nature.)

== Career in art ==
(1) Installation view, "Women of Jefferson Place Gallery", Cody Gallery, Marymount University, 2019

(2) Installation view, "Women of Jefferson Place Gallery", Cody Gallery, Marymount University, 2019

An emerging artist in New York in 1939, Orwen’s interest in the emotion of non-objective painting convinced her to abandon all other art. Her work caught the eye of Hilla Rebay, founding director of the Museum of Non-Objective Painting (now the Solomon R. Guggenheim Museum), where Orwen would eventually exhibit in 1940 and 1942.

— Curator's statement, "Mary Orwen: Women of Jefferson Place Gallery", an exhibition held Jun 6 – August 30, 2019.

In 1940, 1941, and 1942 Orwen participated in exhibitions held at the Museum of Non-Objective Painting (predecessor of the Guggenheim Museum). During the early war years, she continued to paint and later was employed as an economic analyst by the War Department. During this period, she divided her time between Washington, D.C., and her parents' home in Westport, Connecticut. Following her marriage to Gifford P. Orwen, she moved to Washington, D.C., where he was then working for the State Department. Within a few months of her arrival, she became an associate in the art department at American University, then considered to be (as a critic at the time stated) "the principal experimental center for the visual arts in Washington". She and thirteen other art department associates participated in an exhibition at the city's United Nations Club in September 1948. In May of the following year, she took first prize and was named "Artist of Tomorrow" in an exhibition at the Whyte Gallery in Washington, DC, and in November won a prize in an exhibition of Washington area artists at the Corcoran Gallery of Art. In 1950, she was given a solo exhibition in the gallery of Washington's Dupont Theater. She showed seventeen paintings in oil, gouache, tempera, and ink in this, her first solo show. A year later, she showed with fourteen other painters in a show at the Whyte Gallery and again won a prize at an exhibition of local artists at the Corcoran, this time, a second prize for a drawing. She was named "Artist of Tomorrow" In 1952, she participated in group exhibitions at the Baltimore Museum of Art, Dupont Theater gallery, and the National Museum of Natural History, the latter having been sponsored by the Society of Washington Artists. 1953 proved to be an unusually busy year for her. She participated in group shows in the Dupont Theater gallery, the Garden Gate gallery in Georgetown and was given a solo exhibition in the Watkins Gallery of American University.

Over the next few years, Orwen's paintings continued to appear in group exhibitions in Washington galleries, including Watkins Gallery (1955), Playhouse Gallery (1955, 1958)), Corcoran Gallery (1955), and Franz Bader Gallery (1956). She also took prizes in exhibitions staged by the Society of Washington Artists in 1956 and 1957.

In the latter year, she joined with four other area artists and an arts administrator to establish a cooperative art gallery. In addition to Orwen, the founders were William Calfee, Robert Gates, Helene McKinsey, Ben Summerford, and Alice Denney. The four artists were all associated with the American University art department. Denney had been a student there but had decided to become an arts promoter rather than an artist. She became the gallery's director and artists' agent. Orwen and Denney signed the lease and all five signed an agreement to fund the project. The founders invited other area artists to join the project including Lothar Brabansky, Colin Greenly, Kenneth Noland, George Bayliss, and Shelby Shackleford. Over the next five years, Orwen would participate in three solo and seventeen group shows at the gallery. In 1958, the Evening Star's art critic called the gallery a place for "serious creative work of progressive character". Orwen's exhibits there drew critical praise and attracted buyers.

In 1961, Orwen and her family moved to West Virginia, and she, then an art instructor at Bethany College, participated in an exhibition with twelve other art teachers at Grove City College in nearby Pennsylvania. Despite the move, she also continued to exhibit in at the Jefferson Place Gallery (a solo in 1967) and at the Baltimore Museum of Art (in a major review called "Twenty Years of Washington Art" in 1970). Not long after the move to West Virginia, Orwen and her family moved again, this time to Geneseo, New York, and she began to show in that vicinity, starting with a show at the annual Western New York art exhibition held in March 1964 at the Albright–Knox Art Gallery. There, a painting of hers called "Sea Chant No. 4" was one of many prize winners. Over the next twenty-five years, she participated in group and solo exhibitions at commercial galleries as well as museums and other non-profit organizations in the Rochester region. Notable exhibitions include solo shows at the Oxford Gallery in Rochester (1974), the Rochester Branch of the American Association of University Women (1983), and the Arts and Cultural Council for Greater Rochester (1991). In 1978, Watkins Gallery of American University gave her a solo exhibition. The following year and in 2001 she contributed paintings to group exhibitions in New York commercial galleries (David Findlay, 1999, and Gary Snyder, 2001). In 2019, Cody Gallery, Marymount University, presented an exhibition of Orwen's paintings. The show was the second in a series called "Women of Jefferson Place Gallery". Others in the series included Jennie Lea Knight and Hilda Thorpe. Installation views from the Orwen exhibit are shown above.

Orwen died at home on October 14, 2005.

=== Art instructor ===
Between 1952 and 1959, Orwen held a teaching position at a private women's college in Washington called Mount Vernon Seminary and during that time she taught at least one summer session in the art department at American University. After moving to West Virginia in the early 1960s, she taught at Bethany College, a co-ed liberal arts school in the town of that name. In 1962, after she and her family moved to Geneseo, New York, she taught painting at the University of Rochester Memorial Art Gallery and design at the Rochester Institute of Technology. From 1973 to 1980, she also taught at the State University of New York at Geneseo. She ended her teaching career in 1983 when she retired from her position at the Memorial Art Gallery.

=== Artistic style ===
(1) Mary Orwen, 1st Phase, 1939, watercolor, 9 x 14 inches

(2) Mary Orwen, Waterfront, about 1950, oil on board, 7 1/4 x 9 1/4 inches

(3) Mary Orwen, Untitled, 1958, acrylic on canvas, 16 1/2 x 12 1/2 inches

(4) Mary Orwen, Burnam Wood, about 1960, acrylic on canvas, 35 x 50 inches

My pictures grow out of a desire to find an echo in the visible world of the order which I feel exists beneath the complexity of life. I should like to translate into an organic form sensations of space which seem to suggest this inner rhythm. For me, these sensations are more evident in the tension and movement between forms and colors than in the analysis of form itself. In this pursuit the glob of paint, the drip, the patch of color are all legitimate tools.

— Mary Orwen, Exhibition Catalog, Jefferson Place Gallery, Members' Show, April 1959.

During the summer months of 1939, the art pages of The New York Times contained articles and letters-to-the-editor on what came to be called the nonobjective art controversy. The debate turned on both terminology and aesthetics. Writers discussed how nonobjective paintings differed from other abstract works. They considered whether nonobjective art could affect the viewer the way music affects the listener and they asked whether it could convey motion. Attempting a summation, the Times art editor, Edward Alden Jewell, said abstract art referred to objects in the natural world while nonobjective art did not. He said there were two types of nonobjective art, one that was strictly geometrical and lacking in emotional content and the other that was lyrical and expressive. He maintained that nonobjective art could be "highly imaginative" and beautiful, however, he rejected two assertions by the curator of the Guggenheim Museum (then called the Museum of Non-Objective Painting), Hilla Rebay, the first that representational art was "relative" while nonobjective are was "absolute" and the second that the goal of nonobjective art was to express "cosmic rhythm" and "a feeling of spirituality".

Orwen was one of the artists who contributed to this discussion. As recipient of a Guggenheim scholarship in 1939, Orwen was no doubt familiar with Rebay's views. In her letter to the Times on the subject, she focused on the expressiveness of nonobjective painting. She said, "When I started to paint non-objectively I was naturally interested to read your views on this subject. I was never more surprised than to find the one thing you thought it lacked was emotion, which to me is the one thing it has so much of, and the reason I gave up the other art for it."

Orwen's earliest paintings were nonobjective according to Jewell's definition of lyrical and expressive nonobjective art. "1st Phase (1939, shown above, No. 1) is an example. However, her mature style was, by Jewell's definition, abstract. Almost all her paintings were abstracted renderings of the natural world. In 1953, a critic for The Washington Post said her mature style was on a "borderline between semiabstraction and abstraction", adding that, "The paintings at first glance seem nonrepresentational, but closer study reveals the subject matter clearly projected, and the work ends by seeming a most naturalistic expression, within a highly personal, rather amorphous technique." On another occasion, this critic wrote, "Mary Orwen in particular has evolved a personal approach, using a misty, amorphous treatment of abstract forms, which resolve themselves into intimate little scenes of domesticity once the title of a picture is known." Another critic said her paintings might at first glance appear to be nonobjective, but added, "if the visitor studies them attentively, he will be able to discern the subjects mistily as through a fog." Examples of paintings that reveal their subjects on close inspection include "Waterfront" (about 1950, shown above, No. 2), the untitled painting of 1958 (shown above, #3), and "Burnam Wood" (about 1960, shown above, No. 4).

In 1956, a critic labeled her paintings "color-patch abstractions" and a year later another called them "'tachist' color impressions". Explaining her technique in 1959, Orwen said she was seeking to convey rhythmic patterns that exist "beneath the complexity of life." By means of "the glob of paint, the drip, the patch of color," she said she aimed to depict the "sensations of space" (the "tension and movement between forms and colors"). At this time, she also used a quote by Henri Matisse to convey her search for the "essential character" of her subjects so as to give a "lasting interpretation" by means of her paintings.

Over the course of her career, Orwen worked in oil, watercolor, gouache, tempera, ink, and acrylic. She used brush, impasto knife, and pen. She also made collages.

== Personal life and family ==
Orwen was born in New York on August 11, 1913. Her birth name was Mabel Claflin Ryan. (Note: The obituary of Orwen's father, Edgar E. Ryan, establishes that she was his daughter, that her mother was Alice Clarkson Ryan, and that she had two brothers, David and Donald. The birth notice for David and Donald establishes that her birth name was Mabel Claflin Ryan. There is further evidence that her given name was Mabel in notices on the Society pages of the Brooklyn Daily Eagle.) Her parents were Edgar Edwin Ryan (1882–1952) and Alice Clarkson Ryan (born 1886). Egar Ryan was a successful merchant, a shoe salesman who became president of a chain of shoe stores. Alice Ryan was active in the kinds of civic events that got reported in the society pages of local newspapers. Orwen had twin younger brothers, David and Donald, born in 1930.

During World War II, she was employed as an economic analyst for an intelligence branch of the War Department. In 1947, she married Gifford P. Orwen (1909–1997), who was then working for the State Department and had been in Army intelligence during the war. Gifford came from Rochester, New York. Educated at the University of Rochester, Cornell University, he did post-doctoral research at the University of Perugia, and the University of Strasbourg. He taught Romance Languages at Cornell prior to World War II, and, after his service in Army intelligence and at the State Department, taught Russian in Bethany College. He ended his career at the State University of New York in Geneseo as chair of the foreign languages department. The couple had one son, Michael, born in 1951.

=== Other names used ===
She called herself Mabel Ryan until sometime after she graduated from Mount Holyoke in 1935. When she returned from a trip to Europe in 1937, she gave her name as Mary Ryan.
