= Jennie Knight =

Jennie Knight may refer to:

- Jennie B. Knight, leader in the Church of Jesus Christ of Latter-day Saints
- Jennie Lea Knight, American sculptor
