= Helene Herzbrun =

American painter

- Born: Helen Eichenbaum; October 5, 1921; Chicago, Illinois
- Died: March 14, 1984 (aged 62); Washington, D.C.

Helene Herzbrun (1921–1984) was an American artist who lived and worked within the art community in Washington, D.C. A student and friend of Jack Tworkov, she was a second-generation abstract expressionist who developed a personal style that set her apart from the Color School movement of her time. She was known for abstract landscapes having bold colors and employing gestural brushwork. She was also said to possess an ability to create the illusion of depth without employing graphical perspective. As well as painting, Herzbrun enjoyed a long career gallery administrator and professor of art at American University.

== Early life and training ==
Herzbrun was born in Chicago on October 5, 1921. Her birth name was recorded as Helen Eichenbaum. Her father was Edward Eichenbaum (1894–1982), an architect known for designing 1920s movie palaces and for his skill at dramatic readings. Her mother was Lillian Smith Eichenbaum (born about 1891, died 1969), a housewife and officer of the South Shore Women's Club. She had no brothers or sisters. A transcription of her birth certificate gives her name as Helen Ruth Eichenbaum.

After graduating from Hirsch High School in Chicago, she briefly attended Beloit College and subsequently the University of Chicago where she studied art and from which she obtained a Bachelor of Arts degree in English. (Note: "Hirsch," "Beloit" and "University of Chicago," "studied art," "degree in English.") She also took classes at the Art Institute of Chicago. In 1941 Herzbrun, then known as Helene Eichenbaum, was an artist and member of the Ida Noyes Council at the University of Chicago, an organization that staged the university's annual student art show. In 1942 she married a fellow student, Robert James McKinsey, in a chapel on campus at the university of Chicago. He was then studying for a law degree. He later earned his living as a lawyer and raced sports cars as an avocation.

In the late 1940s she worked as an advertising copy writer and designer. In the early 1950s, now living in the Washington, D.C. metropolitan area, she studied at American University under Jack Tworkov, Robert Gates, and Joe Summerford, all of whom became colleagues and friends during her subsequent career. (Note: On returning from World War II service in the U.S. Navy, Summerford studied at the Phillips Gallery Art School which was then operated in association with American University. After winning a Fulbright fellowship to study in Paris he joined the American University faculty in 1949. Although known as Joe, his birth name was Ben Long Summerford. He specialized in oil paintings of table top still lifes and spent his entire teaching career at the university.) Gates and Summerford were year-round instructors at the school while Tworkov taught there during the summer months between 1948 and 1951. (Note: The American University full- and part-time faculty in 1948 consisted of William Calfee (head), Sarah Baker, Robert Gates, Pietro Lazzari, Leo Steppat, Joe Summerford, John Galloway, and Jack Tworkov.)

In the summer of 1961 she divorced McKinsey and that fall married Philip Herzbrun, an English professor at Georgetown University. Herzbrun wrote her friend Tworkov that when she provoked the divorce, McKinsey was nice about it and there were few recriminations. The ceremony, which took place in Moorefield, West Virginia, drew attention as the first civil ceremony ever performed in that state. (Note: A transcription of Herzbrun's birth certificate gives her name as Helen Ruth Eichenbaum. During her life her given name appeared as both Helen and Helene. After her second marriage she was sometimes called Helene McKinsey Herzbrun.)

=== Other names ===
Although Helen sometimes appeared in print as Herzbrun's given name, Helene was more common. During her first marriage she was called Helene McKinsey. During the second one she was called either Helene Herzbrun or Helene McKinsey Herzbrun. If she had a middle name, it was either Ruth, as shown on the transcribed birth certificate, or Marie, as given in a legal notice from her estate in 1983 and on the West Virginia wedding registry.

== Art career ==
In 1952, during the last year of her studies at American University, Herzbrun participated in a group a group exhibition at the Whyte Gallery in Washington. (Note: Specializing in 20th-century paintings, the Whyte Gallery was founded in 1938 by Donald Whyte. It was located over a bookstore run by his brother James and was said to be the first "first-rate" gallery in Washington.) The gallery's owner assembled the show by soliciting recommendations from local newspaper art critics. At the time a critic for The Washington Post wrote that Herzbrun's painting, "Andante," was a well-composed abstraction. Another critic said she showed "unusual competence and understanding of a difficult medium." In 1953 she was the only Washingtonian to have work included in the 23rd Corcoran Biennial held that year. In 1954 she showed a small group of paintings in a suburban movie theater, an exhibition that was notable only in the review it drew from a local critic who called Herzbrun an outstanding artist. Two years later she was featured in a two-artist exhibition at the Watkins Gallery. (Note: In 1945 American University founded the Watkins Gallery following the death of art professor and department chair, C. Law Watkins. Its foundational holdings came from donations by collector and gallery owner, Duncan Phillips, and, through his influence, from the collection of Katherine Dreier. With the opening of the Katzen Arts Center in 2005, the gallery's collections were made part of the new American University Museum.)

In 1957 Herzbrun helped found an artists' cooperative called the Jefferson Place Gallery. She and a fellow student at American University originally came up with the idea for what became the first gallery in Washington to be collectively owned and run by local artists. Eight others joined with them, all of them abstract artists. (Note: The other artists were Robert Gates, Mary Orwen, Lothar Brabansky, William Calfee, Colin Greenly, Ken Noland, George Bayliss, and Shelby Shackleford.) At the time, Herzbrun wrote Tworkov that the venture was an "honorable" place to exhibit: a gallery run by artists among the city's bookshops, espresso cafés, and jewelry stores. Herzbrun participated in group and solo exhibitions in the gallery from the time it opened until 1974 when it closed.

Between 1953 and 1958 Herzbrun managed American University's Watkins Gallery Thereafter she joined the art faculty at the university, beginning a career that lasted until her death in 1984. In 1958 she was given a solo exhibition at the Stable Gallery in New York. The following year her paintings appeared in a three-person exhibition at the Corcoran Gallery in which almost all her paintings were either sold or reserved by collectors. A year later the Poindexter Gallery gave her a solo show that resulted in the sale of a big painting to Lila Wallace for the Reader's Digest art collection. (Note: Elinor Poindexter opened the Poindexter gallery in 1955 and closed it in 1978. She specialized in showing new work by lesser-known abstract artists outside the mainstream including West Coast artists and a significant number of women.) (Note: Beginning in the 1940s and continuing until her death in 1984, the magazine's co-owner, Lila Acheson Wallace, amassed a collection of modern art that included works by Cézanne, Braque, Bonnard, Chagall, and many other famous artists. Maintaining that beauty and business could coexist, Wallace had the paintings hung throughout the Reader's Digest headquarters in hallways, reception areas, conference rooms, and offices.)

In 1969, roughly at the midpoint of her career, Herzbrun expressed her dislike for the commercial requirements of a career in art. On December 7 of that year she wrote Jack Tworkov "After a year—to change subject abruptly—I almost have enough paintings for a show, some of which I'm really pleased about. But I have doubts about showing them, only because I really don't want the guff. I hate to have to argue their value or defend their merit having done all I could by painting them. But I probably will."

The following year one of Herzbrun's paintings was included in a Baltimore Museum of Art exhibition that was intended to give a comprehensive overview of the Washington scene over the previous two decades. Paul Richard, a critic for The Washington Post, gave this show an intemperate review, calling it insensitive, haphazard, and incoherent. In it he said Herzbrun's painting was an "eye-curdling canvas." His view of a solo exhibition of hers some four years later was considerably more positive, describing the show as a happy one and her paintings as "colorful and free and bright." Two years later the Corcoran chose Herzbrun along with John Robinson and Alma Thomas for a show called "Contemporary Washington Art" that was sponsored by the American Revolution Bicentennial Administration. (Note: John N. Robinson (1912–1994) was an African-American realist painter who depicted scenes of home life in Washington, D.C.'s Anacostia neighborhood. Largely self-taught, he achieved recognition and success in the local art world while earning his living in the kitchens of St. Elizabeths Hospital.) In 1978 she was given a solo exhibition and in 1980 a three-person exhibition at D.C.'s Rasmussen Gallery. (Note: Jack Rasmussen operated the gallery that bore his name between 1978 and 1983. He was later appointed to direct the art museum at the Katzen Arts Center, American University. The gallery promoted the careers of then unknown regional artists such as William Dutterer, and Mindy Weisel.) The following year cancer forced her to give up painting. Although she made collages for a time, the disease did not leave her and eventually brought about her death in 1984. Posthumous exhibitions include a retrospective at the Watkins Gallery and a 2019 presentation called "Grace Hartigan and Helene Herzbrun: Reframing Abstract Expressionism" at the American University Art Museum.

=== Artistic style ===
Helene Herzbrun, Landscape (Rising from Purple), about 1958, oil on canvas, 50 1/4 x 68 1/4 inches

Helene Herzbrun, Aeroplat, 1970, acrylic on canvas, 70 x 73 2/4 inches

Helene Herzbrun, Counter Plane, 1977, acrylic on canvas, 50 x 44 inches

Herzbrun made gestural painting in an abstract expressionist style. When a painting of hers was selected for the 23rd Biennial held at the Corcoran Gallery in 1953 critics commented on the circumstances—as noted above, she was the only local artist selected—but not on her style. Three years later, however, a critic for The Washington Post gave a thorough examination to Herzbrun's technique in reviewing a two-person exhibition at the Watkins Gallery. She recognized that, despite their abstraction, the paintings derived from a lyrical view of natural subjects. While earlier ones had possessed "a quality of light and sunshine, with flickering, rapidly moving patters," she said the more recent ones were looser and more expressionist, having bolder patterns and stronger color. Regarding a three-person show at the Corcoran in 1959 this critic commented on Herzbrun's ability to establish the illusion of depth without employing graphical perspective. She said, "Every brush stroke counts as it describes a push-and-pull of tensions in space. She achieves a great sense of depth and distance without recourse to receding planes or colors in the academic sense." A year later a critic for The New York Times saw an "innate refinement" in her work despite an obvious affinity for the loose organization and casual brushwork of the abstract expressionists. Her early painting, "Landscape (Rising from Purple)," shows both the freedom of her gestural brushwork and her ability to convey the illusion of depth (shown at left). A later painting, "Aeroplat," (1970, at right) shows her handling of bold patterns and bright colors, while "Counter Plane" (1977, at left) demonstrates her use of receding planes of color.

In 1961 Herzbrun said she wanted to be more definite in her approach in order to bring out "the idea that's hiding" in her paintings. (Note: This statement appears in a letter she wrote to Jack Tworkov on June 13, 1961. She told him of a surge of painting energy and, regarding works shown in a recent show, said "I want to see if I can be even more definite; make something of the idea that's hiding in those pictures.") Regarding a two-person exhibition at Jefferson Place Gallery, held two years later, the critic for The Washington Post said Herzbrun's work showed integrity and was "unchanged and uninfluenced by the new little 'isms' that sweep the art world each season." She stressed the confidence with which Herzbrun remained committed to her painterly approach with its fresh, clear color and "strong slashing brush strokes" and noted her ability to "create a world of her own" and make it work. Regarding a solo show a few years later a critic for the Washington Star admired the joyful spirit of Herzbrun's abstract landscapes and saw in them "the broad strokes of totally confident painting echoing the ancient simplicities of fold, fallow and field." Commenting on this show, another critic stressed her technique, saying that Herzbrun produced a fresh surface of bright colors using "matte finish, glazes, impasto areas and delicate lines" all on the same canvas without sacrificing unity. During the following decade Herzbrun turned from painting on canvas to a printing technique called monotyping in which each sheet pulled was unique. She painted on glass and applied paper to the surface while the pigments were still wet. A review praised the resulting prints as fresh, colorful, free, and bright.

Beginning in 1981, after cancer and subsequent surgery prevented her from painting or making monotypes, she created collages for a time. The disease continued to attack, however, and on March March 14, 1984, it brought about her death.

== Teaching career ==
In 1958, after completing her studies and ending her service as head of the Watkins Gallery, Herzbrun joined faculty of American University as an art instructor. She advanced to assistant professor and professor and was granted emerita status after her death in 1984. She served as head of the art department in 1962, 1966 to 1968, 1972 to 1974 and 1976 to 1978.

After her death her husband, Philip, established the Helene M. Herzbrun Art Scholarship to provide financial support to art students selected by the art faculty.

== Death ==
As noted above, Herzbrun was afflicted with cancer in 1981, underwent surgery, and, on March 14, 1984, succumbed to the disease.
