= Gerald Nordland =

American museum director and art critic (1927–2019)

Gerald Nordland (1927–2019) was an American museum director and art critic.

== Biography ==
Nordland was dean of the Chouinard Art Institute (1960–64), then at the Washington Gallery of Modern Art (1964–1966), the San Francisco Museum of Art (1966–1973), and director of the Milwaukee Art Museum (1977–1985), and the UCLA New Wight Art Gallery (1973–1977). He co-founded Artforum magazine and authored over 60 publications.

== Awards and honours ==
- 1985 Guggenheim Fellow – for Fine Arts Research

== Publications ==
Including co-authored books, and exhibition catalogues:

- Gaston Lachaise, 1882–1935: sculpture and drawings (Los Angeles, 1964)
  - Gaston Lachaise, 1882–1935 (Ithaca, NY, 1974)
- Ray Parker (Washington, 1966)
- Gaston Lachaise: the man and his work (New York, 1974)
- Fourteen abstract painters (Los Angeles, 1975)
- Catalog of the UCLA collection of contemporary American photographs (Los Angeles, 1976)
- Richard Diebenkorn Monotypes (Los Angeles, 1976)
- Alberto Burri: a retrospective view, 1948–77 (Los Angeles, 1977)
- Reuben Nakian: recent works (New York, 1982)
- Ulfert Wilke, a retrospective (Salt Lake City, 1983)
- Richard Diebenkorn (New York, 1987)
- Ynes Johnson (1996)
- Twentieth century American drawings from the Arkansas Arts Center Foundation collection (Little Rock, Ark, 1998)
- Reuben Diebenkorn: revised and expanded (New York, 2001)
- Jon Schueler: to the North (London, 2002)
- Uncompromising Vision: The art of Jack Jefferson (2004)
