= Margaret C. Gates =

American painter (1903–1989)

- photo by F. Goodwin, 1951
- Born: Margaret S. Casey; 1903; Georgetown, Washington, D.C., U.S.
- Died: 1989 (aged 85–86); Mitchellville, Maryland, U.S.
- Other names: Margaret Casey Gates, M. C. Gates
- Occupation(s): artist, art instructor, school administrator
- Years active: 1933–1969
- Spouse: Robert Franklin Gates (m. 1933–1955; divorced)

Margaret Casey Gates (1903–1989) was an American artist, painter, art teacher and administrator. She participated in the New Deal's Section of Painting and Sculpture under the Treasury Department, creating the post office mural for Mebane, North Carolina, and a watercolor which was held at Fort Stanton in New Mexico. In addition, she has paintings held in several noted collections in the United States.

== Early life ==
Margaret S. Casey was born in 1903 in Georgetown, Washington, D. C. to Antonia L. (née Harvey) and James F. Casey. She studied art privately with Bertha Perry, and continued her education between 1924 and 1926 at the Corcoran School of Art. Casey then studied at the Colorado Springs Fine Arts Center, under the tutelage of Henry Varnum Poor.

== Career ==
Beginning her career as a commercial artist, Casey worked in 1928 and 1929, before deciding to continue her education with Charles Law Watkins at the Phillips Memorial Gallery School in 1931. While studying at the Phillips Gallery, Casey met the painter Robert Franklin Gates and the two were married on January 7, 1933. That same year, she was appointed to the teaching faculty of the Phillips Gallery School, where she would serve for the next thirteen years. She also worked as the executive secretary of the gallery.

Between 1934 and 1941, a group of artists, including the Gates, Mitchell Jamieson and Prentiss Taylor began a series of trips as part of a commission by the Treasury Department to the U.S. Virgin Islands. In 1936, Gates produced a series of vivid watercolors, including The White Gate, which featured the decorative patterns formed by wrought iron, ornamental gates against the backdrop of the sun, sand, and native population of St. Thomas. Primarily, she worked in watercolor, oil and tempra, specializing in figures and industrial scenes.

In 1939, Gates won a commission in the competition for the post office mural of Mebane, North Carolina. She executed and installed, Landscape—Tobacco Curing in 1941. The original design had planned a night scene of workers in a curing barn, but in the final painting, the portrayal is depicted during daylight hours. The mural carries the central theme of family and shows a man and a young boy, walking in tandem to work on the tobacco farm. That same year, Live Oaks, a watercolor by Gates was purchased by the government for the federal hospital of Fort Stanton, New Mexico.

In the 1940s and 1950s Gates exhibited regularly. She had works exhibited in the Baltimore Museum of Art, the Bignou Gallery in New York City, Cincinnati Art Museum's Critics Choice Exhibition, the National Gallery of Art, The Phillips Collection, the Richmond Bi-Annual, the Virginia Museum of Fine Arts and with the Society of Washington Painters and Sculptors. With the latter organization, she won a prize in 1945. The following year, she exhibited for Pepsi Cola and had a solo show at the Whyte Gallery in Washington, D. C. In 1948, she mounted an exhibition at the Corcoran Gallery of Art. Over the same decade, Gates wrote articles on art for publications, such as The Washington Spectator, and had a regular column in the journal Right Angle, of the American University, called "The People vs. Art".

From 1948 to 1953, Gates worked at the Watkins Gallery at American University and beginning in 1950, worked as an administrative assistant in the Madeira School. In 1955, Gates and her husband divorced, though she continued to live in the house they had purchased together in McLean, Virginia. She retired in 1969 and in 1980, moved to Mitchellville, Maryland.

== Death and legacy ==
Gates died on November 4, 1989, in Mitchellville, Maryland. Gates' papers were donated by her estate to the Archives of American Art. She has seven works in the permanent holdings of The Phillips Collection and was given a retrospective by the Watkins Memorial Collection at the American University of Washington, D. C. in 1981. The Watkins collection includes some of her work.
