= Colin Greenly =

American visual artist (1928–2014)

- Born: Bernard Colin Greenly; January 21, 1928; London, England
- Died: 2014, age 86; Campbell Hall, New York
- Education: Harvard College (B.A.); Columbia University School of the Arts; American University Graduate School of Fine Arts
- Known for: Drawing, painting, sculpture
- Notable work: Primary Transitional Symbol; Intangible Sculpture; Wishbone House
- Website: https://colingreenly.com/

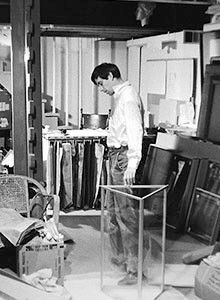
Colin Greenly - 1968

Colin Greenly (1928–2014) was a visual artist active in the United States during the late 20th century and early 21st century.

== Biography ==
(Bernard) Colin Greenly was born in London, England on January 21, 1928. He received his B.A. in 1948 from Harvard College. He studied at Columbia University School of Painting and Sculpture from 1951 to 1953. He also studied at the American University Graduate School of Fine Arts in 1956. Greenly lived and worked mostly in the areas around New York and Washington, DC. Greenly died on October 14, 2014.

=== Early Education and Teaching ===
In 1947, while a student at Harvard University, Greenly's first exhibit was an ink drawing at the Fogg Museum of Art. Upon graduation and after a three-year foray working in the field of advertising, he quit his job to attend Columbia University School of Painting and Sculpture from 1951–53, studying painting and sculpture under Professors Peppino Mangravite, Oronzio Maldarelli, and others. From 1951-53, while in NYC, Greenly worked to establish art programs for employees at Standard Oil, Metropolitan Life Insurance Co., Union Carbide Corp., New York Life Insurance. In 1953, Greenly moved to the Washington DC area to take a part-time teaching position at the Potomac School in McLean, VA. From 1954-1956, Greenly taught at the US. Department of Agriculture Graduate School. In 1955 he was appointed as Art Director at the Madeira School, in Virginia, lasting through 1968. In 1956, Greenly studied at American University, with Robert Gates. From 1972 to 1973, Greenly was Dana Professor of Art at Colgate University and from 1974-1975 he taught art at SUNY in NYC.

== Career ==
=== Early Recognition ===
His first major show was the "Young American Printmakers" exhibition at the Museum of Modern Art in NYC in 1953. He also took part in a three-man show of woodcuts at the Bader Gallery in Washington DC and won a Purchase Prize in 1956 from the Corcoran Gallery of Art. In spring 1956, Greenly's work was selected for an annual group show at the Delaware Art Center.

In 1958 he was invited to become a charter member of the Jefferson Place Gallery in Washington DC with Ken Noland and others, where he had solo shows in 1958, 1960, 1963 and 1965.

=== Drawings, Reliefs, and Sculpture ===
Around 1960, Greenly began to feel painting was too static. While making small models for a sculpture commission with white clay-faced cardboard, he began to discover the subtle color changes that occur when reflected light is caught between two separated planes. This discovery would become the basis for his later work involving universality and actual physical change. That path of inquiry inspired his first series of white, hand embossed, relief drawings.

In a Corcoran Gallery of Art exhibition catalog, James Harithas, then Assistant Director (and organizer of Greenly's 1968 exhibit), explains "[t]he white embossed drawings are a reflection of Greenly's sensitivity to the essential quality of materials. No two-dimensional format could more clearly parallel his sculpture since, in effect, it is the subtle changes of light acting on the raised edges which activate these drawings".

By 1963, Greenly became increasingly disturbed by the multi-directional forces of the polygonal shapes in his relief sculptures. As he was refining the shapes, he intuitively invented a transitional shape derived from expanding the periphery of a square towards a circular form. This shape paralleled and reinforced the time/change aspect of light in the earlier constructions and was incorporated in a new sculpture series shown at the Bertha Schaefer Gallery in 1964, 1966 and 1968. In May 1966, Colta Feller reviewed Greenly's Schaefer Gallery show in Arts Magazine, as follows: "Greenly's works reveal infinite variations in patterns of form, shadow and light [...] Like his sculptures, the artist's geometrical embossed drawings on white paper also rely upon the spectator's response to subtle visual phenomena for their effectiveness."

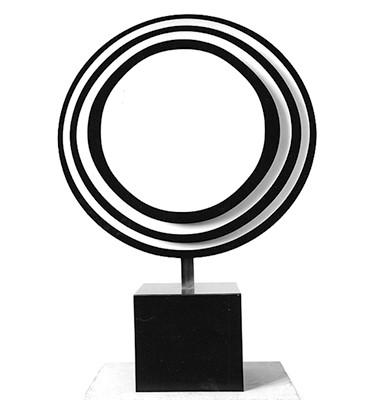
Title: GS 1974

Greenly's Primary Transitional Symbol proved to be an extremely rare visual and mathematical discovery. James Harithas cites a parallel (and completely independent) scientific development occurring in the same period by Danish mathematician Piet Hein in 1965. In the 1970s, Greenly revisited the shape and created a series of paintings. In 1971 he received a commission to paint a large-scale Transitional Symbol directly on the wall of the Everson Museum of Art.

By 1964, Greenly began to look for a way to increase the scale of his acrylic sculptures and eliminate the support bases "to avoid visual interference from the required pedestal" and turned to creating rectangular progressions on a somewhat larger scale. Thickness limitations of the acrylic sheet material in 1967 led him toward the use of painted polystyrene as a lighter weight, scalable solution. Thomas Leavitt, then director of Cornell University's Andrew Dickson White Museum of Art, describes Greenly in 1972 as having "explored interrelationships of space, time and energy in two, three and four dimensions."

To benefit the funding of the Cooper-Hewitt in 1974, Nelson Rockefeller contributed for auction P.M., a black lucite sculpture by Greenly.

=== Selected works ===
==== Wishbone House ====
Wishbone House is a "six-foot high precast concrete A-shaped frame that encouraged both active climbing and quiet play in the shaded bench within." Greenly's design for Wishbone House won the Corcoran Gallery School of Art's National Playground Sculpture Competition in 1967, with subsequent installation in a Washington, D.C. playground. The competition featured submissions from 371 entries, including artists Mark di Suvero and Isamu Noguchi, among others, and was partially funded by the National Endowment for the Arts. This work was featured in the book "Century of the Child: Growing by Design, 1900-2000", published by the Museum of Modern Art, that accompanied an exhibit of the same name. In discussing Wishbone House, the authors state "[Greenly] objected to the placement of the original cast in a wealthy section of Washington, D.C., and Lady Bird Johnson arranged for a second installation in an underserved neighborhood. Others followed, and multiple Wishbone Houses still exist today, including at the Potomac School in McLean, Virginia."

This design was featured in the cover story of Art in America, 55, no. 6 (November–December 1967), in which Greenly states "I considered the problem in this order: playground; sculpture; climb on, climb in, sit on; shade essential; minimum upkeep, maximum shape, minimum cost; reproducibility."

==== Glass Sculpture ====
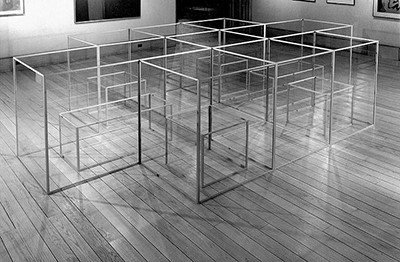
Title: JVD 1967

In 1967, Greenly discovered the reflective qualities of aluminum-edged clear glass. These works are described as "angular constructions of metal-framed plate glass in which reflected images play a salient role" in Encyclopedia of World Art. Shown at the Henri Gallery in 1969, Greenly employed extruded aluminum joined by screws. Greenly wrote, "The glass became not only a volume-space study, but also a study of the question of observed reality versus known reality. The spatial extensions of the pieces are carried both into the piece and beyond the physical limits of the piece through echoes of the aluminum edges."

==== Intangible Sculpture ====
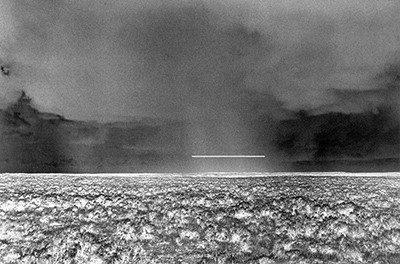
Title: TC 1974

Greenly used photographs to impose abstract 'energy signs' or 'bars' setting up tension over images of landscapes. Focusing on energy exchanges in nature, Greenly began making drawings of huge geometric shapes rising from or suspended over natural landscape. They would lead to the photographic works called "Intangible Sculpture," devoid of tangible materials, but sited in and acting on and with actual landscapes. His "Intangibles" were first exhibited in a solo show in 1971 at the Everson Museum of Art. Subsequent solo exhibits included a 1972 show at the Andrew Dickson White Museum at Cornell University (and traveled under the auspices of the Gallery Association of New York) and The Finch College Museum in NYC in 1974.

Dore Ashton, wrote about Intangible Sculpture in Coloquio Artes after visiting Finch College Museum in 1974. She describes them as 'huge landscape photographs modified in printing, and reading more like paintings than like sculptures. Yet Greenly's wizardry did transform his objects into images that are not easily categorized." Ashton quotes Greenly in Coloquio Artes, stating "[a]ll existence is a manifestation of energy which is the basis of art. In this work all the evidence presented and implied (without time limit) is the sculpture. Intangible sculpture neither inserts an object into a site, be it landscape or other physical source, nor is it represented by physical action taken on the site. Instead, the site becomes a part of the total sculpture and the sculpture's energy manifestation."

==== Hulse Barn ====
In 1978, Greenly, together with his second wife, Laurie Greenly, (m. 1976,) purchased the dilapidated but still structurally intact 1878 Hulse family dairy barn in Campbell Hall, New York, intent upon renovating its 6,000-square foot interior into both a living space and studios by leveraging their respective experience and shared vision as artists. Both were directly engaged in the demolition, renovation, and reconstruction of the barn itself and three supporting structures over the course of ten years, as well as the construction of additional studio space, surrounding gardens, and works documenting their progress.

Though the scale of the undertaking was formidable, Greenly stated, "We loved the smartness of the Hulse farmers, the site, and the way the sunlight streamed through the old 10-inch square hand-hewn posts and beams, all assembled in the plan of a European Basilica.” “The barn is a matter of spirit” stated Greenly. Inspired by the idea of living in an environmental work of art helped guide the results of their combined efforts for the remainder of his life. Said Greenly, “basically, the barn makes people happy.”

== Exhibitions ==
=== Solo exhibitions ===
- 1965, 1963, 1960, 1958 Jefferson Place Gallery, Washington DC
- 1968,1966,1964, Bertha Schaefer Gallery, NYC
- 1968, Corcoran Gallery of Art, Washington DC
- 1968,1970, Royal Marks Gallery, NYC
- 1971, Everson Museum of Art, Syracuse, NY
- 1972, Andrew Dickson White Museum, Cornell University, NY, "Intangible Sculpture"
- 1973, Picker Gallery, Colgate University, NY
- 1974, Finch College Museum, NYC
- 1975, Fosdick Nelson Gallery, SUNY, Alfred, NY
- 1975, Creative Arts Workshop, New Haven, CT
- 2014, Colin Greenly, 60 Years of Seeing, Mindy Ross Gallery, SUNY, Newburgh, NY

=== Group exhibitions ===
- 1953, Museum of Modern Art, NYC, "Young American Printmakers
- 1965, Eleanor Rigelhaupt Gallery, Boston MA, "Black and White"
- 1965, Institute of Contemporary Arts, Washington DC, "Art in Washington"
- 1965, DeCordova Museum, Lincoln, MA, "White on White"
- 1965, Daniels Gallery, NYC, "Plastics"
- 1966, Westmoreland County Museum, Pennsylvania, "Current Trends in American Art"
- 1967, Des Moines Art Center, Des Moines, IA, "Selected Artists"
- 1968, Washington Gallery of Modern Art, Washington DC, "Art in Washington"
- 1968, Smithsonian American Art Museum, Washington DC
- 1968, Flint Institute of Art, MI, "Made of Plastic"
- 1968, Witte Memorial Museum, San Antonio, TX, "Award-Winning Artists, Southeast and Southwest"
- 1969, Grand Rapids Art Museum, Grand Rapids, MI, "American Sculpture of the Sixties"
- 1970, Baltimore Museum of Art, MD, "Washington, Twenty Years"
- 1971, Jacksonville Art Museum, FL, "Transparent and Translucent Art"
- 1972, New York State Museum, "Enviro-Vision"
- 1972, Emmerich Gallery, NYC
- 1973, Museum of Modern Art, NYC
- 1973, Decorative Arts Center, NYC, "Painting in America: Yesterday and Tomorrow"
- 1973, New York Cultural Center, NYC, "Megalopolis"
- 1974, Krannert Art Museum, Champaign, IL, "Contemporary American Painting and Sculpture"
- 1975, John Weber Gallery, NYC
- 1976, 112 Green Street, NYC
- 1978, Whitney Museum of American Art, NYC
- 1981, NY State Museum, Albany, NY
- 2012, Museum of Modern Art, NYC "Century of the Child: Growing by Design, 1900-2000" Wishbone House
- 2013, Ventana 244 Gallery, NYC
- 2017, American University Museum, Washington D.C. "Making a Scene: The Jefferson Place Gallery"

== Awards, Prizes and Commissions ==
=== Awards and Prizes ===
- 1967, Winning design for 'Wishbone House', National Playground Sculpture Competition, sponsored by the Corcoran School of Art and Art in America Magazine
- 1967, National Endowment for the Arts and Humanities
- 1972, Visiting Artist, Central Michigan University
- 1972, Artist in Residence, Cazenovia College, Interaction in Arts Festival, Cazenovia, NY
- 1972, Grant for Intangible Sculpture, Creative Artists Public Service Program, NYC
- 1974, Grant from the Committee for the Visual Arts
- 1974, Artist in Residence, Finch College Museum, NYC, Supported by The National Endowment for the Arts and Humanities
- 1977/1978, Fellowship recipient in photography, Creative Arts Public Service Program
- 1993, NY State Decentralization Grant administered by the Arts Council of Orange County
- 2014, State of New York Legislative Resolution Celebrating the 60 Year Career of Colin Greenly

=== Commissions ===
- 1958, Sculpture Relief, Langley School, McLean, Virginia
- 1961, Sculpture Relief, Experiment in International Living, Putney, Vermont
- 1967, "Wishbone House", Playground sculpture, Washington DC, Potomac School, VA, Toronto, Canada, Syracuse, NY, and other sites.
- 1970, "Colorline" event for the Corcoran School of Art in a one-acre city park in Washington DC
- 1971, "Colorline" event in cooperation with the Syracuse University School of Architecture, Community Plaza
- 1971, Wall painting, Primary Transitional Symbol, Everson Museum, Syracuse, NY
- 1972, Eight Color Panels, County Executive Office Building, Onondaga County, NY, executed under the artist's direction, Public Service Teaching Program, Everson Museum, Syracuse, NY
- 1973, Twelve Color Panels, New York State Office Building, Utica, NY, executed under the artist's direction by students at Colgate University, Hamilton, NY
- 1975, Participatory murals: Melrose Mott Haven Senior Center, Bronx, NY and the Rockaway Park Senior Center, Rockaway Pk, NY, Funded by CAPS and the Fund for the City of New York
- 2009, 1964, "Cloudlines" Aluminum sculpture, Jeffery J. Sherman Arts Center, Langley School, McLean, VA
