= William Dutterer =

American painter

William S. Dutterer (1943–2007) was a Washington artist who moved to New York City in 1979 and continued making innovative work until his death in January 2007. Over his 40+ year career, Dutterer developed his own idiosyncratic visual vocabulary that often referenced masks (or, interchangeably, the face), wrapped objects (a mummy or a bound head), the idea of exploring the depths, and the concept of the bystander (a witness so close as to be a possible victim of irrational acts) from his minimalist work of the '60s. His work engages the viewer, encouraging us to consider how our culture and world events impact the way we see ourselves and allow others to see us.

== About ==
Dutterer was born in Hagerstown, Maryland in 1943. His roots, however, were in Pocahontas County, West Virginia, where he spent summers with family. He attended the Maryland Institute College of Art (MICA) in Baltimore, Maryland, for both under-graduate and graduate school. After earning a Master of Fine Arts in 1967, he moved to Washington, D. C. and began teaching painting at the Corcoran School of Art, where he continued to teach until 1986.

He has shown his work in public institutions including The Corcoran Gallery of Art (“34th Biennial Exhibition”), the Kunsthalle Düsseldorf, Germany, The Detroit Institute of Art, The John and Mable Ringling Museum of Art, The Baltimore Museum of Art, Instituto Guatemalteco Americana, the Kennedy Center and One Penn Plaza. He has shown in private galleries including the Pyramid, Osuna, Henri, Jack Rasmussen and Franz Bader Galleries in Washington, D. C., the Susan Caldwell, Frank Marino, and Portico Galleries in New York City as well as galleries in cities throughout the U.S.

After his death in 2007, a retrospective exhibition, True Dutterer: The Work of William S. Dutterer was held at the American University Museum, Washington, D. C. It included several of his later paintings which protested against the ongoing Afghanistan conflict. A further exhibition took place in 2009. A major retrospective of his work, "Humanoid Boogy" was mounted in 2014 at MICA in Baltimore.

Dutterer's work is in the collection of the National Gallery of Art, the Corcoran Gallery of Art, the Baltimore Museum of Art, the American University Museum,, Carnegie Museum of Art the Avampato Discovery Museum (Charleston, West Virginia) and other public and private collections.
