= Alice Denney =

American arts curator (1922–2023)

- Born: November 8, 1922
- Died: November 20, 2023 (aged 101); Washington, D.C., U.S.
- Occupations: Art curator, arts administrator

Alice Denney (November 8, 1922 – November 20, 2023) was an American art curator and arts administrator. Denney has been considered to be an important figure of the Washington, D.C. avant-garde arts and had been the mentor to a number of Washington D.C.'s artists.

== Life and career ==
Alice Denney was born on November 8, 1922. She was the first director of the Jefferson Place Gallery. She was intimately involved in the founding of the Washington Gallery of Modern Art (in 1961), and was the founder of the Washington Project for the Arts (in 1975). Denny served as the assistant director of the Washington Gallery of Modern Art.

Denney helped with the exhibition, The Popular Image (1963), at the Washington Gallery of Modern Art which included Robert Rauschenberg's "Concerto #5", with the Judson Dance Theater. In 1978, she brought the exhibit Punk Art, to the Washington Project of the Arts.

Denney died from a stroke on November 20, 2023, at the age of 101.
