= Valerie Hollister =

American artist

Valerie Dutton Hollister
- Born: Valerie Dutton; December 29, 1939 (age 85); Oakland, California, U.S.
- Other names: Valerie Hollister
- Education: San Francisco Art Institute
- Alma mater: Stanford University
- Spouse: Robinson G. Hollister (m. 1964–)

Valerie Dutton Hollister (née Valerie Dutton; born December 29, 1939) is an American artist, known for her paintings, printmaking, and artist books. She frequently has used computer technology in aspects of her work.

== Biography ==
Valerie Dutton Hollister was born December 29, 1939, in Oakland, California; to parents Betty (née Hines) and Gayle R. Dutton. Hollister was raised in Spokane, Washington and Palo Alto, California; where her parents had been active in the founding of St. Mark's Episcopal Church. She graduated from Lewis and Clark High School in Spokane.

She studied at Stanford University, receiving an A.B. degree in 1961 and a M.A. degree in 1965. In 1964, she married Robinson G. Hollister, a classmate from Stanford University who became an economics professor. She took additional art classes at San Francisco Art Institute, and studied in Paris. In the late 1960s, she was working in Washington, D.C. and was tangential associated with the Washington Color School. Hollister moved to Swarthmore, Pennsylvania in 1971.

In 1968, Hollister was featured in Mademoiselle magazine in the article, "For Art's Sake". In the 1970s, Hollister was working with portraits in a flat, reduced form.

In 1966, she showed her work alongside artist Eric Rudd at Jefferson Place Gallery. In 1967, her work was part of the Corcoran Gallery of Arts' juried group exhibit, the 30th Corcoran Biennial; and she was included in the 1967 Annual Exhibition of Contemporary Painting at the Whitney Museum of American Art.

Hollister has work in public museum collections, including at the Victoria and Albert Museum, and Williams College Museum of Art.
