= V. V. Rankine =

American artist

- Born: Elvine Richard; July 27, 1920; Boston, Massachusetts, U.S.
- Died: June 22, 2004 (aged 83); Olney, Maryland, U.S.
- Other names: Elvine Richard Rankine, Vivian Scott Rankine, E. R. Rankine, Elvine R. King, Elvine King
- Education: Ozenfant School of Fine Arts, Black Mountain College
- Occupation: sculptor
- Spouse(s): John H. Magruder, Paul Scott Rankine, Rufus G. King

V. V. Rankine, also known as Elvine Richard Rankine, Elvine Magruder, and Vivian Scott Rankine (1920–2004), was an American artist and art teacher. She was known for her minimalist sculptures.

== Biography ==
Rankine was born on July 27, 1920, and raised in Boston. Rankine attended the Ozenfant School of Fine Arts, where she studied with Arshile Gorky. This was followed by study at Black Mountain College, where she met and study with Elaine de Kooning, Willem de Kooning, and Josef Albers. She showed her work at Jefferson Place Gallery.

Her work is included in the collection of the Smithsonian American Art Museum, the American University Museum and the Phillips Collection. Her personal papers are included in the Archives of American Art.
