= Hilda Thorpe =

American sculptor and painter

Hilda Shapiro Thorpe (1919–2000) was an American sculptor and painter. Thorpe taught a generation of metro Washington, D.C. artists.

== Life ==
Thorpe was born Hilda Gottlieb on December 1, 1919, in Baltimore. She was a prolific artist who did not start working professionally until she was nearly 40 and had raised three children.

Thorpe made sculpture from materials such as sheet metal, gauze, balsa wood and handmade paper painted with shimmering fields of color. Thorpe carried on the proud tradition of the Washington Color School by painting broad areas flooded in color. Despite her association with the Washington Color School, Thorpe also used watercolor techniques that she learned from her travels which makes her work also part of the Abstract Expressionist movement.

Thorpe was influenced by her peers of the time, including the six artists in The Washington Color School: Morris Louis, Kenneth Noland, Gene Davis, Howard Mehring, Thomas "Tom" Downing, Paul Reed. In July 1997 Thorpe was interviewed for a special Creative Vision documentary by Barbara Januszkiewicz.

Thorpe began teaching at American University in 1971 as part of the sculpture faculty. Thorpe also taught at other schools in the area, including Northern Virginia Community College and Mount Vernon Seminary and Junior College.

== Sources ==
- Elizabeth Tebow Hilda Thorpe: sculpture, paperwork, painting, 1963-1988, Athenaeum, Northern Virginia Fine Arts Association (Alexandria, Va), 1988
- "Hilda Thorpe, in her own words", Washington Review Volume XXVI No.June 1/July 2000 *"Hilda Thorpe, in her own words", Washington Review Volume XXVI No.June 1/July 2000
