= Washington Gallery of Modern Art =

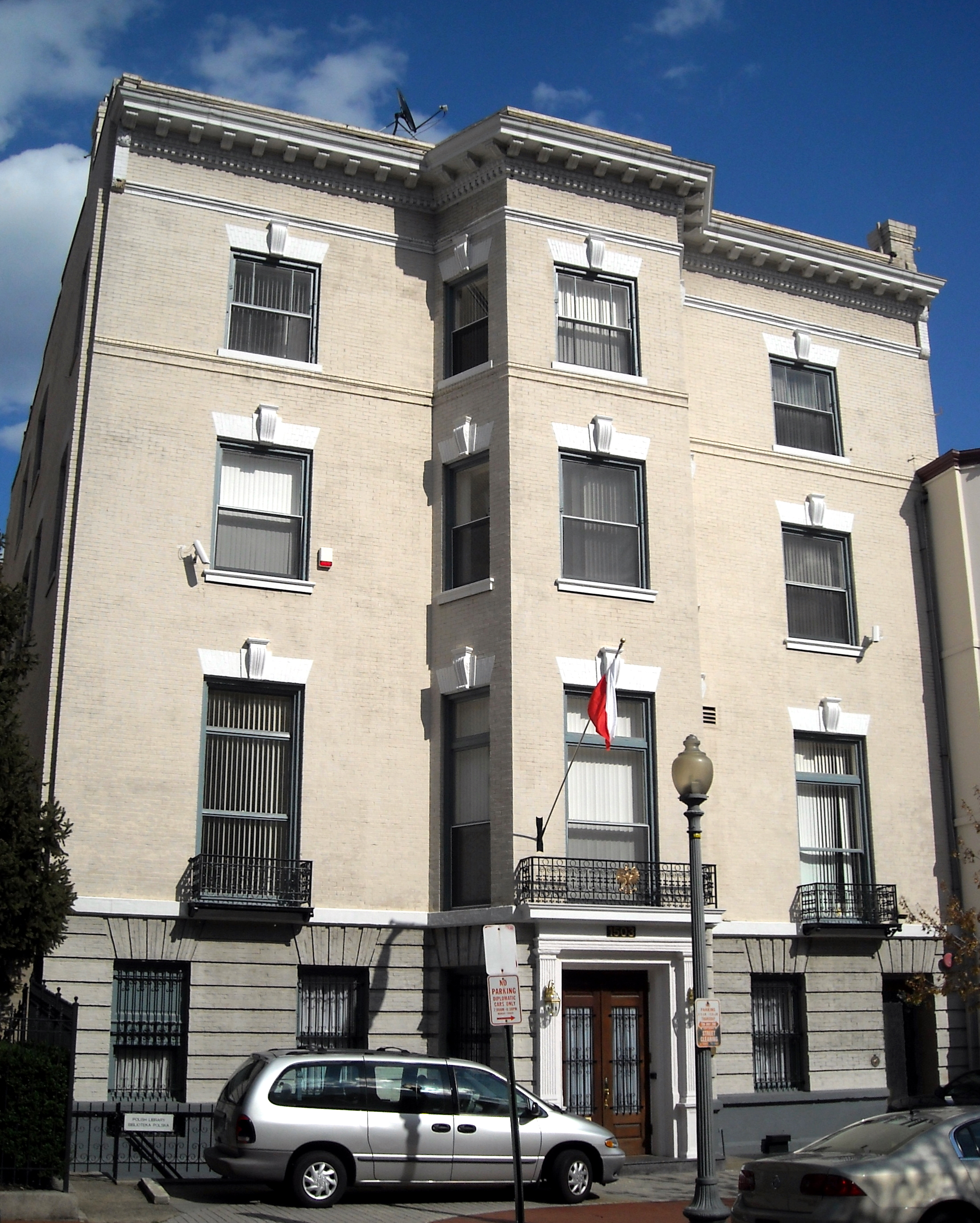
- Former location of the Washington Gallery of Modern Art

- Former location within Washington, D.C. Washington Gallery of Modern Art (the United States)
- Established: 1961
- Dissolved: 1968
- Location: 1503 21st Street, NW, Washington, D.C.
- Coordinates: 38°54′35.85″N 77°02′47.2″W
- Public transit access: Dupont Circle

The Washington Gallery of Modern Art was a short-lived gallery promoting contemporary art near Dupont Circle in Washington, DC, United States, during the 1960s. The gallery remained open for seven years, opening in October 1961 and closing in September 1968. Its collection of 153 works was purchased by the Oklahoma City Museum of Art in 1968 for $110,000. The collection included 20th-century artists, Ellsworth Kelly, Robert Indiana, Grace Hartigan and Marcel Duchamp.

== History ==
The Washington Gallery of Modern Art had a number of exhibitions which traveled nationally and internationally, most notably the historic "Washington Color Painters" show in 1965, which formalized recognition of the Washington Color School of painters. Other important events at the Gallery included the first Franz Kline retrospective in 1962, curated by Alice Denney, and the "Popular Image Show" in 1963, which included artists like Robert Rauschenberg, Jasper Johns, Tom Wesselmann, George Brecht, Claes Oldenburg, Jim Dine and James Rosenquist. The Gallery organized the raucous "Pop Festival" the same year, which was the first occasion on which Rauschenberg performed his now famous "Pelican." John Cage and the Judson Dancers performed, Oldenburg staged a happening called "Stars," and Robert Rosenblum delivered a lecture on Pop Art.

The gallery was founded by Assistant Director, Alice Denney, and Julian Eisenstein. Among its directors were Gerald Nordland (who gave the Washington Color School its name), Charles Millard, Adelyn Breeskin and, for a short stint near the Gallery's end, Walter Hopps. Though a New York Times article cites Eleanor "Lalli" Lloyd as the Gallery's founder, she was instead an important member of the first board.
