= Jennie Lea Knight =

American artist

- Knight at Penland in 1965
- Born: March 31, 1933; Washington, D.C., U.S.
- Died: March 23, 2007 (aged 73); Manassas, Virginia, U.S.
- Known for: Sculpture

Jennie Lea Knight (March 31, 1933 – March 23, 2007) was an American sculptor.

== Early life and education ==
Knight was a native of Washington, D.C., and received her artistic training in that city, beginning her studies with classes in design and music at the King-Smith School of Creative Arts.

She then studied painting with Kenneth Noland at the Institute of Contemporary Arts, from which she graduated in 1951. She then spent four years at American University, during which time her instructors included Robert Franklin Gates and William H. Calfee. In the early 1950s, Knight turned her attention to work in three dimensions, and by 1964 was active exclusively as a sculptor. In the summer of that year she spent time working in the bronze foundry at the Penland School of Crafts, casting and finishing her own work using the lost-wax method; she returned in 1965. She spent time as well at Milan's Fonderia Artistica Battaglia learning more about casting techniques.

== Career and late life ==
During her career, Knight taught at the American University, George Mason University, the Corcoran School of Art, and the Art League School, and from 1954 until 1974 worked as a photographer for the National Institutes of Health.

In 1956, she was one of the founders of the Studio Gallery in Alexandria, Virginia, one of the first such galleries in northern Virginia. In 1972 she served as chief of installation of the American Pavilion at the Venice Biennale; the following year a studio fire destroyed much of her work. Knight and her partner, Marcia Newell, lived for many years on a working farm in Haymarket, Virginia, where Knight worked as a certified wildlife rehabilitator in addition to creating art.

Left nearly immobile by bouts of fibromyalgia and cancer, she turned to working in miniature forms before dying of cancer at Prince William Hospital in Manassas. She is buried in the Little Georgetown Cemetery in Broad Run.

Stylistically, Knight has been described as an "eccentric abstract sculptor" who drew much of her inspiration from natural forms. Four of her works, including two impressions of the 1974 lithograph Emily Sleeping, are currently owned by the Smithsonian American Art Museum. Copies of the same lithograph are owned by the National Gallery of Art and the Phillips Collection; the latter institution also owns the 1950 oil-on-hardboard painting Bluescape. Knight was also represented in the collection of the Corcoran Gallery of Art until the institution's demise; two of her sculptures from the collection were then transferred to the National Museum of Women in the Arts, while a lithograph and a drawing were accessioned by the Katzen Arts Center at American University. The Art League presents the Jennie Lea Knight Creativity Award in her memory.
