= Robert Franklin Gates =

American painter (1906–1982)

- Born: October 6, 1906; Detroit, Michigan, U.S.
- Died: March 11, 1982 (aged 75); Alexandria, Virginia, U.S.
- Other name: Robert F. Gates
- Education: Detroit School of Arts and Crafts, Art Students League of New York, Phillips Gallery Art School
- Occupations: muralist, painter, printmaker, professor
- Spouse(s): Margaret Casey Gates (m. 1933–c.1950s; divorce), Sarita Weekes Gates (m. 1967–1982; death)

Robert Franklin Gates (1906–1982) was an American muralist, painter, printmaker, and art professor. He was a professor at American University, between 1946 until 1975. In the 1930s, Gates was one of hundreds of artists who benefitted from the Treasury Department Section of Fine Arts's distribution of approximately 14,000 art and mural contracts.

== Early life and education ==
Robert Gates was born on October 6, 1906, in Detroit, Michigan. He first studied art at the Detroit School of Arts and Crafts. He attended the Art Students League of New York in New York City, from 1929 to 1930.

From 1930 to 1932, he studied under C. Law Watkins at the Phillips Gallery Art School in Washington, D.C.

== Career ==
Between 1934 and 1938, he worked as an instructor at the Studio House in Washington, D.C.

During this period, he won multiple commissions from the U.S. Treasury Department Section of Fine Arts, as part of President Franklin Roosevelt's New Deal program. In 1934, he created a series of watercolors for Charles Gardens, South Carolina. He installed his first post office mural, entitled Montgomery County Farm Women's Market in Bethesda, Maryland, in 1939. He created Old Time Camp Meeting for the Lewisburg, West Virginia, and Buckwheat Harvest for the Oakland, Maryland, post offices in 1940 and 1942, respectively.

While completing his Treasury Department commissions between 1937 and 1942, Gates also served as an instructor at the University of Florida, Hood College in Frederick, Maryland; the Washington County Museum of Art in Hagerstown, Maryland; and the Phillips Gallery Art School in Washington, D.C., where his wife Margaret worked as a secretary.

Gates served in World War II as a civilian technician with the U.S. Navy. He made models and designed camouflage patterns.

After the war, he studied under William Howard Calfee at American University. He joined the faculty there in 1946, and retired in 1975. From 1953 to 1957, he served as the chairman of American University's art department.

Gates worked as the Artist-in-Residence at the United States Embassy in Baghdad, Iraq, from 1966 to 1967.

His work is held in permanent collections at the Smithsonian American Art Museum, American University, the Baltimore Museum of Art, the Corcoran Gallery of Art, and the Phillips Collection. The Smithsonian Archives of American Art and the Frick Art Reference Library also hold collections of his work and personal papers.

== Personal life ==
Robert Gates met his first wife, Margaret Casey, at the Phillips Gallery Art School in Washington, D.C. They were married on January 7, 1933, and divorced in the mid-1950s. Gates married his second wife, Sarita Weekes, in Baghdad in 1967.

He died on March 11, 1982, of arteriosclerosis at Oak Meadows nursing home in Alexandria, Virginia.
