= Draped painting =

Artistic technique

Draped paintings are paintings on unstretched canvas or fabric that are hung, tied, or draped from individual points and allowed to bunch or fold. The style was developed in the late 1960s and 1970s by several groups of artists, and popularized most notably by American artist Sam Gilliam, who created a large number of Drape paintings throughout his career, often as large-format installation pieces designed to fill an entire wall or space.

Seahorses, a draped painting by Sam Gilliam, installed on the outside of the Philadelphia Museum of Art in 1975

== Historical origins ==
In the late 1960s, the idea of shaped canvases in the context of contemporary art was expanding to include three-dimensional shapes and sculptural, painted reliefs. Several groups of artists working in different regions began extending this concept by experimenting with paintings without stretcher bars or made with everyday fabrics and objects, or presenting the stretcher bars themselves as art.

Working in New York, Richard Tuttle began to pin colored and painted irregular geometric fabric shapes to the wall in 1967. Artists associated with the Supports/Surfaces movement in France, beginning the same year, started hanging large painted fabrics on the wall, often combining multiple pieces of fabric together. Sam Gilliam in Washington, D.C., Claude Viallat in France, and Nina Yankowitz in New York – among possibly others – concurrently and without knowledge of each other began knotting and folding their wet canvases or painted fabrics to achieve the patterns they wanted in the compositions before draping them in different combinations on the wall, starting in 1967 and 1968. Gilliam in particular rapidly increased the size of his canvases and began to suspend his works out beyond the gallery wall, sometimes tying them from points in the ceiling or middle of the room, bringing the paintings into conversation with the architectural features of the gallery space.

Sculptors and mixed media artists including Lynda Benglis, Eva Hesse, and Robert Morris, all working around the same time in the late 1960s and early 1970s, were also beginning to use suspended and wall-based fabrics and sculptural elements, draped or shaped in similar ways. Some artists in this wave of exploration of material and form would eventually be broadly categorized by several critics and historians as early postminimalist artists, for their use of everyday materials and objects to create a new kind of "anti-formalist" art that rejected key aesthetic elements of minimalism and medium specificity, both of which were leading formalist strains of art production and criticism in the 1960s. Critic Robert Pincus-Witten, a leading proponent of postminimalist art, defined this as art whose content or form is an exploration of what art can or should be, but as defined through an artist or critic's own personal "imperfect world of experience;" this eventually also led to and encompassed the development of conceptual art.

== Origin of the term ==
In 1968 and 1969 Yankowitz had two exhibitions of draped paintings in New York, using the terms "Draped Paintings" and "Pleated Paintings" as the titles of the shows.

Critics first described Gilliam's draped canvas paintings in 1969 variously as "hanging canvas," "soft" paintings, and, once they became more elaborate, "situations;" Gilliam himself originally used the terms "suspended paintings" and "sculptural paintings" to describe the style. Several critics and art historians – and Gilliam – came to call his works in this style his Drapes or "Drape paintings," both for the method of draping and for their resemblance to heavy Baroque-style fabric window drapery, which he cited as an inspiration in 1970.

== Gilliam's Drape paintings ==
Gilliam's Drape paintings first began as an extension of an earlier series of abstract paintings displayed on beveled stretcher bars, which extended the paintings several inches off the wall like sculptured reliefs. To create these paintings he would pour and soak thinned acrylic paint onto canvases laid directly on the floor, before folding them to create clear lines and pools of color in the composition. Starting in late 1967, Gilliam experimented with draping these canvases once they had dried; he left them crumpled and folded to dry, and then used rope, leather, wire, and other materials to suspend, drape, or knot the paintings from walls and ceilings of his workshop. He tested a range of fabrics for these paintings, including linens, silks, and cotton materials.

The precise genesis of Gilliam's Drape paintings is unclear, as he offered multiple explanations throughout his life. Among the most-cited origin stories is that he was inspired by laundry hanging on clotheslines in his neighborhood in such volumes that the clotheslines had to be propped up to support the weight, an explanation he told ARTnews in 1973. Alternately, he told art historian Jonathan P. Binstock in 1994 that he had visited artist Kenneth Noland in Vermont in 1967 and engaged in a significant discussion about the sculpture of Anthony Caro and David Smith: "What really shocked me is that I had never thought about sculpture at all ... And that's what led to the draped paintings; I mean, trying to produce a work that was about both painting and sculpture." Further still, he told filmmaker Rohini Tallala in 2004 that the Drape paintings had been inspired by his father's work as a hobbyist carpenter making sets for plays at their church in Louisville. In a 2011 interview with Kojo Nnamdi on WAMU, he directly refuted the widely cited origin story about laundry on clotheslines, telling Nnamdi that the Drapes were "a business decision," made because he "had to do something different," and that they had been inspired by Washington's Rock Creek Park.

Gilliam's first public exhibition of these paintings in late 1968 included works like Swing. The following year, an exhibition at Washington's Corcoran Gallery of Art, Gilliam/Krebs/McGowin (with Rockne Krebs and Ed McGowin), presented ten of Gilliam's largest and most immersive Drape works up to that point. These included Baroque Cascade, a 150 ft long canvas suspended from the rafters in the Corcoran's two-story atrium gallery; and Carousel Form II, Carousel Form III, Horizontal Extension, and Light Depth, each 75 ft long and draped from the walls throughout the smaller side galleries. Baroque Cascade in particular received acclaim for combining painting and architecture to explore space, color, and shape.

In the 1970s, he created larger and more immersive Drapes including metal, rocks, wooden beams, ladders, and sawhorses in the environment, sometimes draping or piling canvases over the objects instead of suspending them from above. One of his largest and most well-known works, Seahorses, was a draped installation created for the Philadelphia Museum of Art as part of a city-wide festival in 1975. Inspired by the large bronze rings that decorate the top of the museum's building, which Gilliam said had made him imagine Neptune using them to tie seahorses to his temple, the work consisted of six monumental painted canvases, two measuring 40 x 95 ft and four measuring 30 x 60 ft, hung from their respective top corners on the outside walls of the museum, attached via the rings and drooping down in upside-down arches of folds. In 1977 he reinstalled the work with five canvases instead of six, on the outside of the Brooklyn Museum.

Gilliam integrated the natural environment into a Drape work completed in 1977 for an artist residency at the Artpark State Park in upstate New York, where he was assisted in part by his daughter Melissa. His installation Custom Road Slide, his first formal engagement with land art, was created with hundreds of yards of tobacco muslin and polypropylene stained with biodegradable pigment that he installed across the landscape of the park, overlooking the Niagara Gorge. He ran the canvases up and down hills and draped them across different parts of the park in over a dozen individual installations over the course of the summer residency, accompanied by piles of shale, pigmented sawhorses and wood boards, and detritus gathered from the park; Gilliam described the pieces as "sculptural fabric placements." The form of the installation took shape after Gilliam and his assistants draped a length of painted muslin over a cliff before a storm blew it down the slope; they then reclaimed the partly destroyed muslin, draping and sculpting it with objects in various areas of the park, often running alongside the park's road.

Also in 1977, as one of the first artists-in-residence at the newly established Fabric Workshop and Museum, he created Philadelphia Soft, six draped linen and canvas works that he had covered with printed designs instead of paint, repeated by hand in layered configurations using the workshop's industrial screenprinter. Critic Grace Glueck called this piece "as subtle and beautiful as his abstract paintings."

Gilliam installed a monumental Drape painting at the Whitney Museum's Phillip Morris branch gallery in 1993. The work – Golden Element Inside Gold – comprised a massive canvas draped within several large metal rings hanging from the ceiling in the gallery's large atrium.

In 1997 he created an installation at the Kunstmuseum Kloster Unser Lieben Frauen in Magdeburg, Germany, inside the museum's historic chapel. Combining his earlier immersive Drape installations with his printmaking and sewing techniques, he used woodcut engravings to stamp an over 3000 ft length of polypropylene before staining, painting, and then cutting it into long, thin pieces. He sewed the strips onto a support structure in the chapel's vaulted ceiling, creating dozens of parabola forms that hung nearly to the floor in the nave of the chapel, and installed variously sized mirrors at different angles in the building's archways to reflect the painted forms. He first presented a version of this installation, created in collaboration with printmaker William Weege, in 1991 at the Walker Hill Art Center in Seoul.

In 1998 at Washington's Kreeger Museum he placed several small Drape paintings in the museum's outdoor pool. The director of the museum later recalled that, after she had given Gilliam somewhat negative feedback on a work he was preparing inside a gallery, he decided to throw the canvases in the pool as a different artistic direction, building custom floatation devices to keep them situated through the exhibition.

Gilliam was commissioned by the Art in Embassies Program in 2006 to create a permanent work for the American Embassy in Bamako, Mali. His Drape work Mali consists of several bright stained canvases draped like hoods over suspension wires in the embassy's atrium, which writer Jackson Brown has compared to Gilliam's earlier Cowl paintings.

In conjunction with The Phillips Collection's 90th anniversary in 2011, Gilliam created a site-specific Drape work commissioned for the large well next to the museum's interior elliptical spiral staircase, nearly 45 years after his debut solo museum show, at The Phillips in 1967. Titled Flour Mill and directly inspired by the American abstract artist Arthur Dove's painting Flour Mill II from 1938, which is owned by the museum, Gilliam's installation comprised a series of narrow, 8–10 ft long nylon panels, each folded in half over a set of wires in multiple rows spanning the width of the well next to the stairs, and hanging down from the second floor to the first. After staining and splashing the nylon with acrylic, Gilliam cut a series of rectangular openings into each panel, creating visual windows or frames that revealed the back half of the panel when folded over the wire. Later that year he staged a solo exhibition at the American University Museum, installing a series of draped canvases from the ceilings in the museum's double-height rotunda gallery, each by a single point in the canvas to form tree-like shapes that either hovered just above the floor or cascaded onto it, creating what the curator described as "a forest of art." He also showed several smaller Drape constructions which he created by stitching stained and painted nylon into drooping box-like forms that he hung on the wall.

In 2017 he installed Yves Klein Blue outside the main building for the show Vive Arte Viva at the 57th Venice Biennale, similar to the presentation of the earlier Seahorses.
