= Robert A. Brown =

American academic

10th President of Boston University
- In office 2005 – July 31, 2023
- Preceded by: Aram V. Chobanian
- Succeeded by: Kenneth W. Freeman (interim); Melissa L. Gilliam

Provost of the Massachusetts Institute of Technology
- In office 1998–2005
- Preceded by: Joel Moses
- Succeeded by: L. Rafael Reif

Personal details
- Born: July 22, 1951 (age 74)
- Spouse: Beverly Brown
- Education: University of Texas at Austin (BS, MA); University of Minnesota (PhD)
- Scientific career
- Fields: Chemical engineering
- Institutions: Massachusetts Institute of Technology; Boston University
- Thesis: The shape and stability of three-dimensional interfaces (1979)
- Doctoral advisor: L. E. Scriven

Robert Arthur Brown (born July 22, 1951) is an American chemical engineer and university administrator. He was the 10th president of Boston University and a former provost of Massachusetts Institute of Technology (MIT). In 1991, Brown was elected as a member into the National Academy of Engineering for the application of computing techniques to fundamental and practical problems in fluid mechanics, rheology, and crystal growth.

== Biography ==
Brown is a chemical engineer by training. A native of San Antonio, Texas, he received his B.S. and M.A. in chemical engineering from the University of Texas at Austin, and his Ph.D., also in chemical engineering, from the University of Minnesota in 1979.

In 1979, Brown joined the faculty of MIT as an assistant professor, where he worked for 25 years before moving across the Charles River to become the president of Boston University. During his tenure at MIT, he served as the Warren K. Lewis Professor of Chemical Engineering, co-director of the MIT Supercomputer Facility, head of the department of chemical engineering, and dean of engineering. In 1998, he became the provost of MIT.

Brown was selected as the 10th president of Boston University in May 2005. He was inaugurated in September 2005, succeeding Aram V. Chobanian, who served from October 2003 until June 2005.

In January 2006, Brown became an honorary citizen of Singapore for his key role in bringing world-class graduate research and educational programs to Singapore through the creation of collaborations between the National University of Singapore, the Nanyang Technological University and the Massachusetts Institute of Technology. In February 2006, President George W. Bush appointed Brown to the President’s Council of Advisors on Science and Technology (PCAST), a panel established to maintain a steady stream of expert advice from the private sector and the academic community on a wide range of scientific and technical matters. Brown is a member of the National Academy of Sciences, the National Academy of Engineering, and the American Academy of Arts and Sciences, and a director of E. I. du Pont de Nemours and Company.

Brown served as a member of the board of the Aalto University from 2008-2010. He was honored with the National Academy of Engineering Simon Ramo Founders Award in 2014 for his contributions to engineering and society.

== Presidency of Boston University ==
Under Brown's presidency, Boston University created the Arvind and Chandan Nandlal Kilachand Honors College, a residential honors college for Boston University undergraduates, which was dedicated in 2011, and the Frederick S. Pardee School of Global Studies, established in 2014, which combines traditional international relations with faculty in the humanities and social sciences interested in global students, as well as the traditional area studies centers.

In 2013, the university created the Initiative on Cities, with the former Mayor of Boston Thomas Menino as a founding co-director. The IOC focuses on engaging urban leaders, academics, and policy makers to help plan for the development of essential services and sustainable infrastructure necessary for cities to flourish. Following Mayor Menino's death in fall 2014, his legacy was continued through the Annual Menino Survey of Mayors.

The progress of Boston University has been acknowledged in many ways, including improved academic rankings and by bond rating improvements. Most notably, in 2012, Boston University was admitted to the Association of American Universities (AAU), the group of premier public and private research universities in the United States and Canada.

New facilities built during Brown's presidency include:

- Yawkey Center for Student Services, which combines undergraduate student services with a modern dining hall
- New Balance Field, the second athletic field for the university, built above a parking structure
- 33 Agganis Way, a two-building 960-bed undergraduate residence
- Medical Student Residence on the Medical Campus
- Sumner Redstone Building for the School of Law (accompanied by complete renovation of the Law Tower, completed in 2015)
- The Engineering Product Innovation Center, a 15,000-square-foot space for engineering product development and collaboration used by students in the College of Engineering
- The Alan and Sherry Leventhal Center, the visitor center for the Charles River Campus, which houses the undergraduate admissions reception center
- The National Emerging Infectious Diseases Laboratory (NEIDL), the somewhat controversial laboratory supported by the NIH, which houses a Biosafety Containment 4 (BSL-4) laboratory, the highest containment level for performing research on the most lethal infectious diseases.
- The Kilachand Center for Integrated Life Sciences & Engineering, a 180,000-square-foot research facility

Many of these initiatives have been driven by the university's first-ever comprehensive fundraising campaign, which was launched in 2012 with the goal of raising $1 billion by the end of 2017. The goal of the campaign was raised to $1.5 billion in September 2015.

Brown retired as President of Boston University on July 31, 2023.

== Personal ==
Brown lives in Brookline with his wife, Beverly Brown, who works at Boston University as director of development, industry at the School of Public Health at Boston University. They have two grown sons.

== Awards and honors ==
- 4x Outstanding Faculty Award, department of chemical engineering, M.I.T. (1980, 1983, 1985, 1988)
- The Camille and Henry Dreyfus Foundation Teacher-Scholar Award (1983)
- Young Author Award, American Association of Crystal Growth (1984)
- Allan P. Colburn Award, American Institute of Chemical Engineers (1986)
- Elected to the National Academy of Engineering (1991)
- Professional Progress Award, American Institute of Chemical Engineers (1996)
- Professional Progress Lecture, American Institute of Chemical Engineers (1997)
- Elected to the National Academy of Sciences (2001)
- Named Honorary Citizen of the Republic of Singapore (2006)
- Named one of the 100 Most Influential Chemical Engineers of the Modern Era by the American Institute of Chemical Engineers (2008)
- Simon Ramo Founders Award, National Academy of Engineering (2014)
- Chief Executive Leadership Award, District One of Council for Advancement and Support of Education (CASE) (2015)
