= Kenneth W. Freeman =

American business executive and academic dean

President of Boston University
- Interim
- In office August 1, 2023 – June 30, 2024
- Preceded by: Robert A. Brown
- Succeeded by: Melissa L. Gilliam

Personal details
- Education: Bucknell University (BA); Harvard Business School (MBA)

Kenneth W. Freeman is an American former business executive and academic dean. He was previously the CEO of Quest Diagnostics and Masonite International. From August 2023 to July 2024, he served as the interim president of Boston University.

== Career ==
=== Business ===
A graduate of Bucknell University and the Harvard Business School, Freeman began his career with Corning Glass Works in 1972. He held a number of accounting, control, and finance positions with the company. He worked his way up to the position of corporate controller and in 1985, was given the additional title of vice president. Two years later he was appointed senior vice president. In 1990 he was appointed chief executive officer of Corning Asahi Video. In 1993 he was named Corning's diversity officer in charge of minority hiring and other personnel issues.

In 1995, Freeman was named president and chief executive officer of Corning Clinical Labs. On December 31, 1996, Corning Clinical Labs was spun-off into an independent company known as Quest Diagnostics. He remained with the company until 2004, when he was succeeded by Surya Mohapatra.

In 2005, he joined Kohlberg Kravis Roberts as a managing director. He also served on the firm's portfolio management committee, which oversees the company's holdings. He was appointed chairman and CEO of Masonite International after the company was acquired by KKR. In 2006 he became executive chairman of Accellent Inc.

=== Academia ===
In 2010, Freeman became the Allen Questrom professor and dean of Boston University's School of Management. He later ended his service as dean, but remained with BU as dean emeritus and professor of the practice at the Questrom School of Business.

From April 2020 to August 2021, Freeman served as Boston University's interim vice president for human resources, and from 2021 to 2022 he was the interim vice president and associate provost for online programs. On August 1, 2023, he became the interim president of Boston University, following the retirement of president Robert Brown. Later that year, it was announced that Melissa Gilliam would succeed him as president in July 2024.

Freeman was a member of the Bucknell University board of trustees for 18 years and served as chair from 2009 to 2018. In 2018, he donated $25 million to Bucknell's new College of Management, which was renamed the Kenneth W. Freeman College of Management. It was the first time in the university's history that a college was named after a person.
