= Dorothy Butler Gilliam =

American journalist (born 1936)

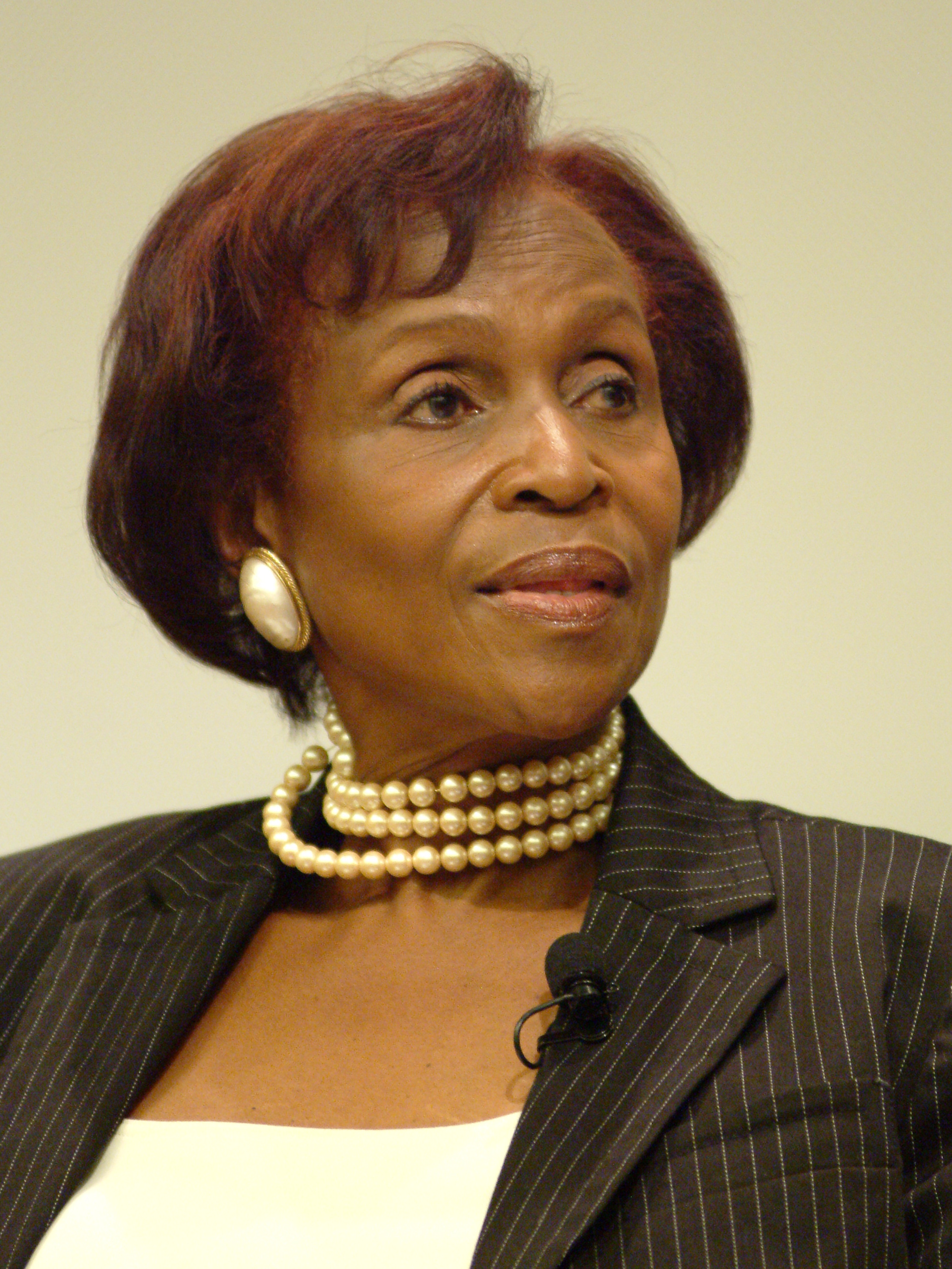
- Gilliam in 2007
- Born: Dorothy Pearl Butler; November 24, 1936 (age 89); Memphis, Tennessee, U.S.
- Education: Lincoln University (BA); Columbia University (MA)
- Occupation: Journalist
- Employers: The Washington Post; Jet; Tri-State Defender
- Spouse: Sam Gilliam (divorced)
- Children: 3, including Melissa, Leah

Dorothy Pearl Butler Gilliam (born November 24, 1936) is an American journalist who in 1961 was the first African-American female reporter at The Washington Post.

== Biography ==
Gilliam was born in Memphis, Tennessee, on November 24, 1936. She was the eighth child of Adee Conklin Butler and Jessie Mae Norment Butler.

When Gilliam was in her first year at Ursuline College (later merged with Bellarmine University) she worked as a secretary for the weekly Louisville Defender, an African-American newspaper, and at 17 years old was unexpectedly made its society reporter. She was struck by how practicing journalism could expose her to "new worlds" different from her own. She transferred to a historically black college with a journalism program, graduating cum laude from Lincoln University in Jefferson City, Missouri, with a bachelor's degree in journalism.

In 1957, she became a reporter for the Memphis Tri-State Defender, part of the Chicago Defender chain. There, she was hired by and worked for editor L. Alex Wilson. When she watched on television at the Defender's offices, Wilson, who had gone to report the story, being beaten by a white mob during the 1957 Little Rock Nine school desegregation crises, she was shaken into action. Despite Wilson's prior warning that Little Rock was no place for "a girl" reporter, she insisted on going to cover the story. While there, she met an editor from Jet and soon became a reporter for the Johnson Publishing Company's news magazine. She continued working at Jet and its sister publication, Ebony, but realized to get a reporter's job at a city daily newspaper, she needed even more formal credentials. She earned her master's degree at the Columbia University Graduate School of Journalism and was hired by The Washington Post when she was 24, the first African-American woman to be hired as a reporter by the paper.

Gilliam started her career at The Washington Post in October 1961 as a reporter on the City Desk. In 1979, she began writing a popular column for the Post, covering education, politics, and race; the column ran regularly in the Metro section for 19 years.

in 1976, Butler wrote a biography of the iconoclastic athlete, artist and political activist called "Paul Robeson, All American."

In addition to her career at The Washington Post, she has been an activist dedicated to public service, from her days helping to organize protests against the New York Daily News after it fired two-thirds of its African-American staff, to her tenure as president of the National Association of Black Journalists from 1993 to 1995.

She briefly taught journalism at American University and Howard University.

Gilliam created the Young Journalists Development Program, which was designed to bring more young people into the journalism world, for The Washington Post in 1997. Post journalists work with students at local high schools, and in some cases, the Post prints the high-school newspapers for the schools.

In 2004, while she held the position of J.B. and Maurice C. Shapiro Fellow at The George Washington University School of Media and Public Affairs, Gilliam founded Prime Movers Media, the nation's first journalism mentorship program for underserved students at urban schools. The program sends veteran journalists and university interns to mentor high school student journalists in Washington, D.C. and Philadelphia.

The Washington Press Club awarded Gilliam its Lifetime Achievement Award in 2010. In 2023 Wilberforce University awarded her with an Honorary Doctorate for not only being a trailblazer, but also for her dedication and commitment to the school. In 2022 she established the Adee Butler Writing Center at Wilberforce University to honor her father.

The National Center for Health Research awarded Gilliam its Foremothers Lifetime Achievement Award in 2019.

She is a member of Alpha Kappa Alpha sorority.

Gilliam was married to Sam Gilliam, a well-known abstract artist. They divorced in the 1980s but have three daughters (Stephanie, Melissa, and Leah) and also three grandchildren.

== Bibliography ==
- Gilliam, Dorothy Butler (March 24, 2018). "It's time to recognize the role of the black press in the civil rights movement". NBC.
- Gilliam, Dorothy Butler (2019). Trailblazer: a pioneering journalist's fight to make the media look more like America. Nashville: Center Street. ISBN 9781546076315. OCLC 1081422787.
