= The Miami Line =

Neon lighting in Miami, Florida, United States

Coordinates: 25°46′07″N 80°11′44″W

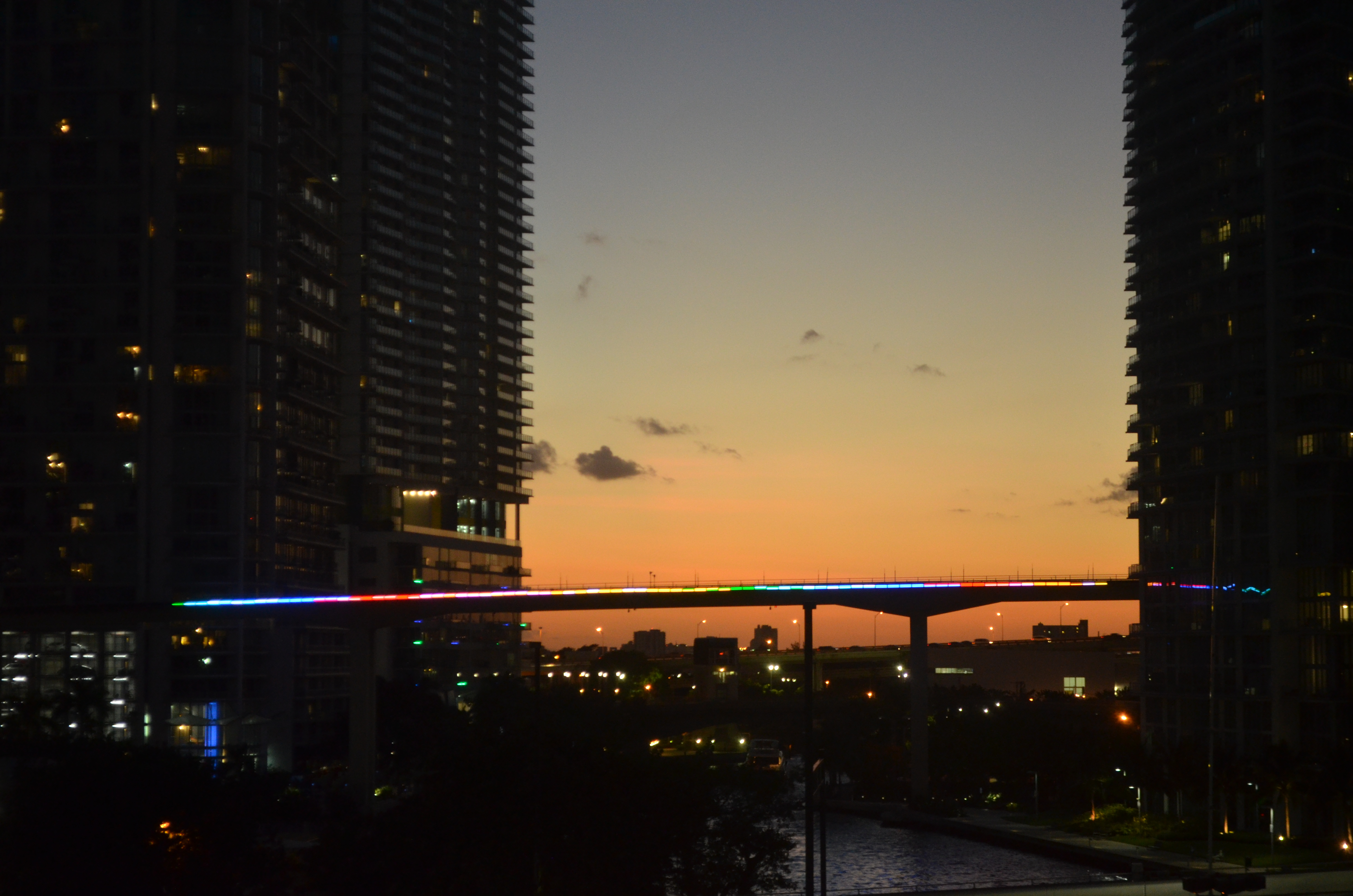
Miami Line, 1984. Metrorail's Miami River Bridge pictured in 2016

The Miami Line is an urban-scale multicolored neon-light installation, designed by Rockne Krebs, in the U.S. city of Miami, Florida, stretching 1,540 feet (470 m) along the Metrorail bridge over the Miami River. When Krebs created the first phase of The Miami Line in 1984, it was 300 feet (91 m) long. Because of to its great popularity, the piece was greatly expanded in 1988 to a total of 1,540 feet (470 m).

Since its creation, The Miami Line has become a signature element of the Downtown Miami skyline and has been featured in countless photographs. Krebs stated that "the Miami Line was conceived as a means to generate visual drama and create an identifying element which is unique to Miami by simply enhancing what is already present". The Miami Line will be restored in phases starting in fall/winter 2014. Miami-Dade County Art in Public Places, a program of the Miami-Dade County Department of Cultural Affairs has developed a plan to recreate the work in LED lighting, which will replicate the visual effect of neon and will make the work resistant to train vibrations.
