= Sculpture with a D =

Sculpture with a "D"
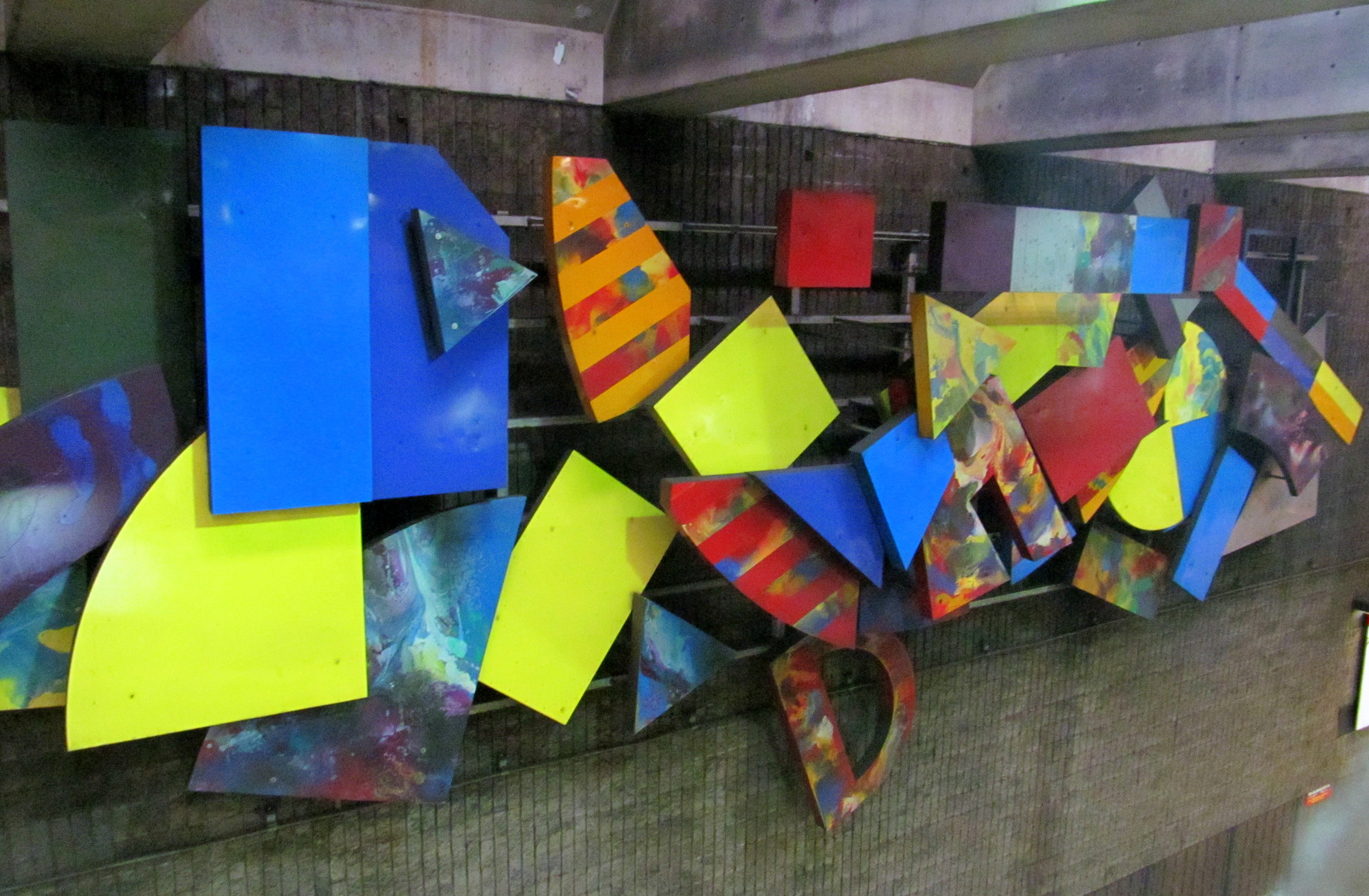
- Artist: Sam Gilliam
- Year: 1983
- Dimensions: (15 ft. 7 in. ft × 44 ft. 10 in ft)
- Location: Davis station; Somerville, Massachusetts; 42.397°N 71.123°W
- Owner: Massachusetts Bay Transportation Authority

Sculpture with a "D" is an abstract sculpture by Sam Gilliam, designed in 1980 and installed in 1983. It is located at Davis (MBTA station), Somerville, Massachusetts. Painted aluminum shapes connect to one another and to a supporting grid, forming a composite 44 feet long that hangs above the platform. These were described by a critic as "a burst of painted abstract shapes", and include elements evoking letters which spell out the name of the station.

The work was commissioned as one of the first twenty works of the Arts on the Line program.
