= Leah Gilliam =

American filmmaker and media artist (born 1967)

L. Franklin Gilliam
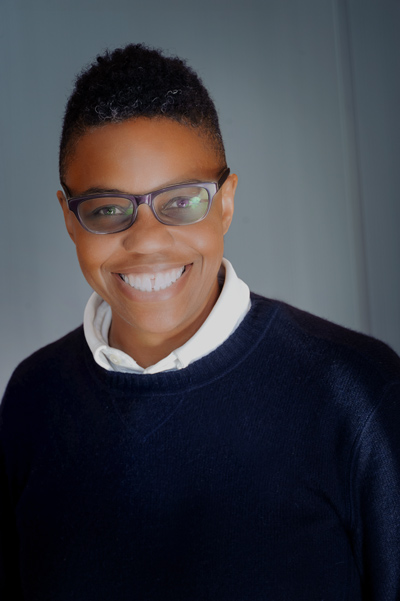
- Born: Leah Catherine Gilliam; 1967 (age 58–59); Washington, D.C., U.S.
- Education: Brown University (BA); New York University (MFA)
- Known for: Participating in first digital media exhibition at Whitney Museum of Art, NY
- Notable work: Apeshit v3, Lesberation, Sapphire and the Slave Girl
- Parents: Sam Gilliam (father); Dorothy Butler Gilliam (mother)
- Relatives: Melissa L. Gilliam (sister)

L. Franklin Gilliam (born 1967) is an American filmmaker and media artist who deals with issues of race, gender, and sexual orientation in their work. Gilliam was the director of projects and community catalyst at gamelab's Institute of Play and a visiting faculty member at the Vermont College of Fine Arts. They are currently vice president of strategy and innovation at Girls Who Code.

== Early life and education ==
Gilliam was born in 1967 in Washington, D.C. The child of Sam Gilliam, an abstract painter, and Dorothy Butler Gilliam, the first black woman reporter for The Washington Post, they grew up with parents who were instrumental in exposing them to cultural production early on in life. They attended Brown University, where they studied Modern Culture and Media. Gilliam graduated with their Bachelor of Arts in 1989. They received their Master of Fine Arts in 1992 from the University of Wisconsin–Milwaukee studying Film and Twentieth Century Studies. They also studied at NYU from 2006 to 2008. Since receiving their master's degree in professional studies in interactive communication from NYU, Gilliam has had a number of academic and design lab appointments.

== Teaching positions ==
Gilliam was already lecturing in the Film Department of the University of Wisconsin–Milwaukee from 1991 to 1992, the year that preceded the completion of their Master of Fine Arts. In 1993, Gilliam took a position as the visiting artist in video at the School of the Art Institute of Chicago. They became an adjunct professor for video there in 1995. Remaining there only a year, Gilliam left to become an assistant professor in the Film and Electronics department at Bard College. In 2002, they received a position as an associate professor and stayed on at Bard College until September 2007. During their time at Bard College, they served as faculty for the Bard M.F.A. Program and director of the Integrated Arts Program, and as chair of Division of the Arts. Despite their absence from Bard's faculty roster, Gilliam still appears on the college's main site in a rotating photo roster of select faculty and students.

== Art ==
"Leah Gilliam's work examines how knowledge is produced and coded and how the conscious reorientation of cultural texts challenges their implications and constructions. In practice, she appropriates texts and uses them as a springboard to interpret larger issues of race, gender and sexual orientation."

Gilliam's work often focuses on technology and obsolescence. This preoccupation surfaces in many of their works. Their contributions to the "BitStreams" digital show at the Whitney Museum of American Art in 2001 were ancient Mac computers displaying fragments of old Super-8 movie trailers. Their 1998 CD-ROM Split: Whiteness, Retrofuturism, Omega Man worked with an 8 mm film trailer for Planet of the Apes and was described as a work that "obsessively looks back at outmoded media technologies." Another piece dealing heavily with the ideas of obsolescence, technology, and the reorientation of cultural texts, Gilliam's work Agenda for a Landscape received a great deal of attention during its stay from July 12 through September 22, 2002 at the New Museum of Contemporary Art. In the year 2000 Gilliam was also a recipient of the Creative Capital Emerging Fields Award.

=== Agenda for a Landscape ===
This solo exhibition was organized by Mark Tribe with Anne Ellegood, the Associate Curator for the New Museum of Contemporary Art."The installation consisted of a pseudo abandoned NASA command center with computer manipulated footage of Mars, obtained by Sojourner Rover[...] in NASA's 1997 Mars Pathfinder mission, combined with Gilliam's own video work and other found imagery." Some of the footage that is interspersed with the original Rover footage is digitally processed footage taken by Gilliam of the Hudson River, forging a connection between two radically different landscapes. Gilliam draws away from the idea of landscape art as the territory of painters and suggests that a new genre of landscape art arises in the response to the "impact of new media on cultural representation." An offshoot DVD was created by Gilliam, entitled Springtime for Mars, providing a story about what happened to the Sojourner rover after it lost contact with us on 24 September 1997. In Springtime for Mars a young female hacker is able to reestablish contact with the rover and the story comes "full circle within the increasing reverberations of diaspora and legacy."

== Filmography ==
- 1992 Now Pretend (10:00, 16 mm Film)
- 1995 Sapphire and the Slave Girl (17:00, Video)
- 1998 Split: Whiteness, Retrofuturism, Omega Man (CD-ROM)
- 1999 Apeshit v3 (computer-based installation)
- 1999 Apeshit (6:30, Video)
- 2001 Playing the Race Card (4:30, Digital Video)
- 2004 Agenda for a Landscape (Interactive Installation)
- 2008 Metrophile (Urban Game, Come Out and Play Festival)
- 2008 Lesberation (Analog Board Game)
