= Melissa L. Gilliam =

American pediatric and adolescent gynecologist

Melissa Gilliam
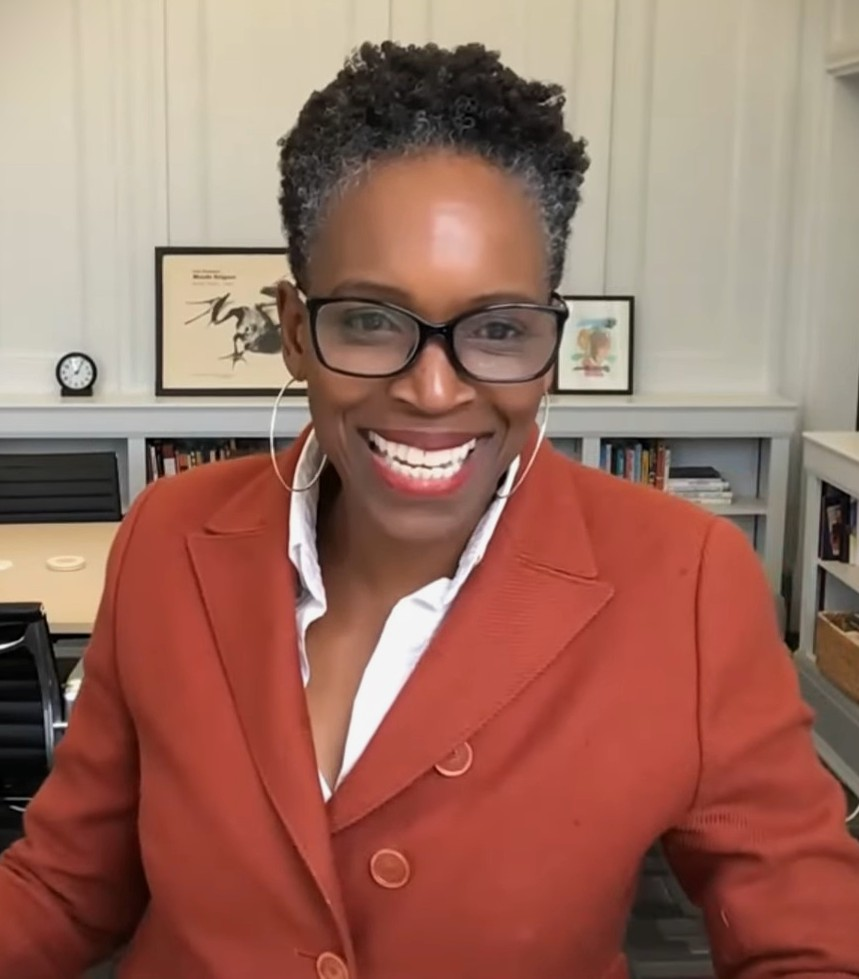
- Gilliam in 2022

11th President of Boston University
- Incumbent
- Assumed office July 1, 2024
- Preceded by: Kenneth W. Freeman (acting)

Personal details
- Born: Melissa Lynn Gilliam Washington, D.C., U.S.
- Relatives: Dorothy Butler Gilliam (mother); Sam Gilliam (father); Leah Gilliam (sister)
- Education: Yale University (BA); University of Oxford (MA); Harvard University (MD); University of Illinois Chicago (MPH)

Melissa Lynn Gilliam is an American pediatric and adolescent gynecologist and academic. She has been the 11th president of Boston University since July 2024. She was previously the provost of Ohio State University from 2021 to 2023 and the vice provost for diversity at the University of Chicago from 2016 to 2021.

== Early life and education ==
Gilliam was born in Washington, D.C., to journalist Dorothy Butler Gilliam and abstract painter Sam Gilliam. Her mother was the first African-American journalist for The Washington Post.

She earned her Bachelor's degree in English literature from Yale University, a Master of Arts degree in philosophy and politics from the University of Oxford, a medical degree from Harvard University, and a Master of Public Health degree from the University of Illinois Chicago.

== Career ==
Gilliam joined the faculty at the University of Chicago in 2005. She eventually became the chief of family planning and contraceptive research and head of the program in gynecology for children, adolescents, and young women at the University of Chicago Medical Center. In this role, her research team followed African American teenage mothers to see how their education, housing, exercise, weight gain, emotional state, and relationships influence their risk of a repeat pregnancy.

=== Research ===
Gilliam's research covers adolescent health and education, domestically and internationally, through methods including narrative, technology, and design. As of 2023, this work had received funding from The Bill & Melinda Gates Foundation, the National Institutes of Health, the MacArthur Foundation, and the Ford Foundation.

As a result of her research, Gilliam was named a Faculty Fellow of the Bucksbaum Institute for Clinical Excellence for the 2013–14 academic year. During this time, she founded the Center for Interdisciplinary Inquiry and Innovation in Sexual and Reproductive Health (Ci3), which used games, narrative, and design to understand and address the social and structural determinants of adolescent sexual and reproductive health. The Ci3's three labs are divided between focuses on game design, storytelling, and design thinking.

In the game design lab, Gilliam used video games and digital storytelling to discuss sexual violence prevention in a "safe risk taking" manner. In 2015, the lab developed a game called A Day in the Life to teach teenagers about HIV, bullying, teen pregnancy, healthy relationships, and intersections between home and school life.

=== Academic administration ===
In 2016, Gilliam was appointed as vice provost for academic leadership, advancement, and diversity and was named as the Ellen H. Block Professor in Health and Justice at the University of Chicago. In 2020, she was named as a Distinguished Service Professor in recognition of her work supporting faculty as vice provost.

In August 2021, Gilliam joined Ohio State University as executive vice president and provost, and joined the faculty as professor of obstetrics and gynecology. She became the first woman of color to serve as OSU's provost.

In October 2023, it was announced that Gilliam will become president at Boston University in July 2024, succeeding Kenneth Freeman.

== Boards and membership ==
In 2019, Gilliam was elected to the National Academy of Medicine for being "an authority on contraception and adolescent health".

In 2021, Gilliam joined the board of directors at Talis Biomedical.

Gilliam currently serves on the Board of Governors of Argonne National Laboratory and previously advised the National Institute of Child Health and Human Development (NICHD) and Food and Drug Administration (FDA).

== Publications ==
Gilliam has published a range of research and policy papers on reproductive health, including:

- The likelihood of placenta previa with greater number of cesarean deliveries and higher parity (2002)
- Cesarean delivery on request: reproductive consequences (2006)
- Interventions using new digital media to improve adolescent sexual health (2012)

== Personal life ==
Gilliam is married to physician-researcher William Grobman. They have two children, a son and a daughter.
