= Jonathan P. Binstock =

American curator and museum director

- Born: New York, United States
- Education: Washington University in St. Louis (B.A.); University of Michigan (M.A.; Ph.D.)
- Occupation(s): Curator, art historian, arts administrator
- Years active: 1997–present
- Employer: The Phillips Collection
- Title: Vradenburg Director and CEO

Jonathan P. Binstock is an American art historian, curator and museum administrator, and the director of The Phillips Collection in Washington, D.C., since 2023. He previously served as director of the Memorial Art Gallery in Rochester, New York, and as a curator at the Corcoran Gallery of Art in Washington, and the Pennsylvania Academy of the Fine Arts in Philadelphia. He also worked for Citibank's art finance and advisory division for several years as an art adviser. His primary curatorial and research focus is modern and contemporary art.

== Early life and education ==
Binstock was born in New York, and raised on Long Island.

He received a bachelor's degree in art history and psychology from Washington University in St. Louis. He completed his master's degree and Ph.D. in art history at the University of Michigan. His doctoral dissertation explored the career of artist Sam Gilliam, and Binstock visited Gilliam several times as part of his research. He received a Smithsonian American Art Museum fellowship to support his research in 1996. He taught at the University of Michigan while earning his graduate degrees.

== Career ==
=== Early curatorial career ===
Binstock served as assistant curator at the Pennsylvania Academy of the Fine Arts in the late 1990s, where he organized a major exhibition on Andy Warhol. He also taught at the University of Pennsylvania. He was soon hired by the Corcoran Gallery of Art in Washington, D.C., as curator of contemporary art, starting in 2000. He later told Artnet News that he had been hired on the condition that he begin organizing a retrospective exhibition for artist Sam Gilliam, which he curated in 2005.

Other exhibitions organized by Binstock during this period included two solo project-scale exhibitions by artist Jeremy Blake.

=== Citibank ===
In 2007, Binstock left the Corcoran and joined Citibank's art finance & advisory division. His responsibilities included assessing clients' private collections, advising clients on purchases of art, and assisting the bank in valuing art as financial assets for loans. He later said that the connections he made while working at Citi became an extensive fundraising network for his museum work.

=== Memorial Art Gallery ===
Binstock became the seventh director of the University of Rochester's Memorial Art Gallery (MAG) in 2014. He told the Democrat and Chronicle shortly after his hiring that he planned to leverage his connections from his time as an art adviser to help raise money to sustain the museum, which he viewed as his primary role as director. He helped secure donations to renovate an exhibition space, and commissioned work by artist Isaac Julien.

=== Phillips Collection ===
In 2022, The Phillips Collection in Washington announced that Binstock would become the seventh director of the museum, where he began in March 2023.

== Personal life ==
Binstock is married, and he and his wife Ann have one daughter.
