= Rockne Krebs =

American artist (1938–2011)

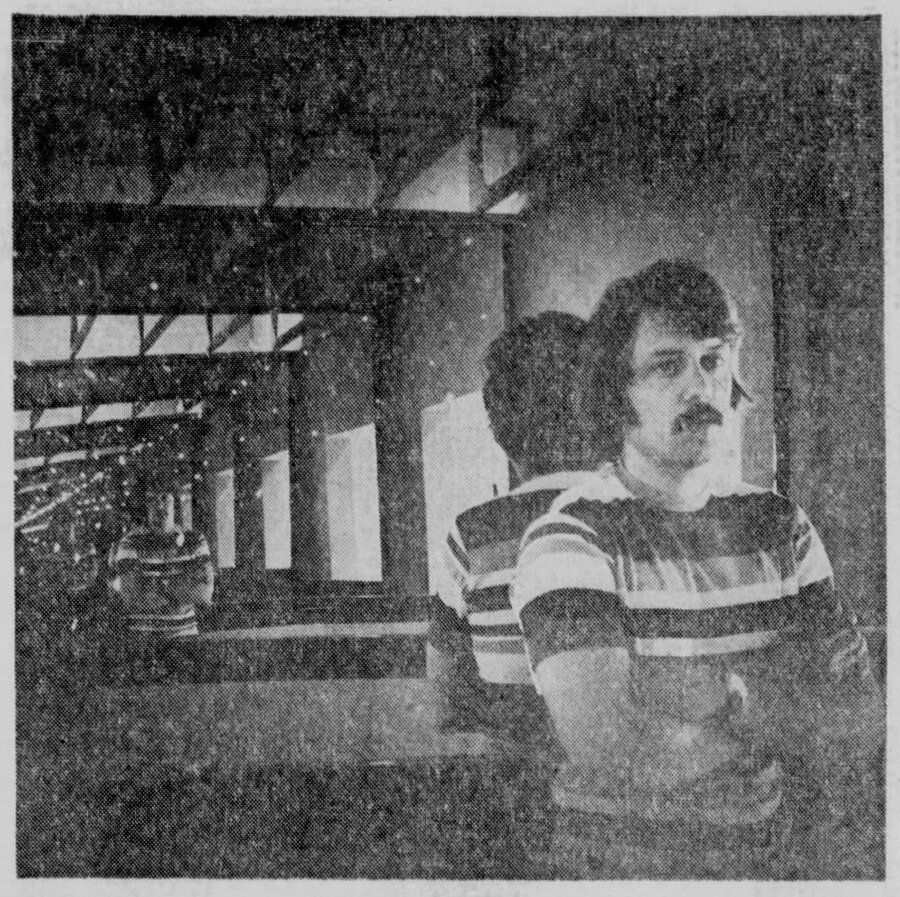
- Krebs photographed in 1970
- Born: December 24, 1938; Kansas City, Missouri, U.S.
- Died: October 10, 2011 (aged 72); Washington, D.C., U.S.
- Education: University of Kansas
- Known for: Laser and Light sculptor
- Awards: Illuminating Engineering Society Award; Night Beautiful Award
- Website: / Official site

Rockne Krebs (December 24, 1938 – October 10, 2011) was a contemporary American artist and sculptor.

== Biography ==
=== Early life ===
Krebs was born on December 24, 1938, in Kansas City, Missouri. He graduated from the University of Kansas in 1961 and moved to Washington after he joined the Navy. While living there, he found love for art through the Washington Color School art movement, and was influenced by Anthony Caro sculptures and Kenneth Noland paintings.

=== Career ===
==== 1968–1976 ====
In 1968 he designed the first three-dimensional laser sculpture which can be found in Long Beach, California. He did the same type of sculptures nationwide in 25 cities and later on he represented United States at Expo '70 in Osaka, Japan. In 1969, he and his fellow engineers worked at Hewlett-Packard in California where their job was to develop some environmental sculptures. On one such project he erected lasers at the Mount Wilson's observatory and its beam stretched for eight miles toward Caltech. The same year, he also created laser sculptures for the Gulf of Mexico and St. Petersburg, Florida. In 1974 he set up temporary laser installations aiming beams across the Potomac River onto the Kennedy Center in Washington, DC; and down the McKeldin Mall onto the Administration Building at the University of Maryland. In 1976 he created a laser installation for the National Endowment for the Arts at the Kennedy Space Center called Sun Dog and a year later created The One Night Stand, which was his first fireworks installations.

==== 1978–1985 ====
In 1978 he created a collage called Green Air at the Fort Worth Art Museum in Texas and in 1979 he did an installation called Still Green at the Disneyland Hotel. In 1980 he created another sculpture called The Source which was erected in Washington D.C. and the same year looked for approval from Secret Service before he can use argon and krypton lasers over the Lincoln Memorial. In 1985 he constructed two sculptures in Maryland one called Crystal Willow which can be found in Bethesda the other one is called The Vine Covered Passarelle which is located in Reisterstown Plaza Metro Station of Baltimore.

==== 1987–1996 ====
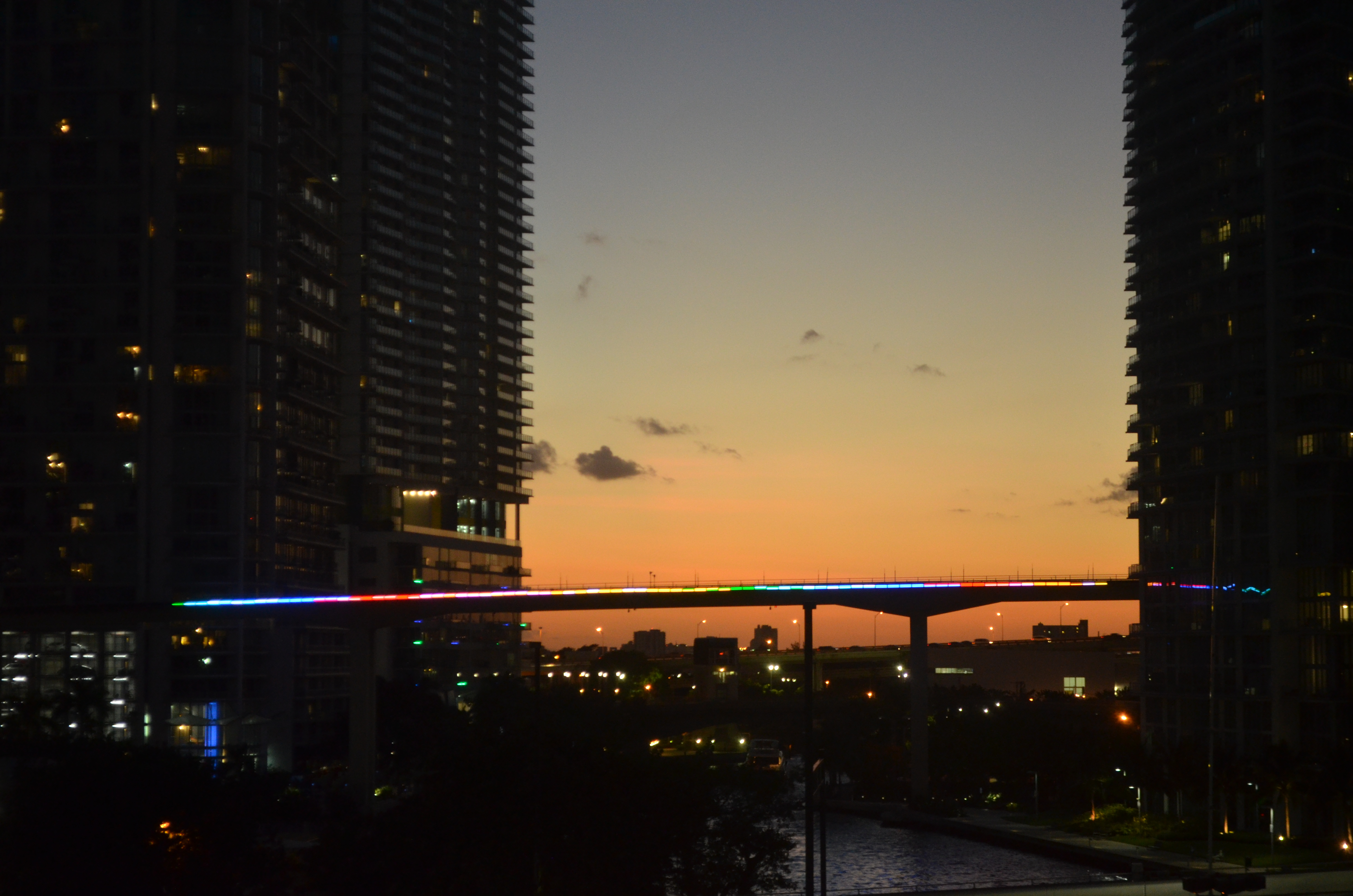
Miami Line, 1984. Metrorail's Miami River Bridge

In 1987 he erected a Neo-Green laser installation at the Memorial Art Gallery and the University of Rochester in Rochester, New York. The same year he commissioned The Miami Line bridge over the Miami River. In 1989 he installed St. Patrick's Solar Piece at the St. Patrick's Episcopal Church in Washington D.C. and four years later built The Red River Bridge over Bossier City, Louisiana. In 1994 he created Pegasus Cloud Projection in Sacramento, California and two years later decorated CNN Center in Atlanta, Georgia with the Good Luck World laser projection for the 1996 Summer Olympics. After the Olympics the piece was moved to the Indianapolis Museum of Art where it still remain to this day.

==== 21st century ====
From 2003 till his death he was a member of the Sons of the American Revolution. In 2005 he did his last project called the Day Star for the Children's Inn at the National Institute of Health, NIH, in Bethesda, Maryland before he died from heart and lung disease on October 10, 2011, at the Washington Hospital Center. During his life he received numerous fellowships from the Guggenheim Foundation and the National Endowment for the Arts and was also awarded the Illuminating Engineering Society Award for his neon art at The Miami Line and Night Beautiful Award from Florida Power & Light respectively.
