= Transeuropa =

Transeuropa or TransEuropa or Trans-Europa or variation, may refer to:

- TransEuropa (board game), a board game published by Rio Grande games
- Transeuropa Compañía de Aviación (Trans-Europa), a former charter airline from Spain that operated from 1965 until 1982.
- M/S Transeuropa, a Hansa-class ferry originally built by Stocznia Gdanska, Poland
- Transeuropa Ferries, ferries between Ostend, Belgium and Ramsgate, England
- Transeuropa Festival, an annual festival of culture, arts and politics held simultaneously in different European cities.
- Transeuropa (Theater festival), a triennial theater festival in Germany organized in cooperation with the University of Hildesheim

== See also ==
- Europa (disambiguation)
- Trans (disambiguation)
- Trans Euro Trail (TET) a motorcycle backpacking trail
- Air Transport Europe (ICAO airline code: EAT; callsign: TRANS EUROPE), a Slovakian airline
- Trans Europe Foot Race, a multiday ultramarathon across Europe
- Trans Europe Halles (TEH), a trans-European network of cultural centres
- Trans Europ Express (disambiguation)
- Transeuropean (disambiguation)
- Pan-European (disambiguation)
