= Transeuropean =

Transeuropean or Trans-European or variant, may refer to:

- Trans European Airways (IATA airline code: HE; ICAO airline code: TEA; callsign: BELGAIR), former Belgian airline
- Trans European Aviation, former British charter airline
- Trans-European Suture Zone (geology) a geographic feature, the interface between the Eastern European Craton and later accretions
- Trans-European Division of Seventh-day Adventists (TED)
- Trans-European Networks (TEN), EU defined networks
- Trans-European Motorways (TEM), a UN project
- Trans-European Trunked Radio, a trunked radio network

== See also ==
- Trans (disambiguation)
- European (disambiguation)
- Trans Euro Trail (TET) a motorcycle backpacking trail
- Transeuropa Compañía de Aviación (IATA airline code: TR; callsign: TRANSEUOPA), operating as Trans-Europa, a former Spanish airline
- Air Transport Europe (ICAO airline code: EAT; callsign: TRANS EUROPE), a Slovakian airline
- Trans Europe Foot Race, a multiday ultramarathon across Europe
- Trans Europe Halles (TEH), a trans-European network of cultural centres
- Pan-European (disambiguation)
- Transeuropa (disambiguation)
