= Tet =

Tet or TET may refer to:

== Vietnam ==
- Tết or Tết Nguyên Đán, the Vietnamese new year, Lunar new year
- Tet Offensive, a military campaign during the Vietnam War that began in 1968
  - Tet 1969

== Geography ==
- Têt (river) in Roussillon, France
- Tét, a town in Hungary
- Tét District, a district in northwestern Hungary

== Character, symbol, abbreviation, or acronym ==
- Tet or teth, tēth, or Ṭāʾ, a Semitic abjad character
- tet, the ISO 639-2 code for Tetum
- Equal temperament, abbreviated as 12-TET, 19-TET, and so on
- Teacher Eligibility Test, a teachers' entrance test
- Tet methylcytosine dioxygenase 1, or TET1, an enzyme
- Tetrachloride
- Tetrahedron
- Tetralogy of Fallot

== Art, entertainment, and media ==
- Tet (Morris Louis painting), a 1958 painting
- Tet, enormous tetrahedral space station from the 2013 film Oblivion
- TET (TV channel), a Ukrainian TV channel
- Tamil Entertainment Television (TET), a Canadian TV channel
- Tet, a god in the light novel No Game No Life
- The name of Latvian telecommunications provider Lattelecom since April 2019

== Other uses ==
- Chingozi Airport, Tete, Mozambique, with IATA code TET
- TET, a Finnish work practice program
- Tet Garcia (born 1940), Governor of Bataan, The Philippines
- Tet Wada (born 1973), Japanese-American actor
- Trans Euro Trail, Offroad Tracks in Europe
- TET enzymes, family of demethylating proteins
- Teth, the second ranking threat level for abnormalities in the Korean video game Lobotomy Corporation

== See also ==
- TETS (disambiguation)
