= Tranz (disambiguation) =

"Tranz" is a 2018 song by British virtual band Gorillaz.

Tranz may also refer to:

- Tranz Metro, a former New Zealand public transport operator
- Tranz Rail, the main rail operator in New Zealand from 1991 to 2003

== See also ==
- Tranz Am, a 1983 action video game
- Trance (disambiguation)
- Trans (disambiguation)
