= TransCanada =

TransCanada or variation, may refer to:

- Trans Canada Trail, a hiking trail system
- Trans-Canada Highway, primary highway that runs across Canada
- Trans-Canada Air Lines, predecessor to Air Canada
- TC Energy, formerly TransCanada Corporation, an energy company based in Calgary, Alberta
- TransCanada Tower, Calgary, an office tower located in Calgary, Alberta
- TransCanada pipeline, a petro-energy pipeline maintained by TransCanada Pipelines
- Trans-Canada Trophy, CASI award for outstanding achievement in aerospace

== See also ==
- Canada (disambiguation)
- Trans (disambiguation)
