= Kari Liuhto =

Kari Tapani Liuhto (born 26 December 1967 in Joutseno) is Finland's first professor of intelligence studies and the director of the Centrum Balticum Foundation. Liuhto is also the editor-in-chief of the English-language review called as Baltic Rim Economies and of the Finnish-language Pulloposti column series.

== Education ==
Kari Liuhto completed his matriculation examination at the Joutsenon lukio in the spring of 1986. After the obligatory military service (course 183 at the Finnish Reserve Officer School), Liuhto began his studies at the Turku School of Economics in the autumn of 1987. At the same time, Liuhto got the right to study at the Kyiv State University, where he studied the Russian philology. In the spring of 1988 Liuhto returned from Kyiv to the Turku School of Economics where he graduated in 1991. Liuhto began his doctoral studies at the University of Glasgow in the United Kingdom in 1993 where he defended his dissertation three years later, earning his Ph.D. In 2000, Liuhto completed his doctorate in international business at the Turku School of Economics. Liuhto's first doctoral dissertation dealt with the economic transformation in the newly independent Estonia and the second doctorate was on the managerial change in six former Soviet republics.

== Academic career ==
Kari Liuhto started as an assistant at the Institute for East-West Trade at the Turku School of Economics on 15 March 1991. Liuhto served in numerous academic positions at the Turku School of Economics before starting as a professor at the Lappeenranta University of Technology at the end of 1997. The Lappeenranta University of Technology nominated Liuhto as a full professor in January 2000. Liuhto worked in Lappeenranta through the autumn of 2003 when he was invited to hold a chair in international business at the Turku School of Economics and the post of Director of the Pan-European Institute. Since August 2011, Liuhto has also served as part-time director of the Centrum Balticum Foundation, in addition to the tasks mentioned earlier. In January 2025, Liuhto began his role as professor of intelligence studies, a joint professorship between the Finnish National Defence University and the Turku School of Economics.

== Research and teaching work ==
Liuhto's current research focuses on pressing issues in intelligence studies, such as Russian espionage and influence in the West. Alongside his own research work, Liuhto has directed numerous research projects financed by bodies such as the European Commission, the Academy of Finland, the Prime Minister's Office, and several Finnish government ministries. Liuhto has also been used as an expert by several committees in the Finnish Parliament. Liuhto has been a visiting lecturer at numerous universities both in Finland and abroad.

== Awards and honours ==
- The Cross of the Finnish Boarder Guard for Outstanding Military Service, May 1987 (Sissiristi)
- Knight, First Class, of the Order of the White Rose of Finland, December 2007
- Honorary doctorate from the Saint Petersburg State University of Economics (FINEC/UNECON), September 2011 - Liuhto gave up this tribute after Russia launched a military campaign against Ukraine in late February 2022.
- Commander (FL C), of the Order of the Lion of Finland, December 2024
