= 1981 in motoring =

1981 in motoring deals with developments in the automotive industry that occurred in 1981, listed by country. The automotive industry designs, develops, manufactures, markets, and sells motor vehicles.

== United Kingdom ==
General Motors introduced a new range of medium-sized family cars, the "J Car". The British-built version of the car was called the Vauxhall Cavalier which launched in September, while its German twin was sold as the Opel Ascona. This incarnation of the car had front-wheel drive and a hatchback bodystyle to run alongside the saloon. The engine line-up included 1.3 L and 1.6 L petrol units as well as a 1.6 L diesel, with larger engined models to go on sale in the near future. The new car was also sold by other brands of General Motors, including Chevrolet in the USA and Holden in Australia.

After 11 years on sale, during which time it was sold as a Hillman, Chrysler and finally a Talbot, production of the Avenger ceased under Peugeot ownership. It had gradually declined in popularity following the launch of the more modern Horizon and Alpine models during the late 1970s.

Talbot's entry-level model, the Sunbeam, ceased production in late 1981 and was succeeded by the Talbot Samba a compact three-door hatchback which used the same underpinnings and bodyshell as the Peugeot 104. A cabriolet model would follow later.

British Leyland announced the end of Austin Maxi production in July 1981, 12 years after the car first went on sale. There was no direct successor, although a new family hatchback – first planned towards the end of the 1970s – would be launched by early 1983. Meanwhile, British Leyland enjoyed success with its new Metro compact hatchback as Lady Diana Spencer bought 1 prior to her marriage to Charles, Prince of Wales (now Charles III).

Also, British Leyland ceased production of the Princess after six years. Its successor, the Austin Ambassador, was a facelifted version of the original 1975 car, but the most significant change was the transition from a saloon to a hatchback bodystyle. The new car would only be sold in Britain.

British Leyland's Triumph division was undergoing a major transformation for 1981. The Dolomite and TR7 ranges ceased production after a collective lifespan of 17 years. The marque would include one single model: the Acclaim, which was the result of a venture with Honda. The Acclaim was powered by a 1.3 L overhead camshaft petrol engine capable of 97 mph. Production of the new car, which debuted in 1980 in Japan as the Honda Ballade, took place at the Cowley plant in Oxford. The venture with Honda also saw development work begin on a new car which was expected to replace the Rover SD1 halfway through the decade. The Triumph name disappeared on sports cars with the demise of the Triumph TR7 in October, on the closure of the Speke factory near Liverpool which had been producing Triumph cars since 1959.

== France ==
Renault introduced a new front-wheel-drive range of saloons – the R9 – at the end of 1981, giving it a competitor for the new-for-1980 Ford Escort. The initial engine range included 1.1 and 1.4 petrol engines; larger engined models followed. The 1.4 version was available with a five-speed manual gearbox, a rarity in comparable cars of the time. The American market received a version of the 9, known as the Renault Alliance, as Renault attempted to gain more popularity at the far side of the Atlantic through its partnership with the American Motors Corporation. The Renault 9 made an impact in Europe, as the continent's motoring journalists voted it Car of the Year for 1982 ahead of the two favourites; the Vauxhall Cavalier/Opel Ascona and Volkswagen Polo.

== Germany ==
Volkswagen brought its range up to date for the 1980s by launching new generations of its Polo supermini and Passat large family car. Both cars were a huge success during their original 1970s incarnations. The Passat continued as a hatchback and estate, while the Polo hatchback was joined by a saloon model which (in Europe) no longer wore the Derby nameplate which was seen on the booted version of the original Polo. The Polo featured a new vertical tailgate which had the appearance of an estate rather than the hatchback it was officially marketed as.

The Audi Quattro was imported to British shores a year after going on sale in its homeland. With a 2.1 L turbo engine and four-wheel drive, the coupé was capable of around 140 mph and enjoyed a successful motorsport career.

Mercedes-Benz strengthened its position as one of the world's most desirable brands of car by introducing an all-new version of the acclaimed S-Class luxury saloon. The range-topper of the new S-Class range was the 560SEL, which was powered by a 5.5 L V8 petrol engine and had a top speed of approximately 150 mph, making it one of the fastest four-door cars made up to that time.

== Italy ==
After almost a decade on sale in Europe, Fiat exported the X1/9 sports car to America.

== Spain ==
Following the split from Fiat, SEAT rebranded its Fiat-based model range, with the Panda becoming the Marbella, the Ritmo becoming the Ronda and the 127 becoming the Fura.

== Japan ==
The first generation Accord was a worldwide sales success for Honda, showing that it could build a rival for the Ford Cortina. The Americans were particularly impressed by the Accord, though its sales success was not quite matched in Europe. The new model had improved fuel economy, despite using the same 1.8 L petrol engine that powered the original Accord.

The Toyota Celica entered its third incarnation with a much more modern body style, primarily aimed at the American market. Power came from 1.6 L, 1.8 L, 2.0 L and 2.4 L petrol engines. There was also a three-door liftback version. For those who wanted high performance, European buyers finally got the Celica Supra, which came with a 2.8 L engine and was fast enough to be considered a serious competitor for the likes of the Porsche 924.

== See also ==
- 1980 in motoring – the previous year
- 1982 in motoring – the next year
