= Tran =

Tran may refer to:

== Arts and entertainment ==
- Tran (novel), a novel in the Janissaries series named for a fictional planet
- Dr. Tran, an animated miniseries

== People ==
- Trần (陳), a Vietnamese surname, including a list of people named Trần or Tran
- Tran, member of the Nazi-era comedy duo Tran and Helle

== Other uses ==
- Tran, Bulgaria, a small town
- Trần dynasty, 陳朝 a Vietnamese dynasty from 1225 to 1400

== See also ==
- Trana (disambiguation)
- Trans (disambiguation)
- Tron (disambiguation)
