= 1980 in motoring =

1980 in motoring deals with developments in the automotive industry that occurred in 1980, listed by country. The automotive industry designs, develops, manufactures, markets, and sells motor vehicles.

== United States ==
Cadillac introduced its first six-cylinder engine in April.

== United Kingdom ==
British Leyland introduced the Austin Metro in October, a compact three-door hatchback which was sold alongside the Mini and was powered by the 1.0 and 1.3 petrol engines that were familiar in other BL products. The Metro took five years and cost hundreds of millions of pounds to develop and left BL without enough money for any more immediate all-new cars. So the nine-year-old Morris Marina was restyled to become the Morris Ital in July.

The launch of the Metro saw cutbacks of BL's Mini and Allegro ranges, while more significantly the MG factory at Abingdon closed and production of the MG B and Midget finished after 19 years, as did the Canley plant in Coventry, a move which signalled the end for the Triumph Dolomite.

Ford's Escort was moved onto a front-wheel drive hatchback format with 3 or 5 doors after 12 years as a rear-wheel-drive saloon in September as the MK3. As before, there was also an estate version available, initially as a 3-door model but a 5-door version would appear in 1983. The engine line-up featured Ford's new CVH Engine in 1.3 and 1.6 form. The 1.1 Valencia OHV Engine from the Fiesta was also available. A performance version of the car called XR3 with a twin choke version of the 1.6 CVH Engine was Fords challenger to the VW Golf GTi. The new Escort won the European Car of the Year award for 1981. It would go on to be the best-selling car of the decade.

In March, Vauxhall began sales of its all-new Astra front-wheel drive hatchback, saloon and estate which was launched in the UK before the end of 1979 as the German-built Opel Kadett. It replaced the Viva. UK production began in late 1981.

== France ==
Peugeot unveiled the new 505, a rear-wheel drive range of saloons and estates which were designed as an eventual replacement for the long-running 504 and a competitor for the likes of the Ford Granada, Rover SD1 and Vauxhall Carlton.

The Peugeot-owned Talbot marque (created on the company's acquisition of Chrysler Europe in 1979) has seen the launch of the Tagora, a large four-door saloon which is to be built in France in limited numbers and would go on sale in Spring 1981. The Alpine hatchback now also forms the basis of the Solara saloon.

Production of the Renault 12 finished two years after the launch of its successor - the R18. The R12 had been on sale for 11 years, though Romanian production of the car continue under licence by Dacia until 2004.

== Italy ==
Fiat introduced a new entry-level three-door hatchback - the Panda - as a more modern and practical alternative to the rear-engined 126 in February. It shared a 652cc two-cylinder engine with the 126, but this version of the Panda was only sold on the domestic market. Spanish customers were offered the SEAT Panda. UK sales began in May 1981.

Lancia began exporting its new Delta range of five-door medium-sized hatchbacks, designed as direct competitors for the Volkswagen Golf and Ford Escort. Sales began in Italy at the end of 1979 and the ultra-modern Delta was voted European Car of the Year. For the Swedish market, there was a Saab model known as the 600.

1980 saw a relaunch of Lancia's Monte Carlo sports car, a year after it was withdrawn from production. The relaunched Monte Carlo sports a much improved braking system - with refinements being made in response to heavy criticism over safety issues - but few other significant changes.

== Spain ==
Fiat withdrew its subsidisation of the SEAT marque, a venture between themselves and the Spanish government. Though production of SEAT's Fiat-based models continued, licensing reasons prevented them from using the same nameplates as the Italian models from which they were derived.

== Sweden ==
The newly launched Saab 900 range of upmarket hatchbacks was joined by a smaller, entry-level model - the Saab 600 - which was a clone of the Lancia Delta and was only sold in Sweden and Norway.

== Germany ==
Volkswagen updated the 30-year-old Transporter range to give it an entirely new bodyshell, but the air-cooled engines and rear-wheel drive chassis continued largely unchanged. The new range of vans and people carriers had an improved braking system and improved specification levels, with some models having power steering and air-conditioning.

Volkswagen expanded its commercial vehicle range by launching the Caddy, a Golf-based range of compact vans and pickup trucks.

== Eastern Europe ==
Lada facelifted its decade-old Fiat-based range of saloons and estates and renamed them "Riva". The car's technology remained unchanged, with power still coming from 1.2, 1.3, 1.5 and 1.6 petrol engines. However, the Riva did not arrive on markets including the United Kingdom until 1983, with the original Lada continuing on those markets until then.

== Japan ==
A year after going on sale in its homeland, the latest generation of the Toyota Corolla went on sale in Europe. The traditional rear-wheel drive chassis and saloon bodystyle continued, as did the 1.3, 1.6 and 1.8 petrol engines.

Toyota gave its rear-wheel drive supermini the Starlet, a major facelift which included square front headlights instead of round ones. The old 1.0, 1.2 and 1.3 power units were replaced by new 12-valve ones which gave more power and better economy.

Honda introduced a new medium-sized family saloon - the Ballade - which gave traditionalists a viable alternative to the Civic hatchback. It will be imported to the US as a Civic, but the British version will go into production next year as part of a venture with British Leyland.

The Civic, Honda's best-selling model, was redesigned to exhibit a more aerodynamic shape and a more extensive range of trim levels. The 1.3 and 1.5 petrol engines are both new to the range, replacing the outdated 1.3 power unit from the original Civic range.

Nissan bolstered its Datsun brand to give European buyers an alternative to the Ford Cortina. Its latest generation Bluebird comes in a range of saloons, estates and coupes. The coupe version comes in "SSS" form with a more powerful version of the already good 2.0 power unit. The standard 1.6, 1.8 and 2.0 petrol engines are carried over from the previous range, though the underpowered 1.4 unit has been discontinued.

Mazda moved to front-wheel drive for its popular 323 hatchback, which will be sold in Australia as the Ford Meteor and Ford Laser as part of Mazda's venture with Ford. The latest 323 had 1.1, 1.3 and 1.5 petrol engines, and the car's contemporary body was designed with the help of Ford's design team. Production of the rear-wheel drive estate, part of the pre-1980 range continues.

== See also ==
- 1979 in motoring - the previous year
- 1981 in motoring - the next year
