= Pan-European =

Pan-European can refer to:

- Pan-European identity
- Pan-European corridors
  - Pan-European Corridor X
  - Pan-European Corridor Xa
- Pan European Game Information
- Pan-European Institute
- Pan-European nationalism
- Pan-European Oil Pipeline
- Pan-European Pension
- Pan-European Picnic
- Paneuropean Union, a European unification group
  - PanEuropa Armenia
- Paneuropean Working Group of the European Parliament
- Honda ST series motorcycles, sold as the Pan-European in the UK & Europe

== See also ==
- European integration
- European political party
- Pro-Europeanism
- Transeuropean (disambiguation)
- Transeuropa (disambiguation)
- European (disambiguation)
- Pan (disambiguation)
- Proto-Indo-European language
