= Immit =

Immit may refer to:

- IMMIT or International Master in Management of Information Technology
- Immit, Pakistan, village in Ishkoman Valley, Pakistan
