= TETS =

TETS may refer to one of the following:

- Tetramethylenedisulfotetramine
- Trains Entering Terminal Stations, a train protection system
- TETs, a transliteration of the Russian term for cogeneration power stations as seen in station names

== See also ==
- Tet (disambiguation)
