= Trans America Trail =

Multiuse transcontinental vehicular route

The TransAmerica Trail or TAT is a 4,253-mile (6,845 km) transcontinental vehicular route, intended as a recreational pathway across the United States using a minimum of paved roads, traveled by dual-sport motorcycles, off-road vehicle, or touring bicycle.

The trail was scouted by Sam Correro in 1984 who spent 12 years assembling the route using only publicly accessible roads and trails. To legally travel on the TAT, vehicles and drivers must be appropriately licensed for their type and class.

== Route ==
The original route starts in Eastern Tennessee (Tellico Plains) and makes its way through Mississippi, Arkansas including the Ozarks, Oklahoma, New Mexico, Colorado, Utah, Idaho and finishes on the Oregon Coast at Battle Rock in Port Orford. This route has since been unofficially supplemented by an open source community with additional eastern starting points on the New York and North Carolina coasts, and end points in Oregon and California.

The eastern portion of the route mainly consists of farm roads and forestry tracks which become more severe toward the Southern Rocky Mountains where it covers several high passes. The desert of Utah follows, then Sawtooth National Forest of Idaho and the Deschutes National Forest of Oregon, to name a few.

== Types of travelers and vehicles ==
The trail is traveled mainly by riders of motorcycles who can choose to be self sufficient by camping, often rough (or wild camping), motel supported or vehicle supported. Others choose to travel by ATV or 4x4 vehicle, often in overlander configuration. Bicyclists also utilize the route, often long-distance touring cyclists. Skill sets of riders on the trail vary from veteran riders with decades of off-road experience, to well-prepared and educated beginners.

Motorcycle types are usually dual-sport or adventure style motorcycles, such as the Kawasaki KLR 650 or the BMW R1200GS, due to their higher ground clearance, suspension travel, and tires being better suited for the various terrain on the TAT. The trail has also been completed by less conventional motorcycles, such as the Honda Grom and CT series trail bikes.

Vehicles with 4 or more wheels are largely body-on-frame trucks, commonly outfitted with raised suspension, recovery equipment, and other off-road oriented modifications. Due to the challenging obstacles on the trail, these are less common. Side-by-sides, or SXSs. are only street legal in the state of Montana, and therefore cannot legally travel on the public roads of the TAT.

In the summer of 2021, journalists from MotorTrend became the first to cross the Trans America Trail in an electric vehicle, using a stock Rivian R1T.

== See also ==
- Adventure Cycling Route Network
- Trans Euro Trail
- Trans Canada Trail
