= Trans Europ Express (disambiguation) =

Trans Europ Express is a former international train network in Europe.

It may also refer to:

- Trans-Europ-Express (film) (French: Trans-Europ-Express), a 1966 film written and directed by Alain Robbe-Grillet
- Trans-Europe Express (album) (German: Trans Europa Express), by Kraftwerk
  - "Trans-Europe Express" (song) (German: Trans-Europa Express), the album's title track

== See also ==
- Trans-Euro Express, a stageplay by Gary Duggan
- Transeuropa (disambiguation)
