= IMMIT =

IMMIT Program is the acronym for International Master in Management of Information Technology.

The program is offered as a joint Degree collaboration between three European institutions:

- IAE Aix-Marseille Graduate School of Management in France
- Turku School of Economics in Finland
- Tilburg University in The Netherlands

The aim of the program is to capitalize on each University's strengths.

First by starting on Management, then moving to Information Management and Integration of IS.
