= European =

European, or Europeans, may refer to:

== In general ==
- European, an adjective referring to something of, from, or related to Europe
  - European people
  - Ethnic groups in Europe
  - Demographics of Europe
  - European cuisine, the cuisines of Europe and other Western countries
  - European culture, the collective culture of Europe or individual cultures of European countries
  - European English, referring to a version of English that is spoken by people in continental Europe.
- European, an adjective referring to something of, from, or related to the European Union
  - European Union citizenship
  - Demographics of the European Union

== In publishing ==
- The European (1953 magazine), a far-right cultural and political magazine published 1953–1959
- The European (newspaper), a British weekly newspaper published 1990–1998 by Robert Maxwell
- The European (2009 magazine), a German magazine first published in September 2009
- The European Magazine, a magazine published in London 1782–1826
- The New European, a British weekly pop-up newspaper first published in July 2016

== Other uses ==
- SS European
- Europeans (band), a British post-punk group, from Bristol

== See also ==
- Europe (disambiguation)
- The Europeans (disambiguation)
- Transeuropean (disambiguation)
- Pan-European (disambiguation)
- European African
- "White people", a term for set of ethnic groups with varying definitions
