= The Europeans (disambiguation) =

The Europeans is an 1878 short novel by Henry James.

The Europeans may also refer to:

- The Europeans (1979 film), a Merchant Ivory film based on Henry James' novel
- The Europeans (2020 film), a Spanish film based on a 1960 novel by Rafael Azcona
- The Europeans (band), a British New Wave rock group (1981–85)
- The Europeans (podcast), a podcast about European current affairs
- The Europeans, a book by Italian journalist Luigi Barzini Jr. (1983)
- The Europeans cricket team, an Indian first-class cricket team (1877–1948)

== See also ==
- Europeans (band), a British post-punk group from Bristol (1977–79)
- European (disambiguation)
