= Tet (Morris Louis painting) =

1958 painting by Morris Louis

Tet (1958), by Morris Louis, is a painting composed of four fan-like stains of blues, greens, violets, and yellows. The colors converge and slide into each other, giving them the qualities of liquid. The pools at the bottom of the painting reveal the artist's method and process; the colors have forged deltas originating from these concentrated areas of watered down pigment. Louis used gravity to manipulate the thinned paint, resulting in these streams and fans of color. Currently it is in the Whitney Museum of American Art and was exhibited in "American Art, 1940–1965: Traditions Reconsidered" and in the Whitney exhibit "Synthetic".

Morris Louis (née Morris Louis Bernstein) was an American painter who is often categorized in the second generation of Abstract Expressionists, but has also been placed in the Color Field artists and the Minimalists. His painting Tet, from 1958, is an example of his work with the staining method which he used for the majority of his career. Louis was a prodigy of the notable critic Clement Greenberg. Greenberg was introduced to Louis via Kenneth Noland, a friend of the artist who also lived in Washington DC. Greenberg in turn introduced Louis to galleries and to artists in New York such as Barnett Newman, Mark Rothko, and Helen Frankenthaler. It was Frankenthaler who created the technique of staining: a process using thinned paint and gravity on an unstretched and untreated canvas.

Greenberg admired Frankenthaler's technique because of his theories on "purism" within the arts. Greenberg believed that painting's one characteristic which distinguished it from other art forms was its "flatness." This quality was enhanced by the staining process. The paint actually soaked into the surface of the canvas, showing no three-dimensional qualities. Frankenthaler's painting Mountains and Sea would stand as Louis's primary influence in his shift from mimicry of German Expressionism to his more recognizable work with staining. After Greenberg introduced Louis to the technique, he championed the artist's paintings as "pure" paintings, more so even than Greenberg's previous prodigy, Jackson Pollock.

Louis' paintings are divided into several groups, Tet belonging to the Veils II series. Louis used his staining technique throughout his short career, and his ability to mix both "muddiness and density" allow individual pigments to be simultaneously highlighted and muted within the same canvas. As Charles Millard describes, Louis's works were finely articulated, yet distinctly indistinct, embodying a conflation of clear intent and chaotic chance. While there are portions on Tet's surface that are undoubtedly muddy, the density and depth within the murky concentrations of pigment reveal Louis' ability to create a pseudo-illusionistic surface, more so even than his contemporary Barnett Newman's pulsing pigments, seen in works such as Vir Heroicus Sublimis. Louis was more widely accepted by critics and the public than Newman, especially due to the nature-like allusions in his work. Once again using the river delta imagery, Louis's Tet can be seen as a pseudo-illusionistic allusion to nature. Many of his other works can be seen as references to nature as well.

Perhaps the reason Louis's Tet was so successful was because of the variation in pigment which allowed the colors to mix as well as stand out. Louis used this quality in his works in order to create an "articulation" amongst the colors as well as an overall atmospheric effect. The colors are the subject matter in his works. Louis allowed the paint to carve its own paths on the canvas, and the natural formations that resulted were much more accessible than previous Abstract Expressionist paintings. The viewer could discern nature-like shapes and forms in Louis's work, allowing them to have a much more personal experience with the work, rather than Newman's difficult and extremely abstracted works.

Although the natural formations were so popular, they presented a difficulty for Louis. According to Millard, a notable critic of Louis's works, "they are most noticeable around the darkest and densest of the Veils, the darkness and density resulting from the very intensity of the hues seen at the edges, and suggest the difficulty of trying to make hue speak when only pale values result in openness when poured over one another..." In these fields of color, it seems nearly impossible to create intensity and pictorial focus in the paintings. Louis' paintings are unsaturated, so the individual colors do not call for focus. It seems that Louis understood the lack of a focal point and corrected it with the introduction of columns and fans. By adjusting the flow of the paints into various different shapes, he was able to create very specific focal points, without which the works would likely have been less successful. These flows can be viewed in Number 99 (1959) and Convergent (1954), in which the paint fans out in rounded trails and amorphous amoeba-like shapes.

Finally, Louis' Tet can be seen as a form of Symbolist painting. Michael Fried described Louis' paintings as symbolist in their "impersonality" and "absolute"-ness. Louis had changed his name from Bernstein, but his Jewish upbringing was a large influence on his works as can be seen in the symbols of his early works. Louis' early works contained more obvious symbology, such as a Star of David in Untitled (Jewish Star) (1951), but Fried argued that his works were not directly influenced by symbolism, but were rather connected to it in their mimicry of the Symbolist model: "of a work of art as having a life of its own, independent of its maker and corresponding to, rather than imitating, the organic self-sufficiency of nature." Tet can be seen as symbolism in its use of the natural flow of pigment and the organic allusion it achieved. Louis' works achieved a certain spiritual experience for the viewer, one which was likely a direct result of Louis' Jewish upbringing.
