= Pan-European Institute =

Finnish research institute, part of the University of Turku

The Pan-European Institute (PEI) (Finnish Pan-Eurooppa Instituutti) is a Finnish research institute operating at Turku School of Economics (TSE), which is part of the University of Turku. PEI focuses on the research and observation of the economic and social development, particularly in the Baltic Sea region economies and in the EU’s eastern neighbouring countries.

== Organisation ==
In terms of administration, PEI is part of the department of marketing and international business at Turku School of Economics. The institute employs about 10 researchers, most of whom work with project-based funding. The director of the unit is Professor Kari Liuhto from Turku School of Economics.

The operation of the Pan-European Institute is supported by an advisory body, which is composed of the chair and 10 members. In May 2020, the institute's advisory body consisted of:

Chair:

Juhani Wihanto, CEO, Wihanto Group

Members:

- Matti Anttonen, Permanent State Secretary, Ministry for Foreign Affairs
- Erik Helin, CEO, Spectra
- Mikko Ketonen, chairman of the board (emeritus), TS-Yhtymä Oy
- Urpo Kivikari, professor (emeritus), Turku School of Economics
- Henrik Lax, MEP 2004-2009
- Paula Lehtomäki, secretary general, Nordic Council of Ministers
- Maarit Lindström, director, chief economist, Finnish Forest Industries Federation
- Olli Pohjanvirta, chairman of the board of directors, Nurminen Logistics
- Aleksi Randell, director general, Confederation of Finnish Construction Industries
- Seppo Remes, professor of practice, Lappeenranta-Lahti University of Technology

== History ==
PEI started its operations based on a private initiative and fund-raising in the autumn of 1987. At first, the unit operated under the name the Institute for East-West Trade.

In its research and education, the Institute for East-West Trade focused on the socialist economies in Europe and the Soviet Union of the time. Since the establishment of the unit, Baltic Sea region economies were also included among its key subjects of research and education. The first lectures on the topic were held in the academic year 1986–1987, when the unit also launched its research activities.

Soon after the establishment of the Institute for East-West Trade, the European Institute was created. The merger of the two units began to seem sensible after the era of socialism was consigned to history in Europe. The Institute for East-West Trade and the European Institute merged into the Pan-European Institute at the end of the 1990s.

In 1987–2003, Professor Urpo Kivikari acted as the director of the unit. After Professor Kivikari retired, in autumn 2003 Professor Kari Liuhto was invited from Lappeenranta University of Technology to head the Pan-European Institute.

In 2015, the Pan-European Institute was awarded the Europe Award by the European Foundation (currently part of the Turku University Foundation).

The Pan-European Institute celebrated its 30th anniversary in 2017 by organising a seminar called “Russian enigma – Decoding mysteries and turning them into business opportunities”.

== Research ==
During more than three decades, PEI has conducted dozens of commissioned studies, funded by, for example, the European Union, the Prime Minister's Office, the Finnish ministries and the Academy of Finland. In addition to research, experts of the Pan-European Institute have been involved in the development of the economic systems of several former Soviet republics. As an example, Professor Kari Liuhto's participated in designing the Strategy 2020 for the Russian Government.

PEI has been engaged in close research cooperation with the Centrum Balticum Foundation since autumn 2011, when Professor Liuhto began as the foundation's part-time director.

In its research, the Pan-European Institute focuses on the following five themes:

- Economic and business development in the Baltic Sea region economies (focusing on the development of the maritime cluster)
- Economic relations between the EU and Russia
- Flow of foreign direct investments to and from Russia
- Socio-economic development in Europe and its neighbourhood
- Business development in the EU and in its eastern neighbouring countries.

In the following, some examples of PEI research projects:

- KAPPAS – Trade policy experts and know-how to Finland (2019–2022): The purpose of the project is to increase trade policy education in Finland, to organise business training related to the topic and to produce scientific research on the current state and future development of trade policy. The project is funded by the Confederation of Finnish Industry and Employers Foundation.
- ECOPRODIGI (2017–2020): The aim of the project was to increase eco-efficiency of the maritime industry in the Baltic Sea region with the solutions provided by digitalisation. This EU-funded cooperation project involved 21 partners from five different Baltic Sea countries. PEI acted as the main coordinator of the project.
- DigiPro (2016–2018): During the project, proactive project management solutions were developed for business use. The stakeholders in the project were Turku School of Economics, Lappeenranta University of Technology and four Finnish SMEs.
- MNEmerge (2014–2016): This EU-funded project explored the role of multinational enterprises (MNEs) in addressing global development challenges. The project included field research in Brazil, Ghana and India. The project studied such matters as what kind of socio-economic impacts the activities of multinational enterprises have in developing countries and how cooperation between companies and decision-makers could be strengthened to promote responsible business.
- Russia's final energy frontier – Sustainability challenges of the Russian Far North (2014–2016): The project examined how energy policy is shaped in Russian Far North through interaction between internal factors, international companies and international politics. The project also examined what kind of a role the socio-economic development of local communities and the environmental responsibility play in the policy. The project was implemented in cooperation with the University of Helsinki and a Japanese research group.
- SmartComp (2012–2013): The EU-funded project analysed the current situation of the maritime cluster in the Baltic Sea region and its prospects in Latvia, Finland and Estonia.
- The international dimension of the Russian innovation ecosystem (2011–2014): The main objective of the research project was to examine the use of international connections and networks and their impact on the Russian innovation system.
- Wider Europe – Regional Security Report (2010–2011): The Pan-European Institute followed the security developments in Eastern Central Europe, South Caucasus and Central Asia. The reports were part of the Security and Development Research within the Wider Europe Initiative Security Cluster, which was funded by the Ministry for Foreign Affairs in the framework of development cooperation.

== Teaching and education ==
The research carried out by PEI creates foundations for the teaching and education provided by the unit at Turku School of Economics. PEI offers three courses with lectures, which are part of the teaching on offer in the subject of international business:

- Business in the Baltic Sea Region: The course discusses the development of the Baltic Sea economic area and the business environment of the region. The lectures are given in English.
- Doing Business in Wider Europe: The course explores business in a Wider Europe, or Europe and its neighbourhood. The course is in English.
- Trade Policy and International Business: This course taught in Finnish deals with the transformation of trade policy and its impacts on business activities

== Activating discussion in the Baltic Sea region ==
Since 2004, PEI has been publishing a review focusing on the Baltic Sea region, called the “Baltic Rim Economies”. The distribution list covers tens of thousands of readers in over 80 countries. Some 3,000 experts have contributed articles to the magazine, including EU Commissioners (e.g. Jean-Claude Juncker, José Manuel Barroso), ministers, diplomats, mayors, businessmen, journalists and representatives of the world of research. The review can be subscribed free of charge. You can register on the review's distribution list on Baltic Rim Economies home page.
