= Trance (disambiguation) =

A trance is an altered state of consciousness.

Trance may also refer to:

== Film and television ==
- Trance, or Anita, a 1920 Austrian film directed by Luise Fleck
- Der Fan, a 1982 West German horror film also known as Trance
- Trance (1998 film), an American horror film by Michael Almereyda
- Trance (2013 film), a British thriller directed by Danny Boyle
- Trance (2020 film), an Indian Malayalam-language film
- "The Trance" (The Twilight Zone), an episode of The Twilight Zone
- Trance Gemini, a fictional character in the TV series Andromeda

== Literature ==
- Trance (character), a fictional character in the Marvel Comics universe
- Trance, a 2006 novel by Stanley Morgan
- Trance, a 2005 novel by Christopher Sorrentino
- Trance, a play by Shoji Kokami

== Music ==
- Trance music, a type of electronic dance music with several subgenres
- Trance (band), German heavy metal band

=== Albums ===
- Trance (Steve Kuhn album), 1975
- Trance (Hassan Hakmoun album), 1993
- Trance (EP), a 1998 EP by Virgin Black
- The Trance (album), a 1965 album by Booker Ervin
- Trance, a 1982 album by Chris & Cosey
- Trances, a 1983 album by Robert Rich

=== Songs ===
- "Trance" (song), a 2022 song by Metro Boomin, Travis Scott and Young Thug from the album Heroes & Villains
- "Trance", a 1997 song by Paul McCartney from the album Standing Stone
- "Trance (Make My Own Reality)", a 2008 song by Doug Wimbish from the album CinemaSonics
- "Trance (Walk It Down)", a 2026 song by Quavo from the album Qrömelife

== Other uses ==
- TRANCE (TNF-related activation-induced cytokine) or RANKL, a human protein
- Trance JIT, a MorphOS just-in-time compiler for running 68k applications
- Trance, a fictional attribute in the video game Final Fantasy IX

== See also ==
- Trans (disambiguation)
