= Transeuropa (theater festival) =

- Genre: Youth theatre
- Frequency: Every three years
- Locations: Hildesheim, Germany
- Inaugurated: 1994
- Website: www.transeuropa-festival.de

Transeuropa is a triennial theater festival in Germany organized in cooperation with the University of Hildesheim that brings together young performers from different countries to explore avant-garde theatre around a defined theme.

== Description ==
The Transeuropa festival has been held every three years since 1994. The Transeuropa organization was founded in 1993 to promote and maintain free and student theater at the European level. The festival is organized in cooperation with the University of Hildesheim and the Institute for Media and theater, and brings together young performers from the avant-garde theater scene of three or four European countries. The goal is to promote cultural and artistic cooperation through mutual understanding between people of different nationalities, ideologies and ways of life, and to detect new aesthetic and discursive developments in the independent theater scene. Transeuropa has become one of the largest of such festivals in Europe.

== History ==
In the 1990s, after the opening of borders in Europe, Transeuropa explored links between East and West through the young theater scene in the partner countries. Transeuropa continues to explore developments and promote discussions by young European artists within a thematic focus.

- 1994: Partner countries: Poland, Belgium and the Netherlands
- 1997: Partner countries: Czech Republic, Great Britain and the Netherlands
- 2000: Partner countries: Denmark, Russia and the UK. The festival was hosted at the World's Fair (Weltausstellung) building in Hanover.
- 2003: "Theater as training for reality", with theater from Norway, Estonia and Switzerland
- 2006: "New Collective", current trends of young European theater and performance art, with special focus on current productions from Switzerland, Slovenia, Croatia and Macedonia
- 2009: "Crossing borders" Young groups from Belgium, Germany, Serbia and Turkey
- 2012: The festival in Hildesheim invited guest performances from Iceland, Portugal and Lithuania
