= Trana (disambiguation) =

Trana is a comune in the Metropolitan City of Turin in the northern Italian region Piedmont.

Trana may also refer to:

- Gabriela Traña, a Costa Rican long-distance runner
- John Marius Trana, a Norwegian trade unionist and politician for the Labour Party
- Tom Trana, a Swedish motor rally driver
