= Transeuropa Compañía de Aviación =

Spanish charter airline

Trans-Europa
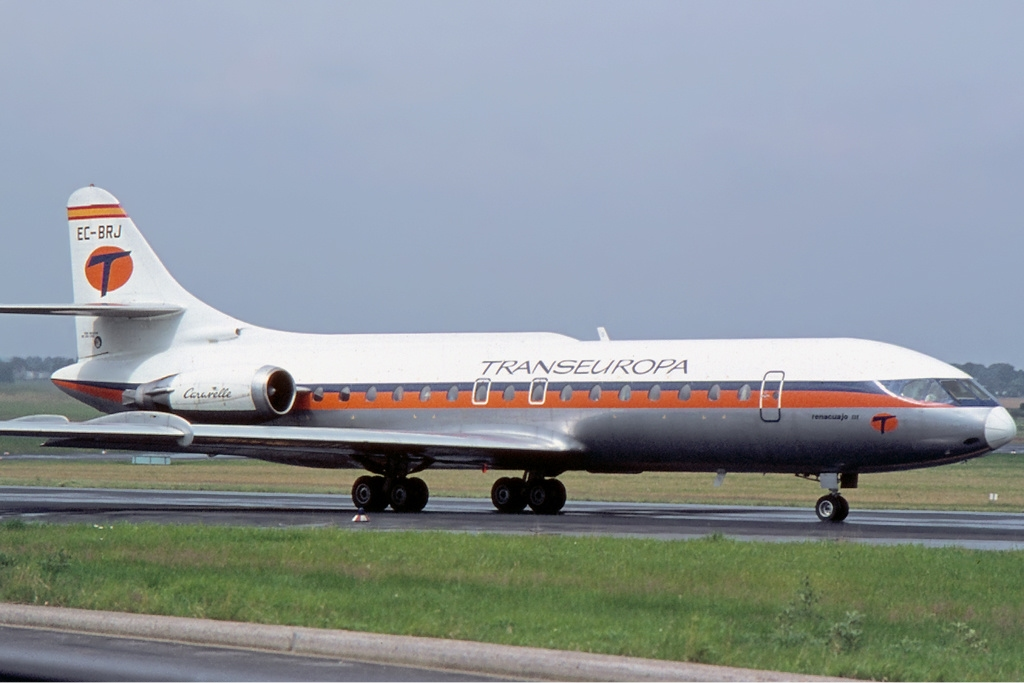
- Transeuropa Sud Aviation SE-210 Caravelle 10B1R at Düsseldorf International Airport
| IATA | ICAO | Call sign |
|---|---|---|
| TR | (none) | TRANSEUROPA |
- Founded: 1965
- Commenced operations: 1965
- Ceased operations: 1982
- Operating bases: Palma de Mallorca Airport
- Headquarters: Palma de Mallorca, Spain

Transeuropa was a charter airline from Spain that operated from 1965 until 1982.

== Company history ==
Trans-Europa Companía de Aviación SA was founded in July 1965 and began operations two months later using a single Douglas DC-7 for ad hoc charters, both passenger and freight, from its base at Palma de Mallorca. Later, it purchased DC-4s for freighter operations. It was during 1969 that the SE 210 Caravelle was introduced into the fleet.

An economic recession in 1979 led to a fall in charter demand and the airline was purchased by the Spanish government, through the Instituto Nacional de Industria (INI), the National Institute of Industry, and took delivery of six Fokker 27 for short haul operations on behalf of Iberia and Aviaco. By this time, with the increase in the price of aviation fuel and the Caravelle aircraft becoming obsolete there was a need to modernize the fleet. However, the fleet could not be modernized owing to lack of capital.

In the early 1980s, the company went bankrupt, mainly due to a pan-European recession. The company was acquired by the Aznar Shipping Group, and soon after by the Instituto Nacional de Industria, which redistributed 60% of Transeuropa's shares to Iberia, and 40% to Aviaco. Assets, including airplanes, went to Aviaco, except for four Caravelles that went to form the new airline Hispania. Transeuropa was dissolved on the 1st of February 1982.

== Destinations ==
Trans-Europa's Caravelles were used to fly tourists from different locations in Europe to Spain, mainly Palma de Mallorca. As tourism grew Transeuropa stopped its freight operations, most of which had been carried out on behalf of Iberia using its Caravelle 11R combi aircraft.

Transeuropa also served the Canary Islands, Morocco and Tunisia, mostly from Germany. In 1976, six Caravelle 10Rs were being operated.

== Fleet ==
- 4 - Douglas DC-4
- 1 - Douglas DC-7
- 3 - Douglas DC-7C Seven Seas
- 8 - SE 210 Caravelle both 10R and 11R.
- 6 - Fokker 27-600

== See also ==
- List of defunct airlines of Spain
