= Trans =

Trans- is a Latin prefix meaning "across", "beyond", or "on the other side of".

Used alone, trans may refer to:

== Arts, entertainment, and media ==
- Trans (festival), a former festival in Belfast, Northern Ireland, United Kingdom
- Trans (1982 film), a Venezuelan short documentary film
- Trans (1998 film), an American film
- Trans Corp, an Indonesian business unit of CT Corp in the fields of media, lifestyle, and entertainment
  - Trans Media, a media subsidiary of Trans Corp
    - Trans TV, an Indonesian television network
    - Trans7, an Indonesian television network

=== Literature ===
- Trans: Gender and Race in an Age of Unsettled Identities, a 2016 book by Rogers Brubaker
- Trans: When Ideology Meets Reality, a 2021 book by Helen Joyce

=== Music ===
- Trans (album), by Neil Young
- Trans (Stockhausen composition), a 1971 orchestral composition
- Trans (Saariaho composition), a 2015 harp concerto by Kaija Saariaho

== Places ==
- Trans, Mayenne, France, a commune
- Trans, Switzerland, a village

== Science and technology ==
- Cis-trans isomerism, in chemistry, a form of stereoisomerism
  - Trans fat, fats containing trans-isomer fatty acids
- Trans effect in inorganic chemistry, the increased lability of ligands that are trans to certain other ligands
- Trans-acting in molecular biology, an external factor which acts on a molecule
- Trans-lunar injection, propulsive maneuver of a spacecraft towards the Moon
- TRANS.COM, an 8080/Z80 to 8088/8086 computer code translator

== Sociology ==
- Trans, a sociological term which may refer to:
  - Transgender, people who identify themselves with a gender that differs from their sex designated at birth
  - Transsexual, people who seek to transition from their birth-assigned sex to another
  - Trans*, a broader term for identities including transgender and transsexual

== Other uses ==
- Transition House Association of Nova Scotia (TRANS), Canada
- FC Narva Trans, an Estonian football team
- SEAT Trans, a van variant of the SEAT Panda
- Trans Fishers, a pseudonym used by Japanese video game designer Hitoshi Akamatsu

== See also ==
- Trance (disambiguation)
- Tranz (disambiguation)
- Tran (disambiguation)
