= Air – Transport Europe =

Slovak airline

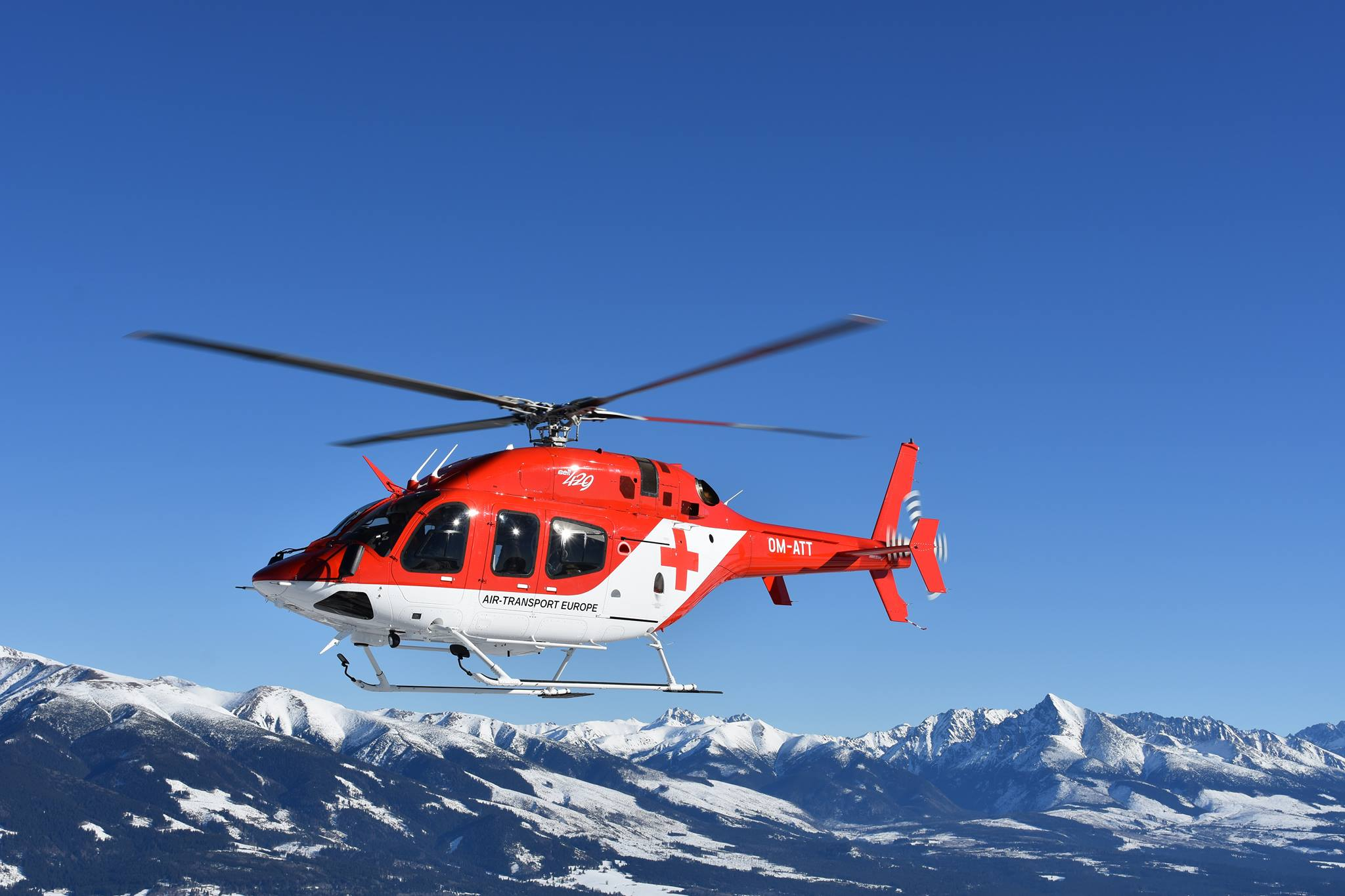
Bell 429 of ATE Slovakia in HEMS configuration

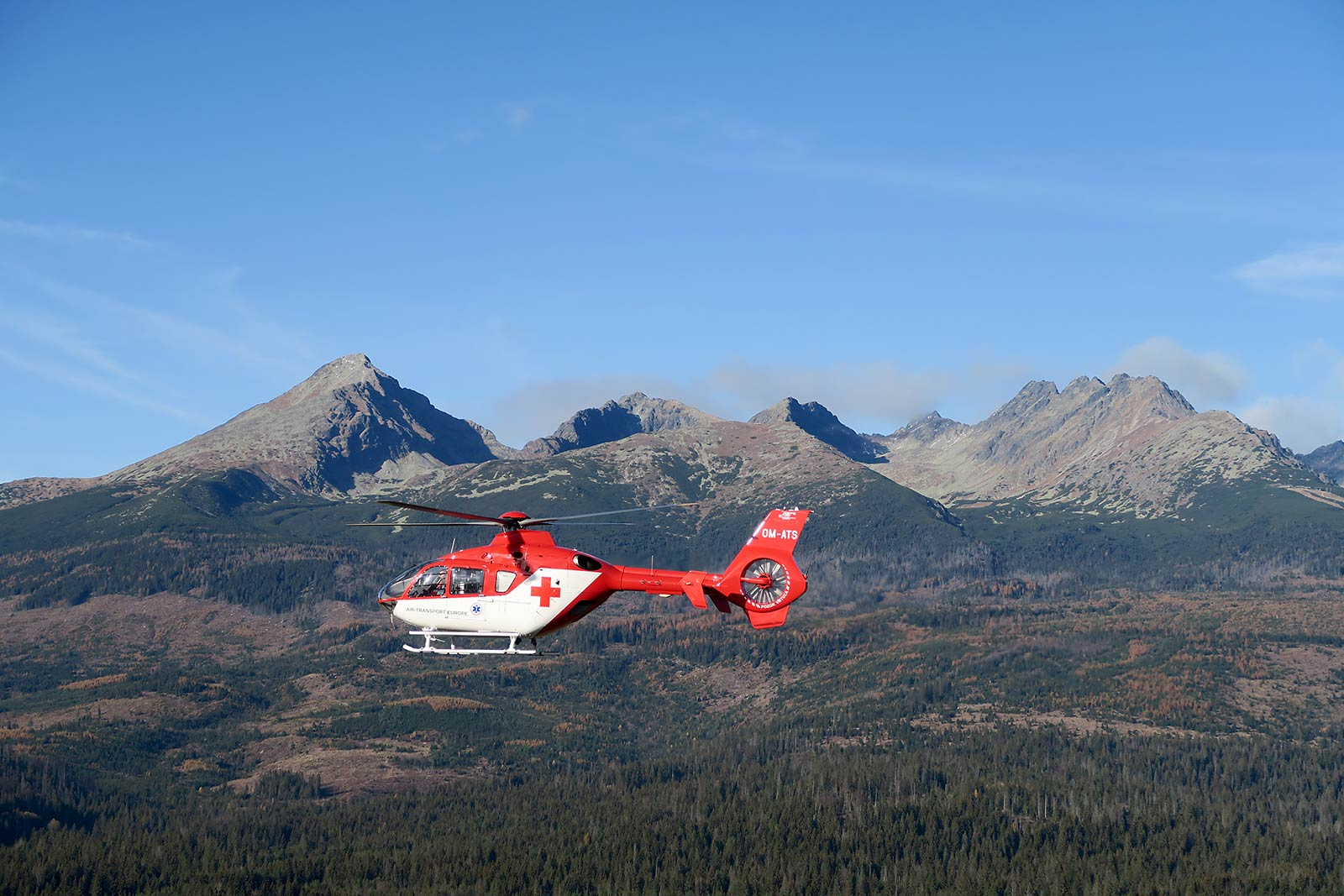
EC 135 of ATE Slovakia. Source: ATE

Air-Transport Europe spol. s r.o. is a specialist Slovak airline based in Poprad. Using a business jet and a helicopter fleet, it undertakes personal transport, helicopter emergency medical services (HEMS), aerial works and contract helicopter services. It is also an authorised service centre for AgustaWestland and MIL helicopters. Its main base is Poprad-Tatry International Airport (TAT), with other bases at Košice International Airport (KSC), M. R. Štefánik Airport (BTS) Bratislava, Banská Bystrica, Nitra, Trenčín and Žilina. ATE is provider of 7 HEMS bases in Slovakia and 2 HEMS bases in the Czech Republic.

== History ==
The airline was established in 1990 and started operations in 1991.

In 2011, Air-Transport Europe became a member of ICAR-CISA, the International Commission for Air Rescue.

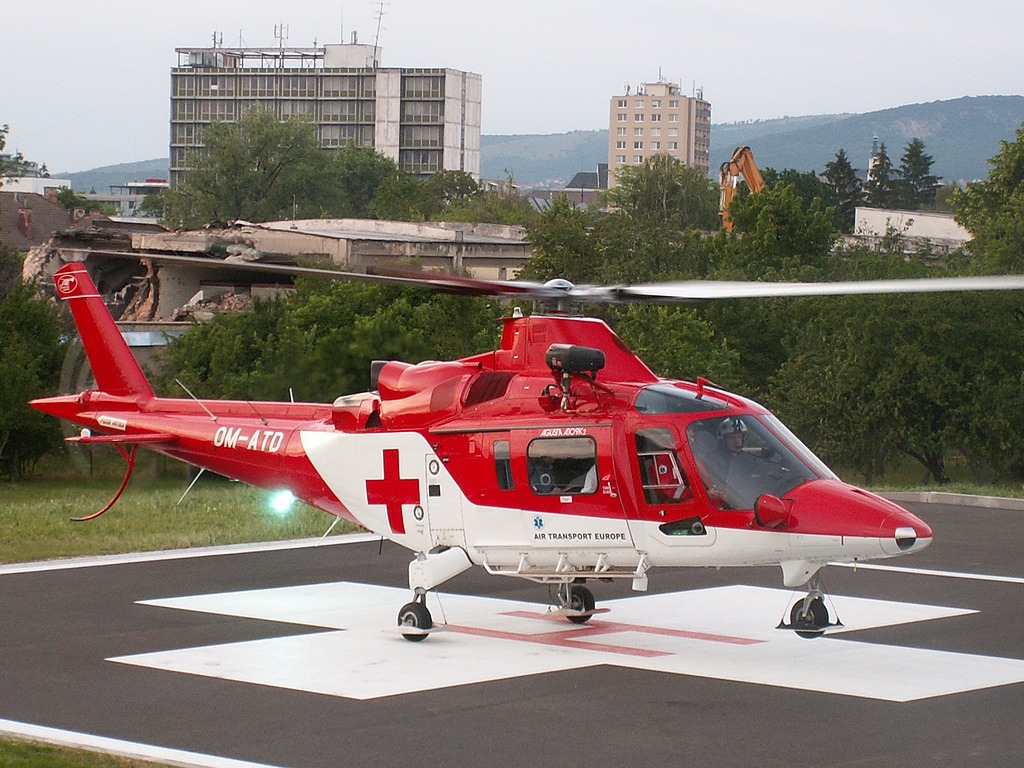
Agusta A109K2 of ATE Slovakia

== Fleet ==
The Air Transport Europe fleet consists of (as of July 2025):

- 5 Agusta A109K2 helicopters
- 5 Eurocopter EC135 helicopters
- 4 Bell 429 helicopters
- 1 Cessna 550 Encore business jet
