= Turku School of Economics =

Faculty of the University of Turku, Finland

Coordinates: 60°27′16.5″N 22°17′19″E

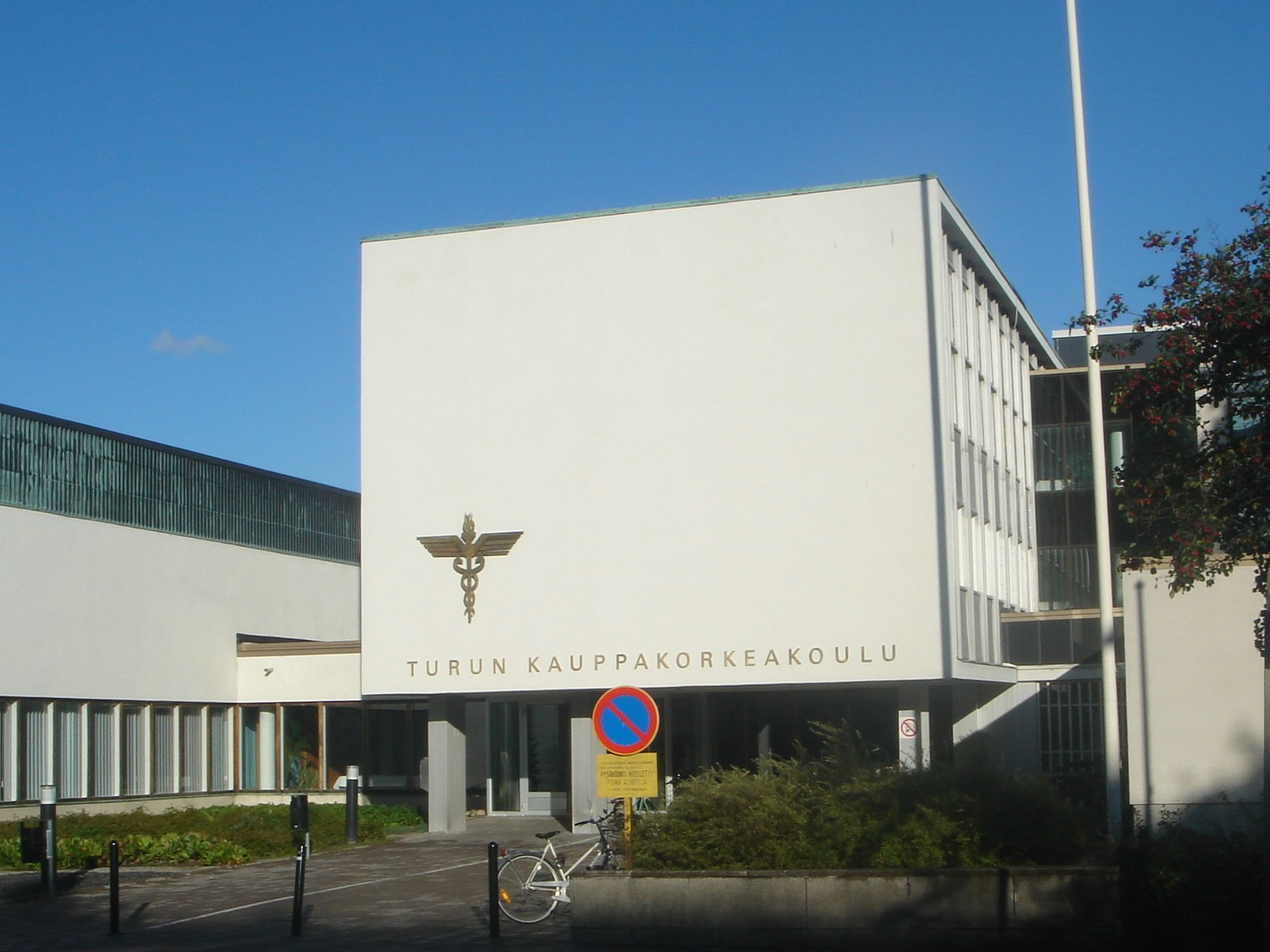
- Turku School of Economics
- Parent institution: University of Turku
- Established: 1950
- Dean: Markus Granlund
- Staff: 303 (2013)
- Budget: 22 010 000€
- Address: Rehtorinpellonkatu 3
- Location: Turku, Finland
- Interactive map of Turku School of Economics
- Website: Turku School of Economics

Turku School of Economics (Finnish Turun kauppakorkeakoulu) is a unit of the University of Turku located in Turku, Finland. It was established as an independent higher education business school in 1950, until it was acquired by the state in 1977. It was the second largest school of its kind in Finland, with approximately 2,000 graduate and 250 postgraduate students and a staff of 350. In January 2010, Turku School of Economics became the seventh faculty of the University of Turku. Its former rector, Professor Tapio Reponen, is now a vice rector of the University of Turku.

In addition to teaching a wide variety of economic and business related subjects, the faculty conducts research on matters relating to its field, and offers consulting services to businesses. Teaching is mainly carried out in Finnish, but there are also a number of courses available in English.

As a higher education institution, Turku School of Economics had been one of the most efficient universities in terms of master's per professor.

== Organisation of Turku School of Economics ==
Main departments

- Department of Management
  - Management and Organization
  - Entrepreneurship
- Department of Accounting and Finance
  - Accounting and Finance
  - Business Law
  - Quantitative Methods in Economics
- Department of Marketing and International Business
  - Marketing
  - International Business
  - Economic Geography
  - Information Systems Science
  - Economic Sociology
  - Supply Chain Management
- Department of Economics
  - Economics

Auxiliary units

- Business Research and Development Centre
  - Small Business Institute
  - Pan-European Institute
  - Innomarket
  - Institute for Executive Education
  - Media Group
  - Institute for Competition Policy Studies
  - Centre for Responsible Business
- Finland Futures Research centre
- Pori Unit
- Turku Centre for Computer Science (TUCS)

At the Turku School of Economics, you can study two international master's degree programmes in English

- Global Innovation Management
- Futures Studies
