= Trans Europe Halles =

Europe-based network of cultural centres

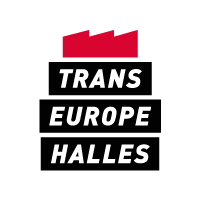
- Formation: 1983; 43 years ago
- Type: NGO
- Headquarters: Lund, Sweden
- Members: 162 members and associates
- President of the Executive Committee: Frido Hinde
- Managing Director: Tiffany Fukuma
- Website: www.teh.net

Trans Europe Halles (TEH) is an international network of community-led, grassroots cultural centers established in repurposed buildings.

== History ==
In 1983, the independent cultural centre "Halles de Schaerbeek/Hallen van Schaarbeek" organized a weekend of discussions in Brussels to enable European independent cultural centres to exchange experiences and participate in events under the theme: "Adventures of the rediscovered ark". This three-day forum focused on an alternative culture emerging in rehabilitated industrial buildings, and asserting its identity despite the reservations of political authorities.

The seven independent cultural centers that participated in this 1983 meeting and co-founded Trans Europe Halles (TEH) are: Halles de Schaerbeek in Brussels, Huset KBH in Copenhagen, Kulturfabrik in Koblenz, Melkweg in Amsterdam, Ny Scen in Gothenburg, Usine de Pali-Kao in Paris and the Rote Fabrik in Zurich. The list of members has since gradually expanded to include other multidisciplinary venues (film, video, theater, visual arts, music), such as Le Confort Moderne or Le Plus Petit Cirque du Monde in France. They put forward often upcoming artists, as well as stars and cult films. They organize music festivals or rave parties, urban art workshops, exchanges and gatherings on social themes, etc.

That 1983 meeting sowed the seed of what nowadays is Trans Europe Halles (TEH): a European-based, international network of community-led, grassroots cultural centers established in repurposed buildings, currently gathering 162 members and associated organizations in over 40 countries.

TEH members are cultural centers which emerged from civil society initiatives to repurpose industrial or commercial buildings for artistic, community and cultural uses. Besides this, they are very diverse in terms of geographical location, size, inspirational backgrounds, funding models, artistic programs, etc.

== Organization and structure ==
=== Members ===
Trans Europe Halles currently gathers 100 full members and 62 associate members in more than 40 countries. Trans Europe Halles centers are all established in repurposed buildings: industrial heritage buildings such as former factories, warehouses, but also military, commercial, corporate or religious buildings. Trans Europe Halles centers are mostly multidisciplinary arts centers.

To become a TEH Full Member, applicant cultural centers must fulfill the following membership criteria:

1. be a non-governmental organization or private enterprise operating in a repurposed space/building
2. be a center/organization with a legal entity structure.
3. be at least two years old
4. be a community-led independent international grassroots center/organization arising from a citizen's initiative.
5. have an autonomous, multidisciplinary social and cultural programming.
6. support and advocate for a democratic and pluralistic society.
7. show a strong commitment to equity, sustainability, diversity and equal opportunities.
8. show a strong motivation and willingness to engage in the network's activities.
9. be from any of these eligible 46 countries – https://coe.int

Organizations within and outside Europe who do not fulfill Full membership criteria have the possibility to apply as associate members, if they share Trans Europe Halles values and are interested in the network's activities. Associate members of Trans Europe Halles are typically:

1. Non-European grassroots cultural organisations
2. National networks
3. Cultural businesses, social enterprises and cooperatives
4. Government-run institutions (State cultural institutions and agencies, private-public institutions, regions and cities, etc.)
5. Sustainable urban development agencies
6. NGOs, associations, civil society groups
7. Universities and research institutes
8. Independent media
9. Architecture, Construction or energy specialists
10. Heritage specialists
11. Hacker spaces
12. Advocacy groups

=== Governance and management ===
TEH is run in a decentralised way: full members participate in decision-making during the network meetings. Each center with full membership status has one vote regardless of its size or economic status. The Executive Committee, is the governing and policy making body of the network, and is composed of Trans Europe Halles' full members representatives, elected by the General Assembly for two years. Trans Europe Halles' Executive Committee consists of a minimum of five and a maximum of eight people. A member of Trans Europe Halles can serve a maximum of 6 years (3 mandates) in the Executive Committee.

The members of Trans Europe Halles meet twice a year during TEH Meetings. Each meeting is hosted by a Full Member of the network, and co-organised with the Coordination Office.

The Spring Conference is a public event gathering 300 to 400 international grassroots cultural centers managers, urbanists, architects, artists, researchers, policymakers, etc. every year. It is the largest event of its kind, providing networking and peer-learning opportunities, and addressing timely topics for the sector through panels, roundtables, workshops, artistic performances, exhibitions, walks and visits. A formal General Assembly is held during the Spring Conference every year: members are invited to vote on the strategic orientations of the network.

The Fall Camp Meeting is dedicated to Trans Europe Halles members and hubs. It gathers 150 to 300 international grassroots cultural centers managers every year and focuses on strategic thinking, networking, knowledge exchange, project planning and cooperation activities.

The Trans Europe Halles Coordination Office is located in Lund, Sweden. With broad expertise, it is composed of a team of 15 international multicultural and multi-lingual experts and staff. The Trans Europe Halles Coordination Office offers a platform of services, shared tools and resources for the network. The Coordination Office is responsible for developing connections and networking opportunities, learning and resource sharing, communication and promotion, emergency mobilization and support endorsement for the members of the network. It also supports the sector through advocacy campaigns and participation in networks and expert groups, and policy recommendations. The Coordination Office offers consultancy services, project management, fundraises for the activities of the network and has become a focal point of expertise for the members.

== Activities ==
=== Meetings ===
Organized twice a year and hosted by a different member center each time, the TEH meetings are a networking platform for peers, a source of inspiration and a birthplace for new collaborations.

The activities and programs have a strong focus on capacity building, peer-learning. During three days, participants are invited to take part in workshops, seminars, lectures, and networking sessions. On the last day of each meeting, an outing is organized for the participants to get to know more about the local culture.

=== Projects ===
The network coordinates or partners on several multilateral cooperation projects:

- 2024–2025 The Good Enough Transformation
- 2024–2025 AlterPlaces
- 2023–2025 Balkans Hub
- 2023–2025 ZMINA! Rebuilding
- 2022–2026 The Cultural Transformation Movement Project
- 2022–2024 Rebuilding to Last
- 2022–2024 The Network Project
- 2022–2023 Culture for Health
- 2022–2023 Re-Source Ukraine!
- 2021–2022 SOIL
- 2020–2023 European Urban Regenerators Knowledge Alliance
- 2020–2023 Spaces of Transformation in Arts Education
- 2019–2022 Designing Inclusive and Sustainable Creative Economies
- 2018–2021 Cultural and Creative Spaces and Cities
- 2018–2021 Factories of Imagination
- 2015–2019 Creative Lenses: Business Models For Culture
- 2015–2017 Europe Grand Central
- 2014–2015 Independent Cultural Centres In South America
- 2015–2019 Engine Room Europe (ERE)
- 2013–2015 Green Art Lab Alliance (GALA)
- 2013–2014 TEH Mentorship Programme
- 2011–2014 Engine Room Europe

== Publications and Resources ==
Trans Europe Halles also publishes reports, handbooks and other types of media.

- Spaces of Transformation in Arts Education, 2023.
- TEH Diversity and Inclusion Handbook, 2021.
- Smart and Fearless - guidelines for emerging arts centres in eastern southeastern and southern Europe, 2021.
- Design Handbook for Cultural Centres, 2014.
- CSOS Creative Strategies of Sustainability for Cultural Operators, 2014.
- Leaders Stories, 2014.
- New Times, New Models. Investigating the internal governance models and external relations of independent cultural centres in times of change, 2010.
- Changing Room. Mobility of Non-Artistic Cultural Professionals in Europe, 2010.
- The Lift. Sharing experiences of a youth exchange network project, 2009.
- Managing Independent Cultural Centres. A Reference Manual, 2008.
- Factories of Imagination, 2001.
- Les Fabriques - lieux imprévus, 2001.
