= SEAT Marbella =

SEAT Panda SEAT Marbella
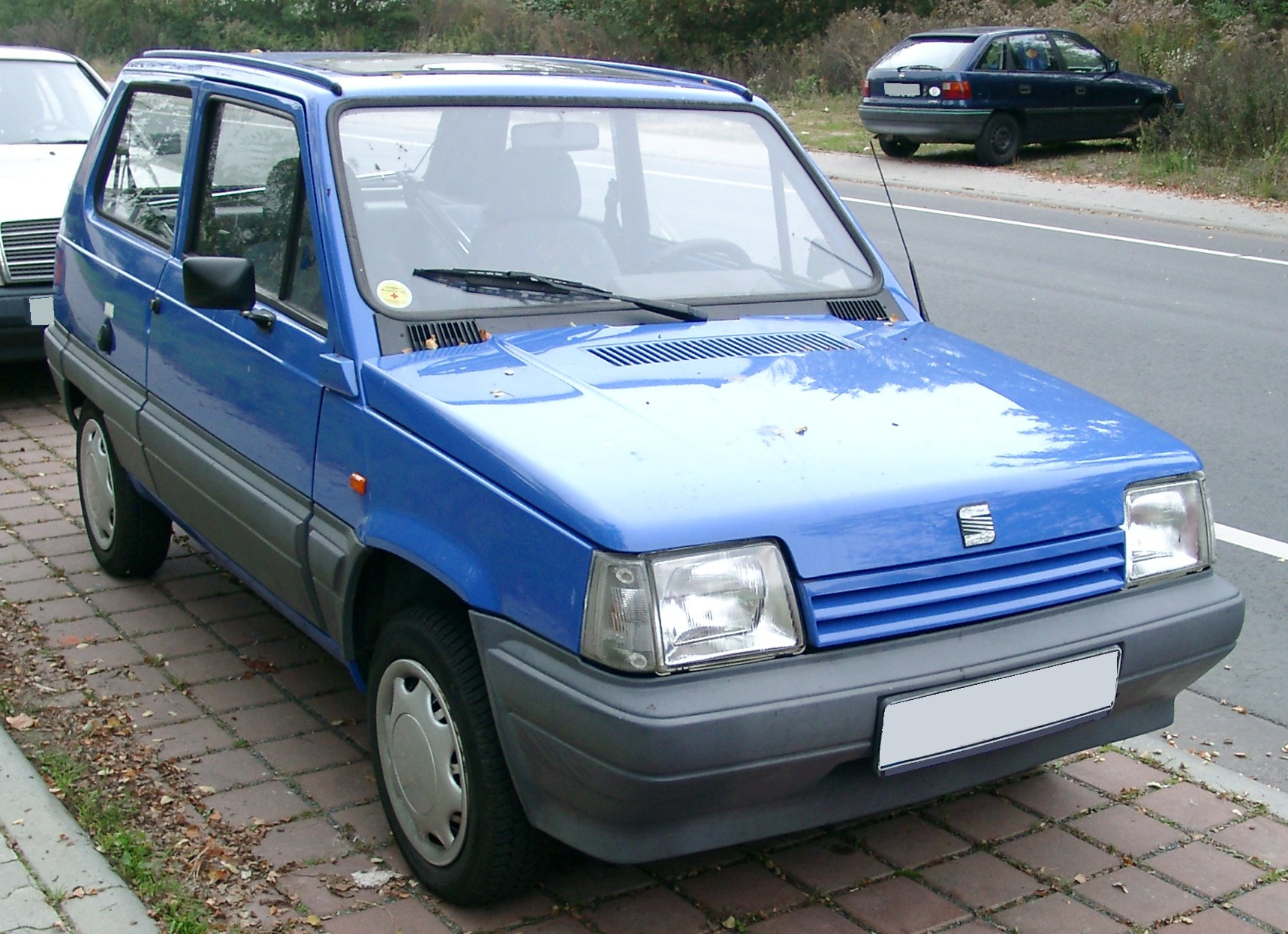
- SEAT Marbella

Overview
- Manufacturer: SEAT
- Also called: SEAT Panda
- Production: 1980–1986 (Panda); 1986–1998 (Marbella)
- Assembly: Spain: Pamplona (until 1983); Spain: Barcelona

Body and chassis
- Class: City car (A)
- Body style: 3-door hatchback
- Related: Fiat Panda

Powertrain
- Engine: Petrol: 843 cc Tipo 100 OHV I4; 899/903 cc Tipo 100 OHV I4

Dimensions
- Wheelbase: 2,160 mm (85.0 in)
- Length: 3,475 mm (136.8 in)
- Width: 1,510 mm (59.4 in)
- Height: 1,400 mm (55.1 in)

Chronology
- Predecessor: SEAT 133
- Successor: SEAT Arosa; SEAT Inca (For SEAT Terra)

The SEAT Marbella (codenamed 141A) was a badge-engineered Fiat Panda produced by SEAT from 1980 to 1986 (initially called the SEAT Panda), in the company's Landaben plant in the Spanish city of Pamplona (from February 1980 until 29 April 1983, when its production ended in that plant) and also in the Zona Franca plant in Barcelona. After the break in the partnership between SEAT and Fiat, the former's model was restyled and renamed SEAT Marbella. The Marbella was the last SEAT car ever made based on a FIAT model.

== History ==
The Panda entered production in Spain in 1980. It received a slight restyling in 1983, with a new grille and other minor differences. The "Marbella" badge was first used for the 1983 model year, on a luxurious version of the SEAT Panda.

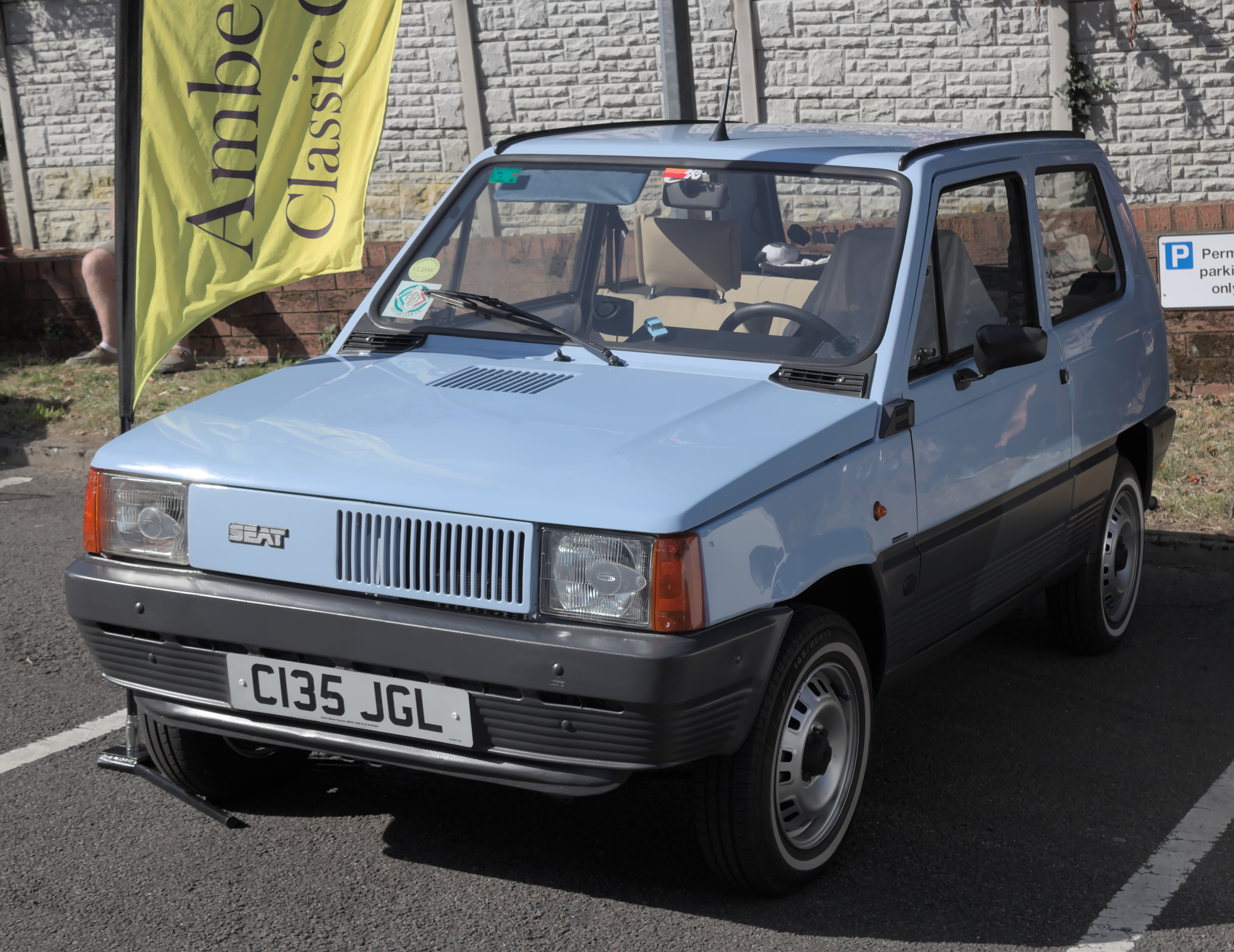
SEAT Panda (pre-facelift)

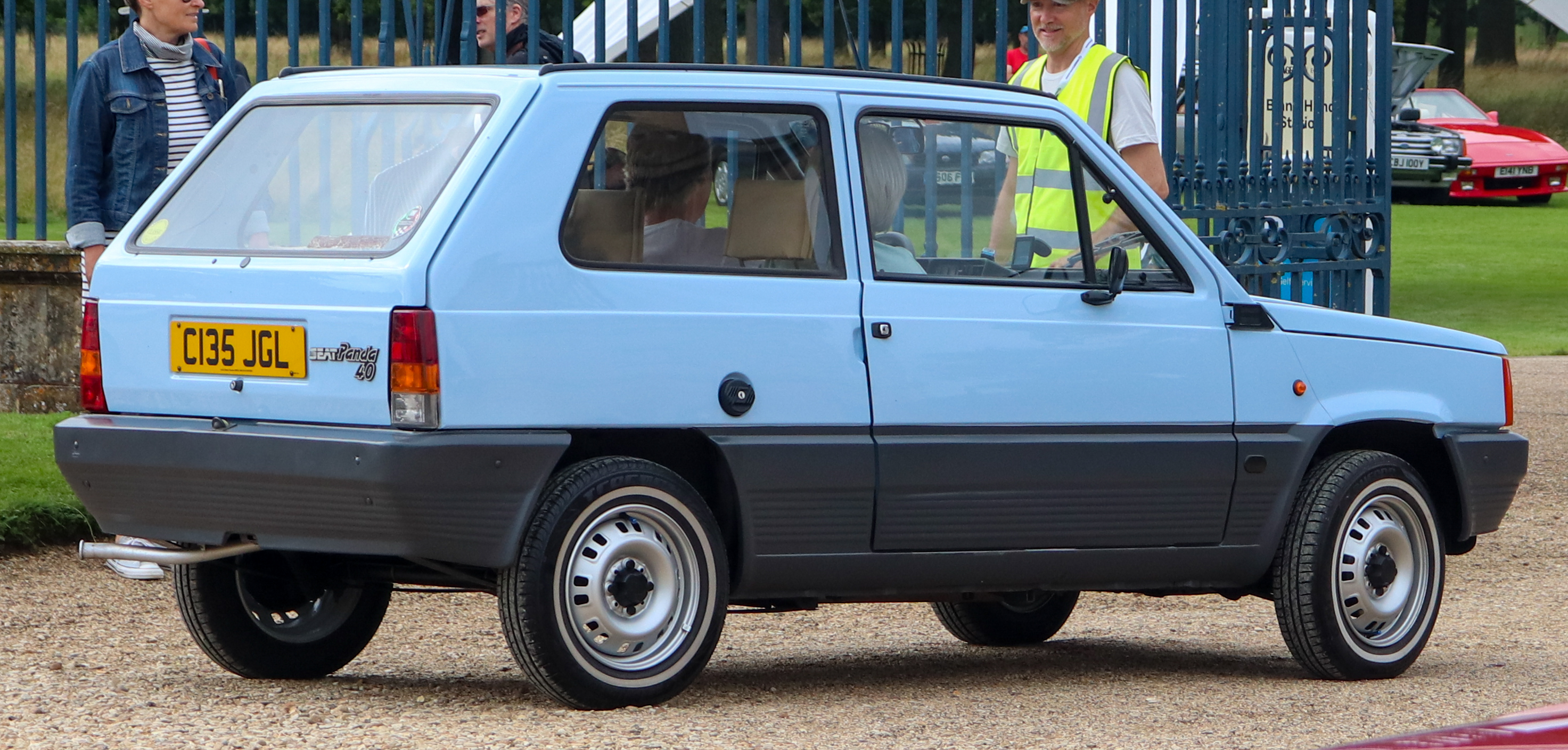
Rear view (pre-facelift)

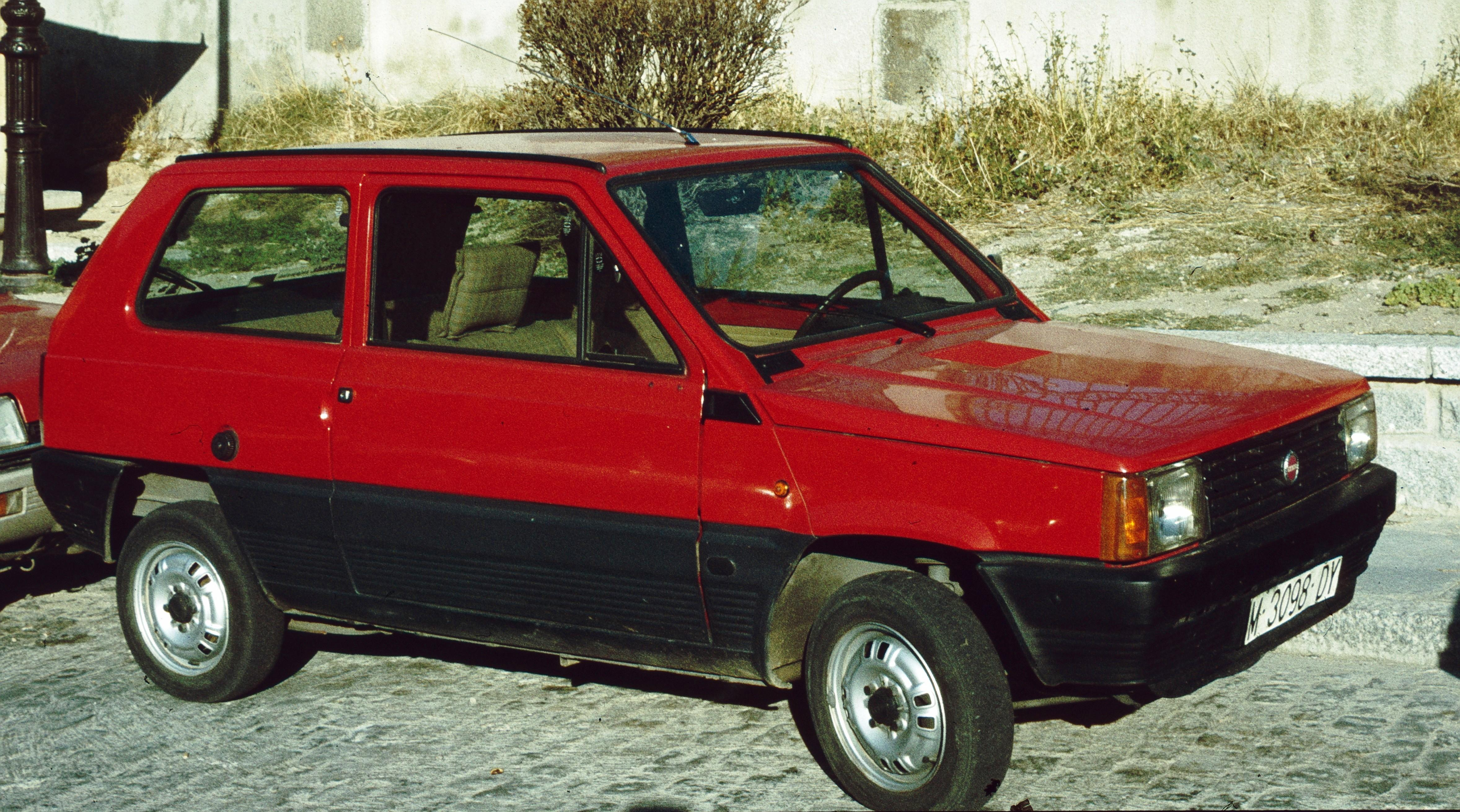
SEAT Panda Marbella (facelift)

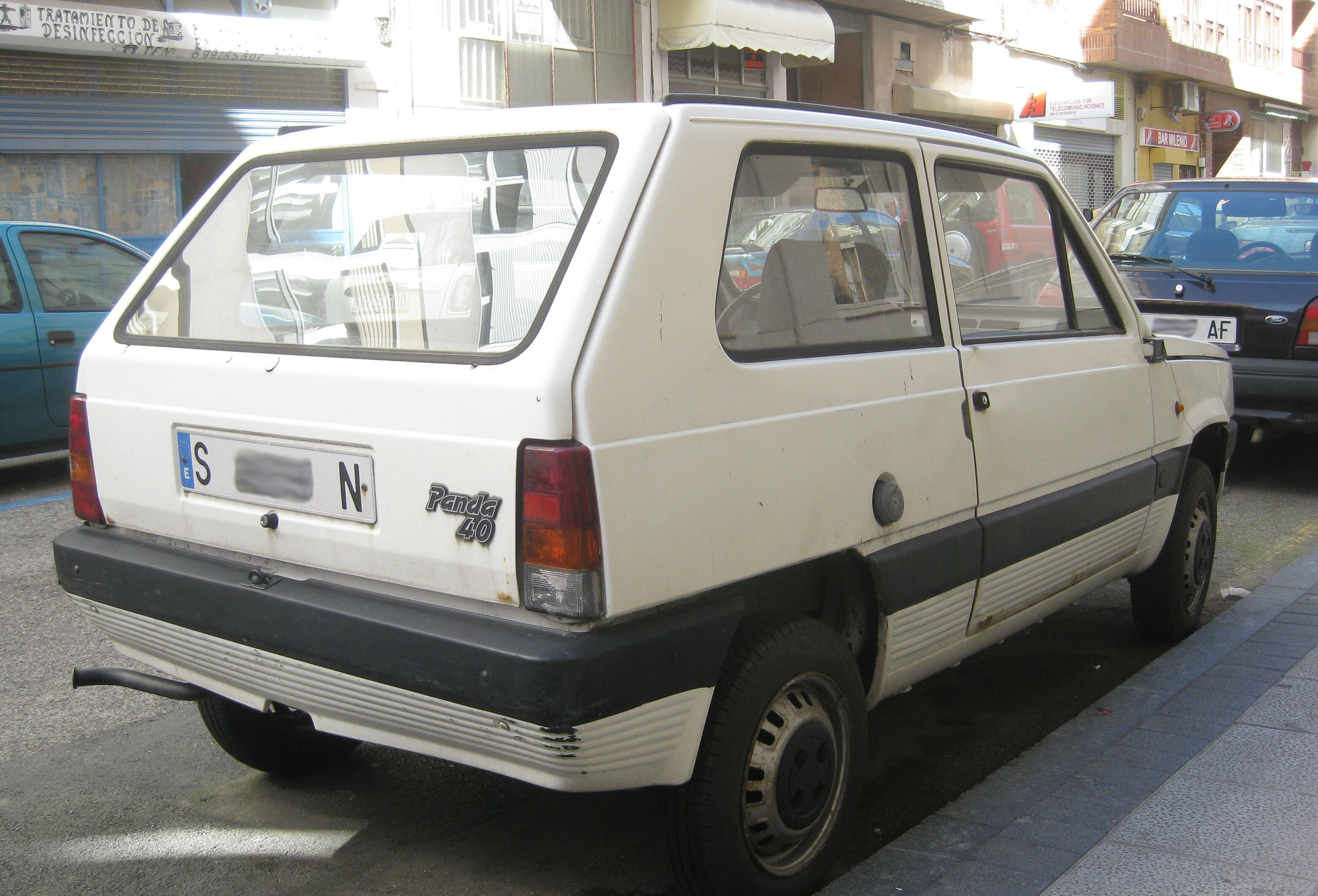
Rear view (facelift)

After a second, more thorough restyling in December 1986, it received the SEAT Marbella nameplate (codenamed 28 for SEAT Marbella and 028A for SEAT Marbella box) and was produced by SEAT until 1998 in the company's Zona Franca plant in Spain. The end of Marbella production in 1998 also meant the end of vehicle production in that factory. The SEAT model did not receive the mechanical and cosmetic tweaks (such as the removal of the front window quarter-lights) applied to the Fiat Panda in 1986, but was instead subjected to minor changes developed by SEAT in-house.

=== Differences ===
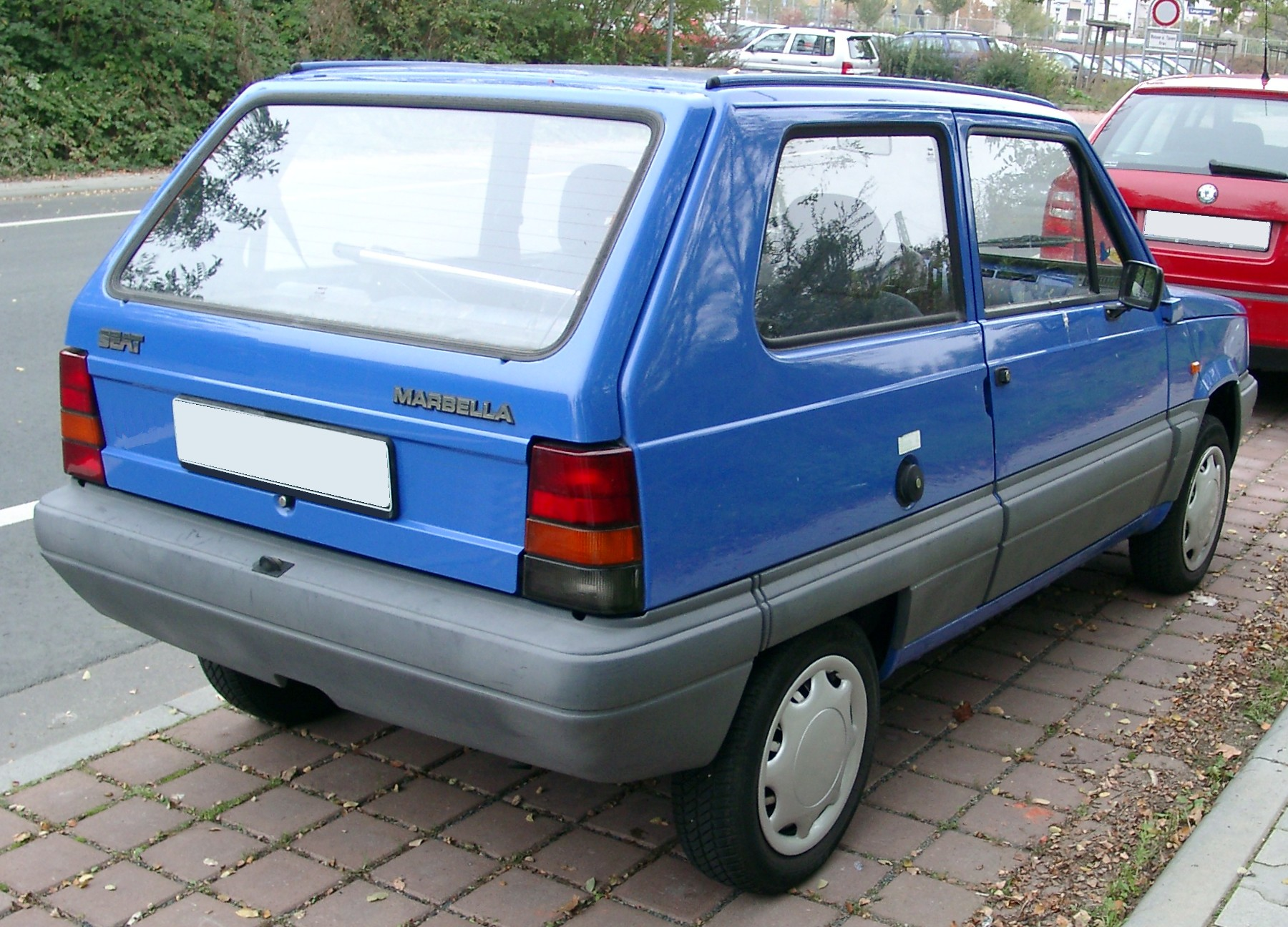
SEAT Marbella (rear view)

The obvious differences between a Panda and a Marbella are at the front and back of the car where head and tail lights and boot panels are different, the Marbella gaining a pronounced slope to the front panel.

The Marbella featured a boot with capacity of 272 litres, expandable to 1,088 litres when the rear seats are folded.

== Powertrain ==
Mechanically, the Panda borrowed heavily from the Fiat "parts bin", using engines and transmissions from the Fiat 127. The engine is an inline four-cylinder with 40 PS (29 kW) and 903 cc. This proved adequate for this light car which weighed in at about 680 kg. A 60 PS (44 kW) kit to make a more powerful SEAT Panda Abarth version was also on offer, sold in Spain by a company called Apicsa. Shortly after introduction, a smaller-hearted version corresponding to the Italian two-cylinder model was added. Called the "Panda 35", it had a smaller 843 cc version of the engine, a development of the engine originally fitted to the SEAT 850 beginning in the mid-sixties. To set it further apart from the "45", a lower compression rate was chosen. Nonetheless, the smaller engine had to work that much harder to keep up, and in practice the fuel economy savings were negligible.

When the Marbella was introduced in December 1986, the smaller 843 cc version continued to be available. This low-priced version produced only 34 PS (25 kW) at 5,600 rpm and was not available with the five-speed transmission. Top speed for the bigger engine was 131 km/h (81 mph), while the 850 could only reach 125 km/h (78 mph). 903 cc version of the engine later got electronic injection and reduced its size to 899 cc.

=== Equipment levels ===
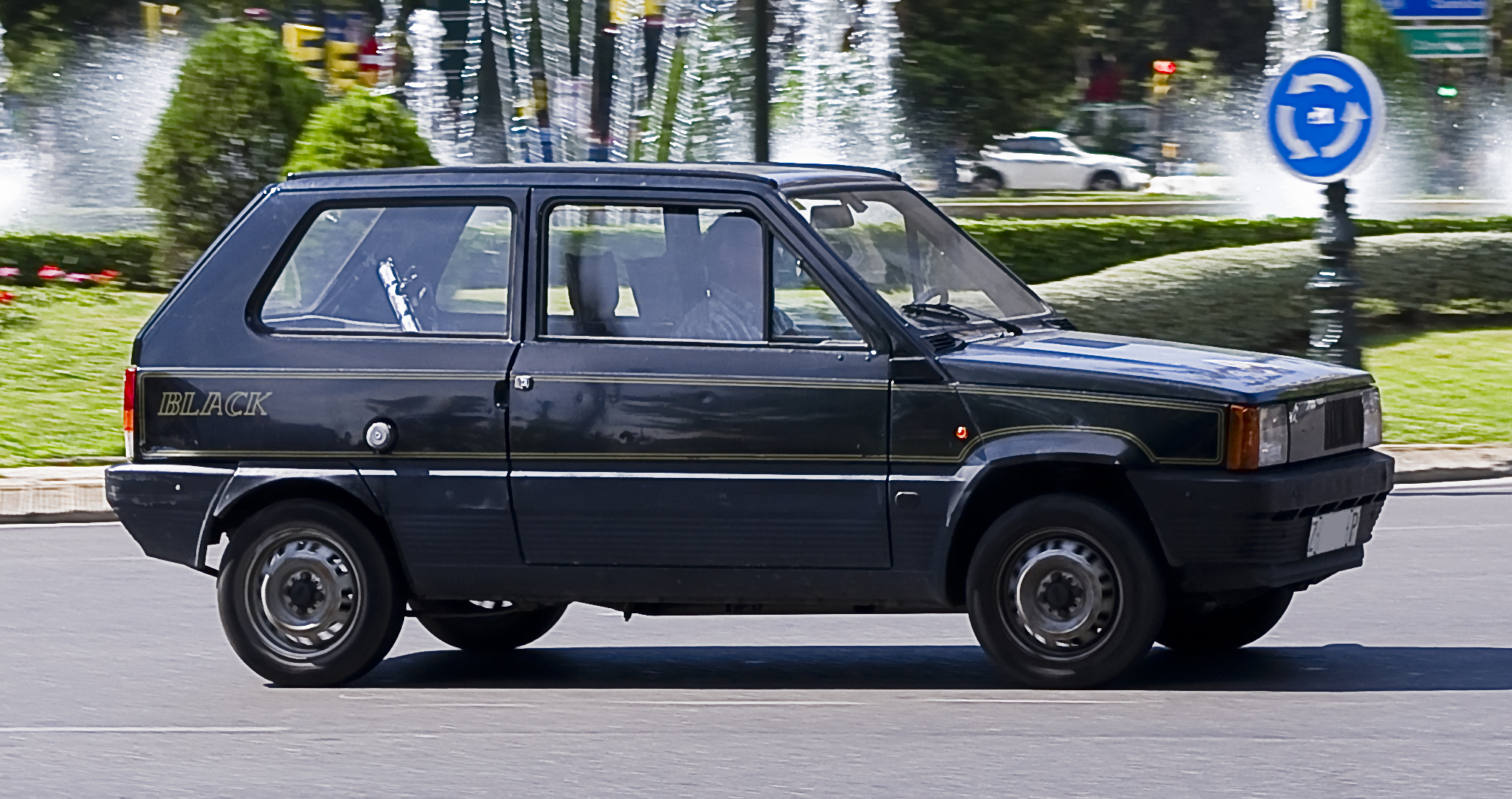
SEAT Panda 40 Black edition

Several differently labeled models were produced during the lifetime of the car, with few corresponding significant changes in specifications. Common models include the L, Special, XL, GL, and GLX, but there were many "special editions", especially later in the life of the Marbella. In September 1989 the "Black", "Red", and "Yellow" specials were added, "Blue", "Green", "CLX", and "Jeans" joined in September 1990. Various export markets also received market specific editions, such as the "Le Jouet" series marketed in France in the early nineties.

== Derivatives ==
=== Commercial version ===
==== SEAT Trans ====
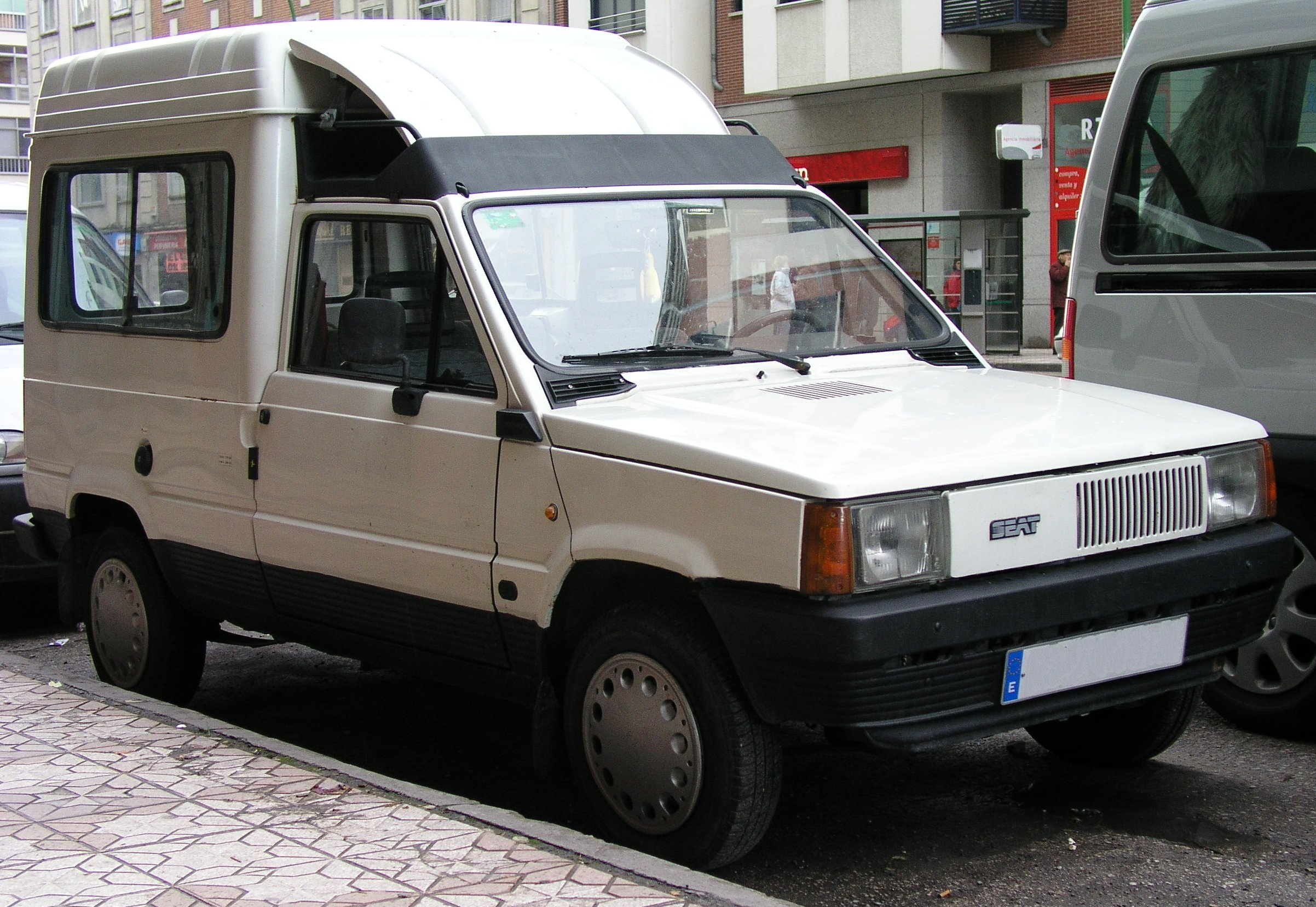
SEAT Trans

A small, high-roofed box van based on the Marbella's predecessor (the SEAT Panda) was available until 1986. In much the same configuration as the later Terra, it was called the SEAT Trans.

==== SEAT Terra (24/024A, 1987–1996) ====
A van version of the Marbella, called the SEAT Terra (codenamed 24 for SEAT Terra and 024A for the SEAT Terra box van), replaced the Trans. The Terra was produced in Spain from 1987 to 1996 when this model was meant to be replaced by its successor, the SEAT Inca. The SEAT Terra shared the underpinnings and front of the Marbella, but the back was replaced by a large, high metal box; there was also a load rack above the cab roof. It was very popular in Spain, and was also available in export markets. Somewhat confusingly, an earlier, open-topped fun-car version of the Panda had been sold as the SEAT Panda Terra earlier; another variant on the same theme was the Emelba Pandita.

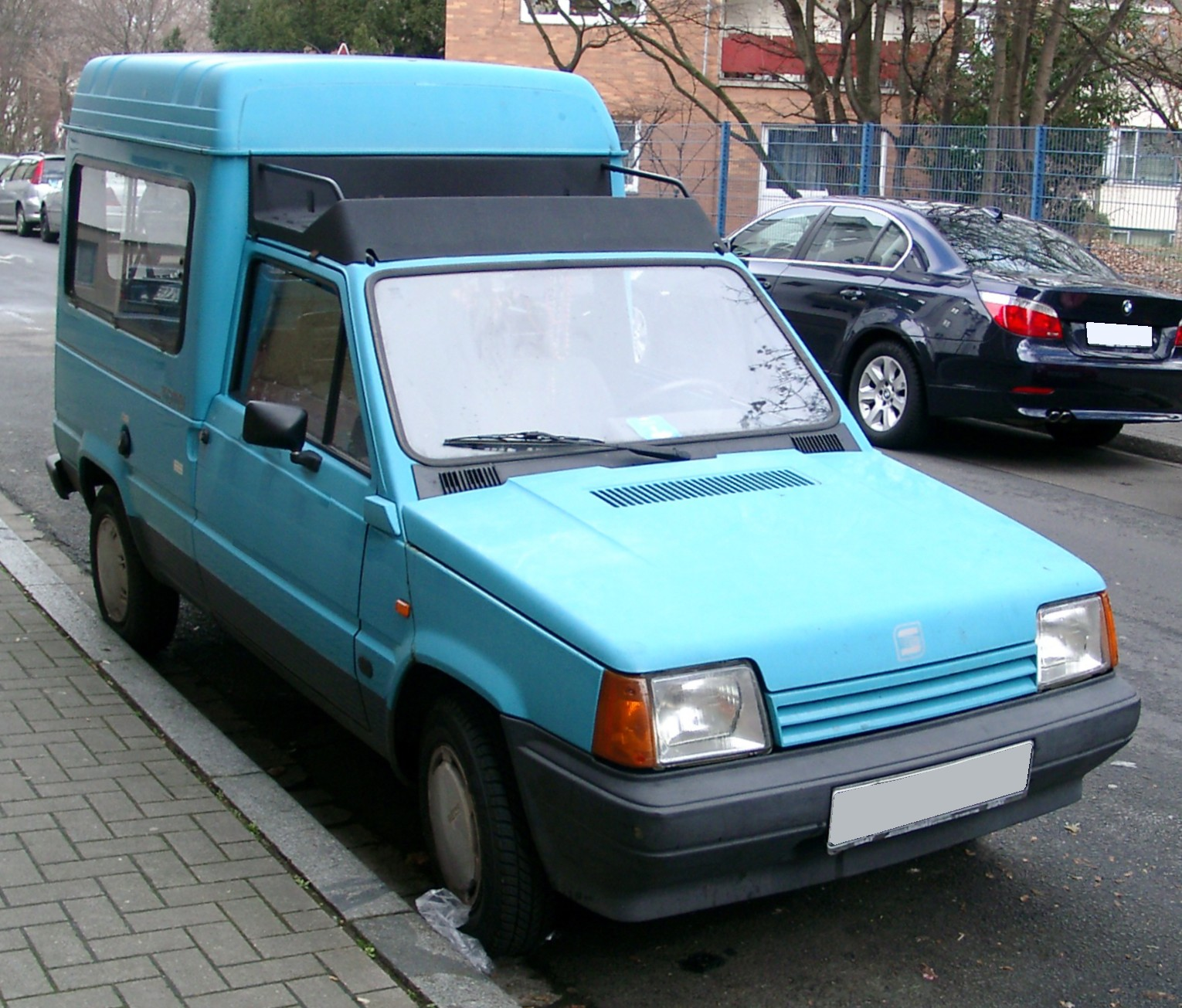
SEAT Terra, front view

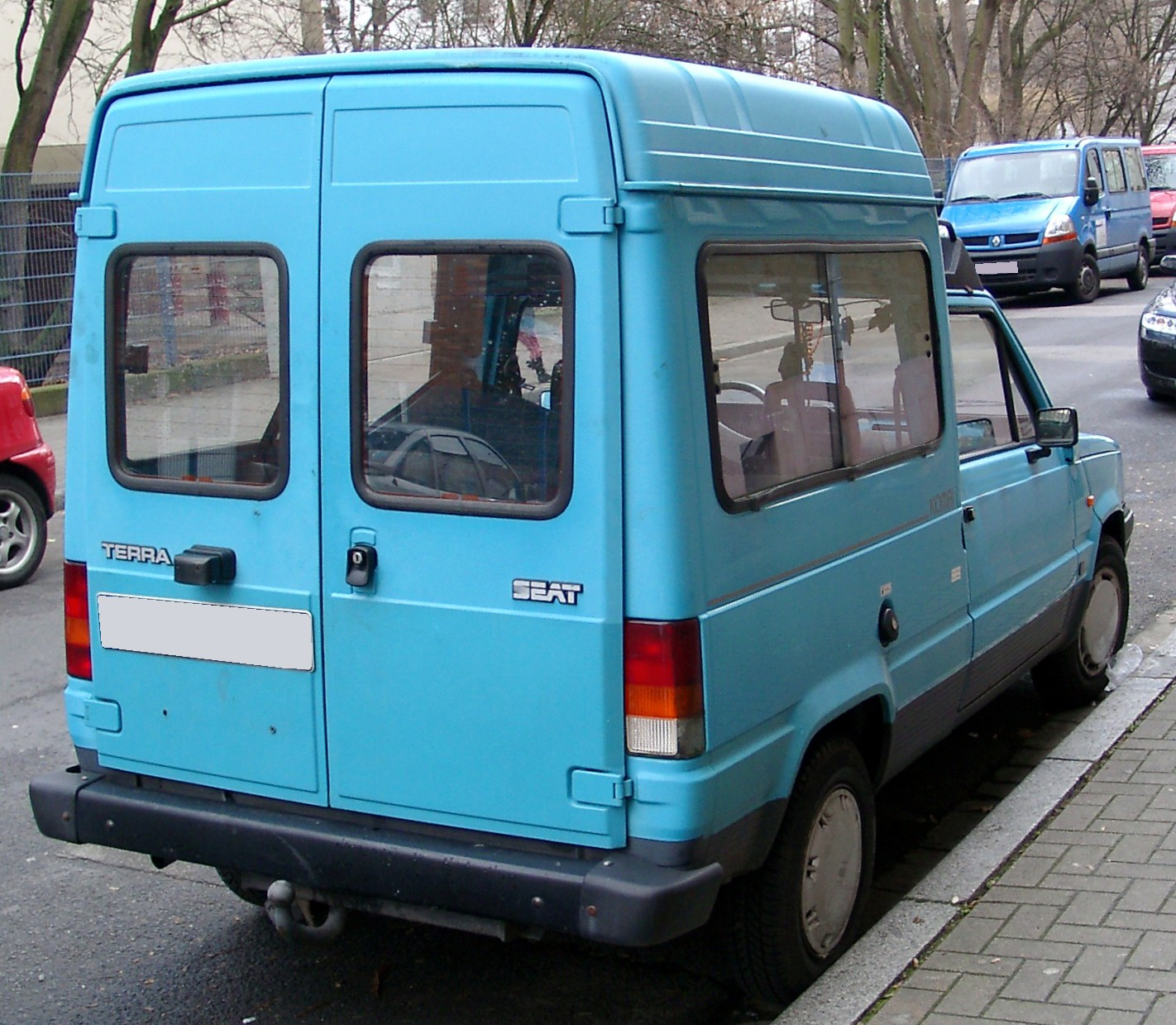
SEAT Terra, rear view

=== Popemobile ===
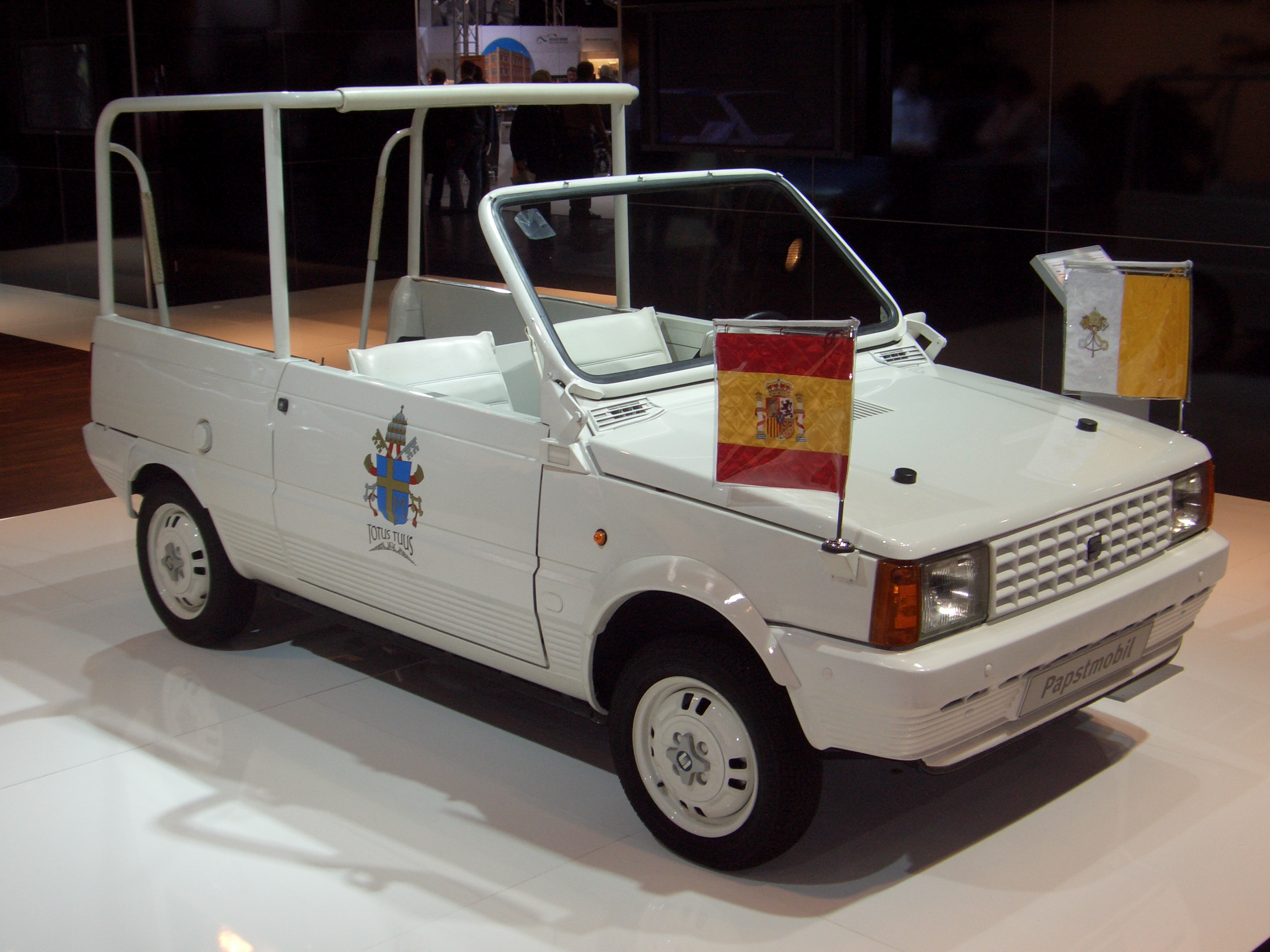
SEAT Panda Popemobile

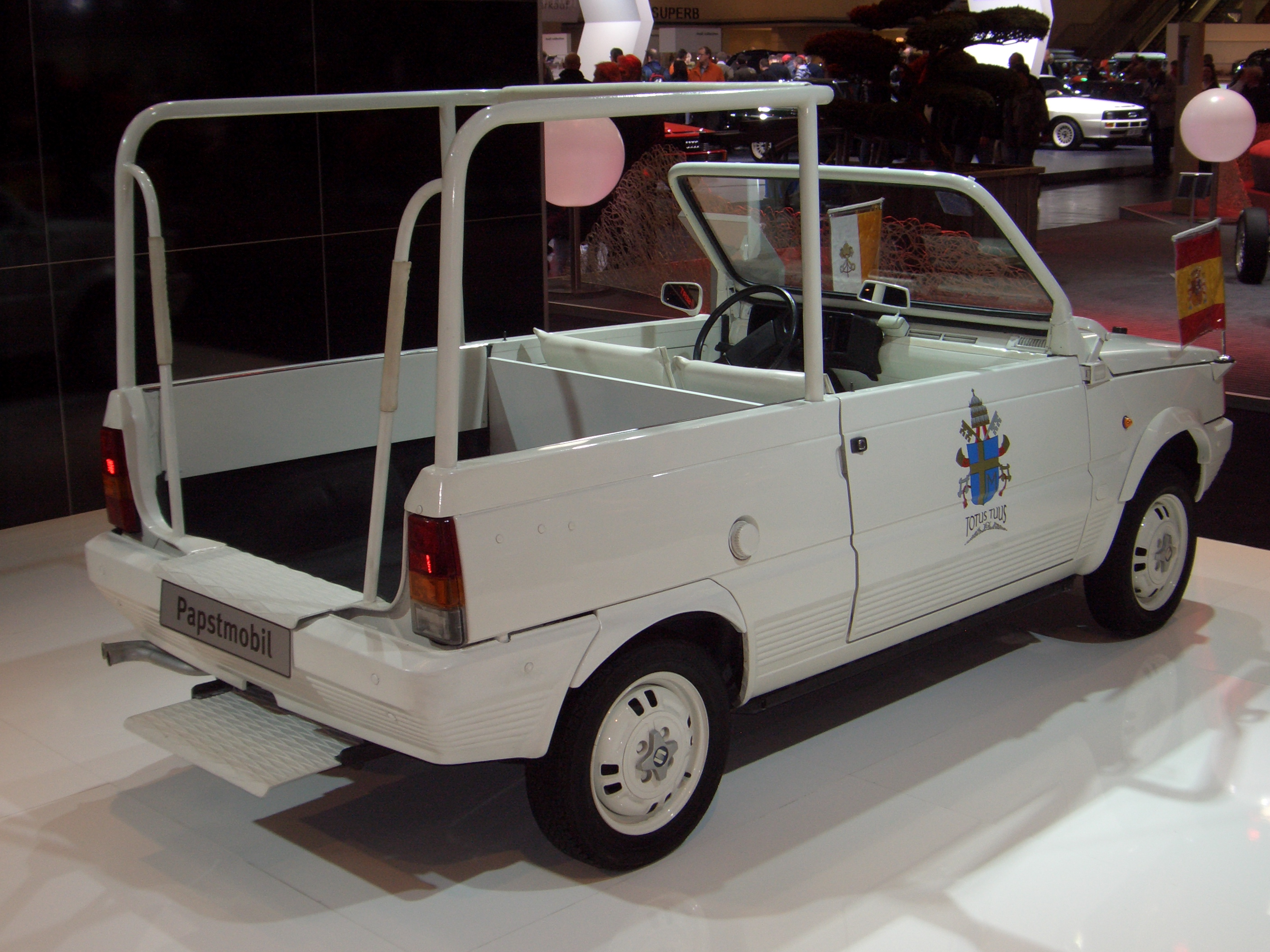
rear view

In 1982 SEAT produced in its plant in Zona Franca a popemobile car, a modified version derived from the SEAT Panda, which was used during the Pope John Paul II's 1982 visit in Spain. That specific vehicle was an 'all-open-air' car with a grab handle in front so that the Pope could stand still to greet the crowds, while the vehicle was in motion. In that car the Pope entered the FC Barcelona Camp Nou soccer stadium driving through the assembled crowds celebrating mass for a congregation of over 121,000 on 17 November 1982.

=== Emelba derivatives ===
The Spanish company Emelba produced several derivative models from the SEAT Panda among others:

- Emelba Elba Cinco puertas (5-door), the sole 5-door version of the SEAT Panda
- Emelba Pandita 4x4
- Emelba Chato / Emelba 903
- Emelba Chato Pick-up
- a SEAT Panda equipped with a Daihatsu diesel engine
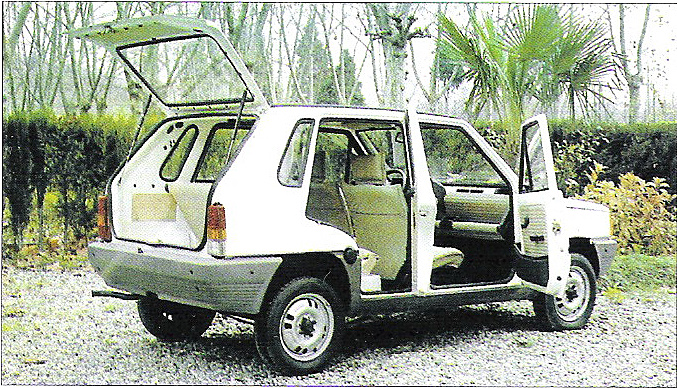
Emelba Elba 5-door

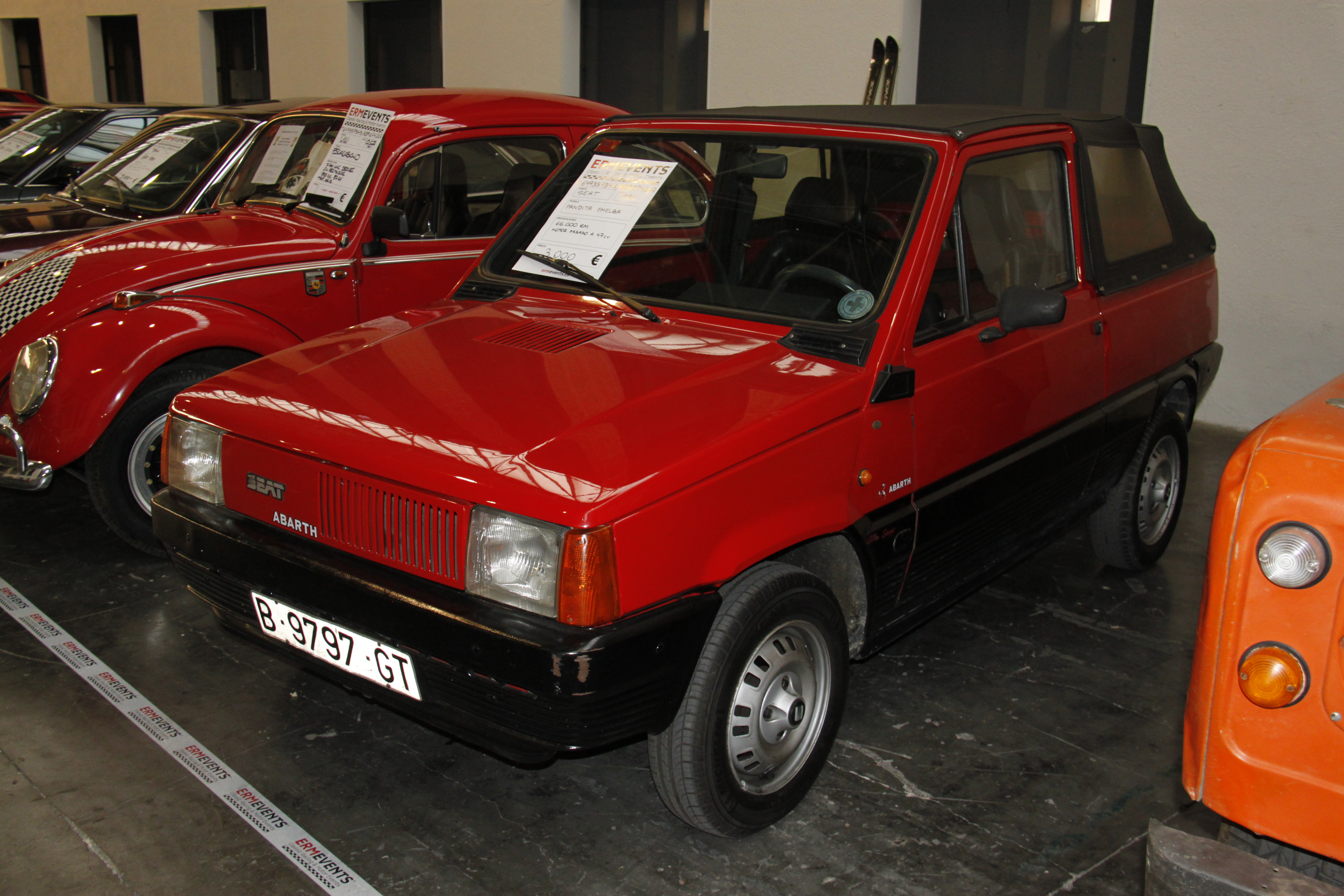
Emelba Pandita

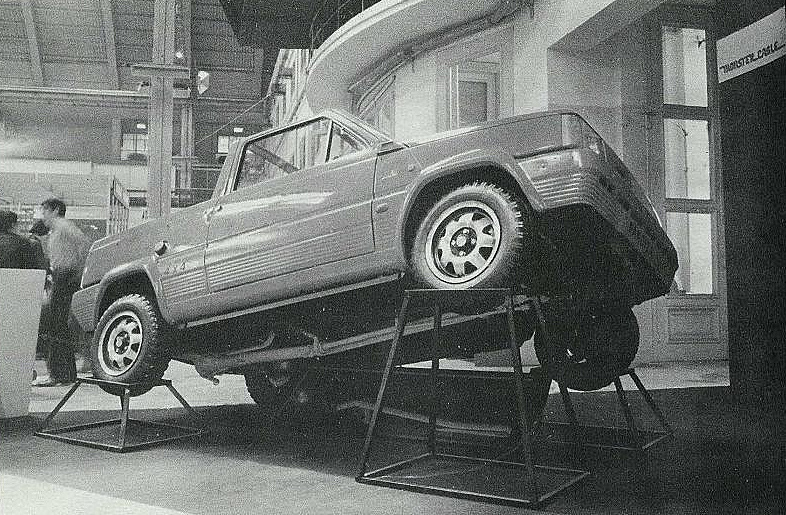
Emelba Pandita 4x4

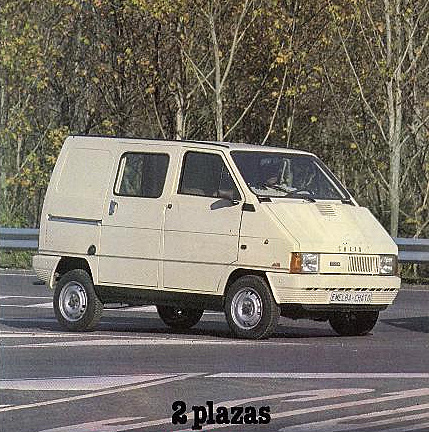
Emelba Chato (later named Emelba 903)

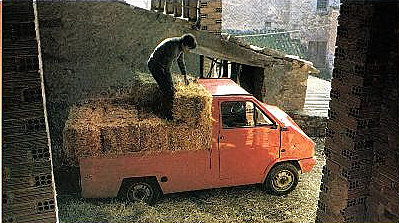
Emelba Chato Pick Up

== Concept cars ==
At the 1991 Frankfurt Motorshow, SEAT presented the SEAT Marbella Playa concept car. This was a "beach car" like the earlier Pandita and Panda Trans but featuring SEAT's new corporate grille. A pre-production example was also completed but the project was halted.

== Motorsport ==
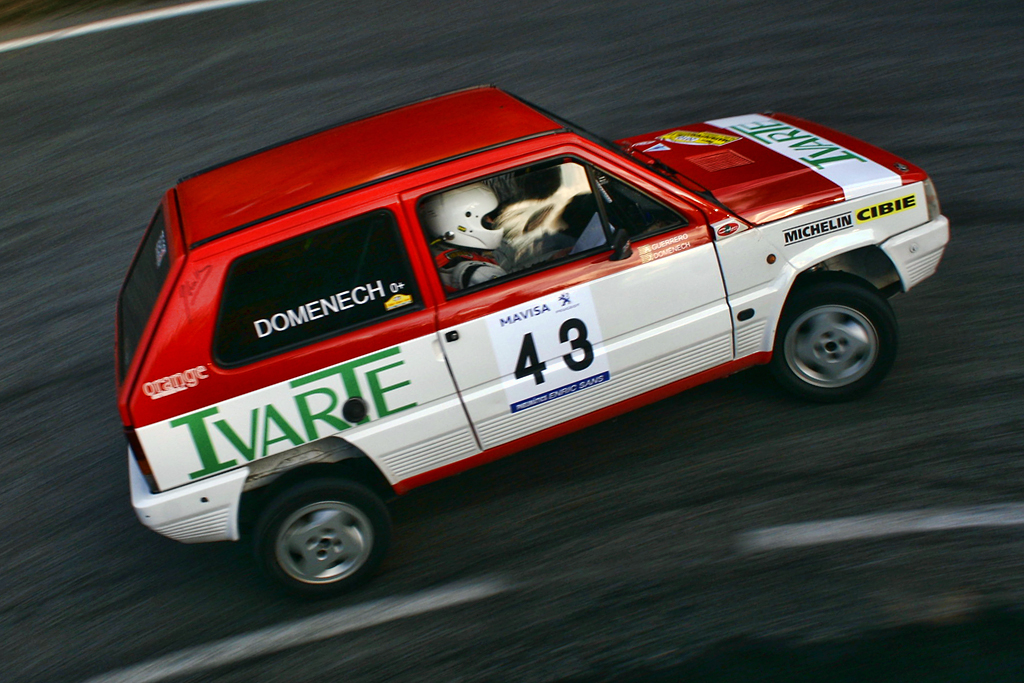
The SEAT Panda driven by Joaquim Doménech for the 'Black MotorSport' racing team.

The SEAT Panda/Marbella has not only taken part and won podium positions in various race events, but also has formed its own 'Copa Panda' one-make rally series, a rally trophy - created in 1980 by SEAT and its motorsport competition director at the time José Juan Pérez de Vargas, standing next to the brand's 'Copa Fura' circuit cup - which was addressed to young drivers aiming to come close to the motorsport experience.

The most renowned rally driver who emerged from that competition series was the Spanish Carlos Sainz, the winner in the first edition of the 'Copa Panda' rally. Due to his win SEAT granted to him as an award a SEAT Panda 45 Grupo 2 rally car, under which he won his first title in the first already season of the 'Copa Panda' championship in 1982.

Together with the integration of the Spanish brand to the Volkswagen group, SEAT was able to strengthen even more its involvement in motorsport activities with the formation of the SEAT Sport department in 1985. Since the SEAT Panda model had been replaced in SEAT's range by the SEAT Marbella in 1986, it was the time that the 'Copa Panda' cup should be succeeded too by the 'Copa Marbella' one. The 'Copa Marbella' formed part of the Spanish Rally Championship gravel schedule during eight years, to be ultimately superseded by the 'Copa Ibiza' rally series. In the 'Campeonato de España de Rallyes de Tierra' championship it was the SEAT Marbella Proto, a car powered by a supercharged 1.3 L 4-cylinder motor derived from the VW Polo G40 equipped with a compressor delivering a horsepower of 140 hp, under which SEAT won the 1988 championship title while in the next season Antonio Rius on the wheel of the Marbella won the two-wheel drive class. In the following years the Marbella was also driven by many drivers among which Àlex Crivillé, Juan Garriga and Jordi Tarrés, with the latter competing successfully against much more powerful cars - like the Lancia Delta - on the driver's seat of a 620 kg lightweight Marbella.

== Sales and production figures ==
The total production per year of SEAT Marbella/Panda and SEAT Terra/Trans cars is shown in the following table:

| Model | 1986 | 1987 | 1988 | 1989 | 1990 | 1991 | 1992 | 1993 | 1994 | 1995 | 1996 | 1997 | 1998 |
|---|---|---|---|---|---|---|---|---|---|---|---|---|---|
| SEAT Marbella/Panda | 36,879 | 56,893 | 71,519 | 82,935 | 90,903 | 80,005 | 74,637 | 33,216 | 27,102 | 29,621 | 21,930 | 18,139 | 2,337 |
| SEAT Terra/Trans | 18,444 | 18,238 | 24,925 | 22,007 | 35,430 | 22,198 | 25,034 | 10,626 | 6,517 | — | — | — | — |
