= Trans Euro Trail =

Motorcycle route in Europe

The Trans Euro Trail or TET is an adventure motorcycle route through Europe consisting of approximately 100,000 kilometres (62,000 mi) of GPX tracks. The Trail contains all kinds of unpaved trails which are officially allowed according to the local laws and regulations of the relevant countries.

== Organisation ==
The TET was founded by John Ross and has been available since 2017.

So-called "Linesmen" keep the GPX tracks in their countries up to date with the assistance of everyone that rides the Trail and of the communities which the trail passes through.

== Route ==
The TET route has two arms:

- Western (Sweden, Norway, Denmark, Germany, Switzerland, Low Countries, UK, France, Andorra, Spain, and Portugal)
- Eastern (Finland, the Baltic states, Poland, Ukraine, Romania, Serbia, Bulgaria, Greece, the Balkans and Italy)

=== Length in country ===
Country	Length km (mi)
Albania	406 kilometres (252 mi)
Andorra	35 kilometres (22 mi)
Austria	Unconfirmed
Belarus	717 kilometres (446 mi)
Belgium	450 kilometres (280 mi)
Bosnia & Herzegovina	610 kilometres (380 mi)
Bulgaria	931 kilometres (578 mi)
Croatia	371 kilometres (231 mi)
Denmark	1,015 kilometres (631 mi)
Estonia	3,063 kilometres (1,903 mi)
Finland	7,690 kilometres (4,780 mi)
France	5,954 kilometres (3,700 mi)
Georgia	4,698 kilometres (2,919 mi)
Germany	1,240 kilometres (770 mi)
Greece	4,079 kilometres (2,535 mi)
Hungary	1,048 kilometres (651 mi)
Italy	3,532 kilometres (2,195 mi)
Latvia	1,802 kilometres (1,120 mi)
Lithuania	740 kilometres (460 mi)
Luxembourg	Unconfirmed
Montenegro	290 kilometres (180 mi)
Netherlands	1,028 kilometres (639 mi)
North Macedonia	Unconfirmed
Norway	1,697 kilometres (1,054 mi)
Poland	1,885 kilometres (1,171 mi)
Portugal	Unconfirmed
Romania	2,134 kilometres (1,326 mi)
Serbia	2,195 kilometres (1,364 mi)
Slovakia	Unconfirmed
Slovenia	442 kilometres (275 mi)
Spain	7,509 kilometres (4,666 mi)
Sweden	2,841 kilometres (1,765 mi)
Switzerland	562 kilometres (349 mi)
Turkey	3,200 kilometres (2,000 mi)
Ukraine	Unconfirmed
United Kingdom	5,307 kilometres (3,298 mi)

== Code of Conduct ==
There is a Code of Conduct translated into all the European languages and a central ethos of

1. Respect for the Trails
2. Respect for the Communities we travel through
3. Respect for the Environment

Publishing the TET is a not for profit Community Interest Company (CIC). The Trail and the logo are trademarked for protection from hijacking and misuse.

The track is available for free and at no cost.

The TET was inspired by the Trans America Trail (TAT).

== See also ==
- Trans America Trail
