= Dan Christensen =

American painter (1942–2007)

- Born: October 6, 1942; Cozad, Nebraska, U.S.
- Died: January 20, 2007 (aged 64); Easthampton, New York, U.S.
- Education: Kansas City Art Institute, University of Indiana
- Known for: Abstract painting
- Movement: Abstract Expressionism, Post-minimalism, Color Field painting, Lyrical Abstraction
- Awards: 1969 Guggenheim fellowship

Dan Christensen (October 6, 1942 – January 20, 2007) was an American abstract painter. He is best known for paintings that relate to lyrical abstraction, color field painting, and abstract expressionism.

Christensen was born in Cozad, Nebraska, and died in Easthampton, New York. His early work from 1965-1966 was related to Minimalism. A graduate of the Kansas City Art Institute, class of 1963, where he studied alongside Ronnie Landfield, Kenneth Showell and Sherron Francis among others. Dan Christensen moved to New York City from the Mid-West during the summer of 1965. Christensen was represented by several influential galleries including the Andre Emmerich Gallery, the Salander/O'Reilly Gallery and various others throughout the United States and Europe. He has had more than seventy-five solo exhibitions and his work has been included in hundreds of group exhibitions. His paintings are in important museum collections throughout the United States and Europe.

== Art world beginnings ==
Dan Christensen arrived in New York City in the summer of 1965 from the Midwest, with the purpose of establishing himself as an important contemporary abstract painter. With his friend from Iowa — the painter David Wagner, he rented a loft on #4Great Jones Street in lower Manhattan. After several months of experimenting on new abstract paintings with interlocking rectangular "L" shapes in shades of tan, grey, ochre and brown that resembled jigsaw puzzles in oil paint, he began to use acrylic paint. Christensen began painting the series of abstract paintings for which he became first known - his Minimal "Bar" paintings in the spring of 1966. After Dave Wagner returned to Iowa in March 1966, his friend the painter Ronnie Landfield shared his Great Jones Street loft with him until the early winter of 1967.

Dan Christensen was part of a large circle of young artists who had come to Manhattan during the 1960s. Kenneth Showell, Peter Young, Michael Steiner, Ronnie Landfield, Dick Anderson, his brother Don Christensen, Peter Reginato, Carlos Villa, David R. Prentice, James Monte, Frosty Myers, Tex Wray, Larry Zox, Larry Poons, Robert Povlich, Neil Williams (artist), Carl Gliko, Billy Hoffman, Francine Tint, Lee Lozano, Pat Lipsky, John Griefen, Brice Marden, John Chamberlain, Donald Judd, Frank Stella, Carl Andre, Dan Graham, Robert Smithson, Robert Rauschenberg, Andy Warhol, Kenneth Noland, Clement Greenberg, Bob Neuwirth, Joseph Kosuth, Mark di Suvero, Sherron Francis, Brigid Berlin, Lawrence Weiner, Rosemarie Castoro, Marjorie Strider, Dorothea Rockburne, Colette, and Marisol were just a few of the artists he saw regularly at Max's Kansas City — the favorite place for artists in New York City during the 1960s.

== Early career ==
In the late fall of 1966 the art dealer Richard Bellamy visited the Great Jones Street loft and began to represent Dan Christensen's work. Bellamy invited Christensen to exhibit his paintings at the Noah Goldowsky Gallery in the late spring of 1967. Dorothy Herzka co-curated a group exhibition that included Dan Christensen, Ronnie Landfield, Kenneth Showell, and Peter Gourfain in February 1967 at the Bianchini Gallery on W. 57th Street in Manhattan. All of those four painters were invited to be included in the Whitney Museum of American Art's 1967 Annual exhibition. In the late spring of 1967 Dan Christensen began painting with spray guns and produced his first "linear spray paintings," for which he became famous. By 1968 he began to exhibit his paintings in important art galleries from New York to California and worldwide. In the late 1960s he participated in several important exhibitions that traveled throughout the United States, including the Lyrical Abstraction Exhibition that originated at the Aldrich Contemporary Art Museum. During the remainder of the 1960s and throughout the 1970s Christensen regularly exhibited his paintings at the André Emmerich Gallery, the Noah Goldowsky Gallery in New York City, the Rolf Ricke Gallery in W. Germany, the Nicholas Wilder Gallery in Los Angeles, and the Meredith Long Gallery both in Houston Texas, and New York City.

Dan Christensen's paintings were included in the Whitney Museum of American Art's annual exhibition's in 1967, 1968 and 1969 and in the first biennial exhibition in 1973. During the late 1960s and 1970s Dan Christensen's paintings were included in numerous group exhibitions, in influential galleries and museums. His work was included in several important articles in the media about the newest generation of American artists. His work was discussed and reviewed in The New York Times, Newsweek, Artforum, Art in America, Art News, and many other periodicals. In 1968 he was awarded a National Endowment for the Arts Grant and he was awarded a 1969 Guggenheim fellowship.

== Late career ==
Christensen's abstract paintings changed and evolved throughout his career. During the final ten years of his life he moved with his family to East Hampton, New York from Manhattan. From November 2001 through February 2002 Christensen had a retrospective exhibition at The Butler Institute of American Art in Youngstown, Ohio; and shows of his paintings in galleries in Boca Raton, Florida, Houston, Texas, Santa Fe, New Mexico, New York City and in 2007 he had a retrospective exhibition at the Spanierman Gallery in Manhattan. His paintings are in the permanent collections of The Whitney Museum of American Art, The Museum of Modern Art, the Solomon R. Guggenheim Museum, the Metropolitan Museum of Art, in New York City, the Museum of Fine Arts, Boston, the Hirshhorn Museum and Sculpture Garden Washington, DC., the Chicago Art Institute, the Nelson-Atkins Museum Kansas City, Missouri, Boca Raton Museum of Art and dozens of others.

== Recent ==
On January 18, 2007 Dan Christensen enjoyed the opening of an important survey exhibition of paintings selected from his long painting career, spanning the years from 1966 until 2007 at the Spanierman Gallery on E. 58th Street in Manhattan. After enduring Polymyositis for nearly nineteen years, Dan Christensen died on Saturday, January 20, 2007. He is survived by his wife Elaine Grove Christensen (sculptor & actress), and his three sons: Moses, James (of the Hip Hop group Junk Science, currently signed to Definitive Jux records) and William, his brother Don and his two sisters Marilyn and Kay.
