= Max's Kansas City =

Nightclub and restaurant in New York City

- Max's
- Interactive map of Max's Kansas City
- Location: Manhattan, New York
- Coordinates: 40°44′12″N 73°59′19″W
- Owner: Mickey Ruskin, Tommy Dean Mills
- Type: Music venue, restaurant

Construction
- Opened: 1965
- Renovated: 1975
- Closed: 1981

Website
- web.archive.org/web/20020122143501/http://www.maxskansascity.com/

Max's Kansas City was a nightclub and restaurant at 213 Park Avenue South in New York City. Opened by Mickey Ruskin in 1965, the original incarnation of Max's Kansas City closed in 1974, but was quickly reopened in 1975 under the ownership of Tommy Dean Mills until 1981. Max's Kansas City was a gathering spot for musicians, poets, artists, and politicians in the 1960s and 1970s. The space embodied the fusion of art, fashion, and rock culture that defined the era and is often remembered as one of the most influential venues in shaping New York's underground cultural scene.

== History ==
In the early 1960s, restaurateur Mickey Ruskin operated several establishments in New York City, gaining a following. In 1965, a space became available at 213 Park Avenue South, between 17th and 18th Street in Union Square. It had originally been opened as a pharmacy by an older owner, who soon realized the location was better suited for a restaurant. The owner converted it into The Southern, later sold it, and eventually had to take it back after the new owner went bankrupt. By then, he was tired of running the place, so Ruskin acquired it with almost no money down and a long-term, affordable lease. He transformed it into Max's Kansas City, which opened later that year.

=== Max's I ===
The grand opening on December 6, 1965, drew a modest crowd of eight, which included artists Larry Zox, John Chamberlain, Neal Williams, Donald Judd, Dan Flavin, and Frank Stella. However, Max's soon became a hangout of choice for artists and sculptors from the Park Place Gallery and the Green Gallery.

Max's had three main areas: Bar, Back Room, and Upstairs. Max's became a favorite spot for Andy Warhol and his "superstars," who dominated the back room that was lit by Dan Flavin's red light installation. His presence attracted hip celebrities and the jet set, helping to cement its allure within the fashion and art worlds. Warhol had a standing arrangement with Ruskin—he traded artwork for credit—so his entourage could simply sign for their dinners until the credit was exhausted. In his memoir Popism, Warhol recalled:

Max's Kansas City was the exact place where Pop Art and pop life came together in New York in the sixties—teeny boppers and sculptors, rock stars and poets from St. Mark's Place, Hollywood actors checking out what the underground actors were all about, boutique owners and models, modern dancers and go-go dancers—everybody went to Max's and everything got homogenized there.

The Velvet Underground played at Max's regularly, including their last shows with Lou Reed before he quit the band, in the summer of 1970. It was a home base for the glam rock scene, which included Marc Bolan, David Bowie, Iggy Pop, Lou Reed, Alice Cooper, the New York Dolls, Jayne County (then Wayne County), Dorian Zero and the Magic Tramps.

Many bands made early appearances there. Bruce Springsteen played a solo acoustic set in the summer of 1972. in the spring of 1972, just after the release of his first album, Bruce and the E street band appeared as the warm up act for Biff Rose the headliner.Biff Rose#cite note-15 He also played sets at the club on November 6, 7, and 8, 1973. Bob Marley & the Wailers opened for Springsteen at Max's, commencing Marley's career on the international circuit. Iggy and the Stooges performed a string of shows in July and August 1973. Big Star performed two shows in December 1973. Patti Smith and guitarist Lenny Kaye also performed there as a duo on New Year's Day 1974, opening for Phil Ochs. Max's was the site of Aerosmith's first New York City gig. Tim Buckley, Tom Waits, Bonnie Raitt, Odetta, Eddie Mottau, Dave Van Ronk, John Herald, Garland Jeffreys, Sylvia Tyson, Emmylou Harris, Gram Parsons, Elliott Murphy and Country Joe McDonald were some of the musicians who also played there.

Fashion designer Carlos Falchi was a busboy, as was artist, publisher and filmmaker Anton Perich; Deborah Harry was a waitress there.

Until February 1974, Max's was regarded as New York's premier Rock club, but the venue faced significant financial difficulties. Ruskin filed for bankruptcy under Chapter XI in August 1974, a provision that allowed the business to remain open while reorganizing its debts. The reasons for the bankruptcy remain contested: Ruskin attributed it to competition from the newly opened Bottom Line, whereas other accounts, including that of Upstairs at Max's manager Faris Bouhofa, cited mismanagement and overexpansion in the preceding years.

In September 1974, the courts appointed restaurateur Donaldo Soviero to take over operations at Max's. Scivero had the option to purchase the club, which he was required to exercise by December 12. When he declined, Ruskin resumed management. However, on December 19, Con Edison shut off the club's power—apparently the final blow for Ruskin, who had only just regained control a week earlier, and Max's was closed indefinitely.

New York City mayor Ed Koch later had a campaign office in the building.

=== Max's II ===
Max's Kansas City reopened in 1975 under the ownership of Tommy Dean Mills, who initially thought he would make it a disco. Peter Crowley, who had been booking the same early punk bands that played at CBGB and Mothers, a gay bar on West 23rd Street, was hired to book bands at Max's.

Under Crowley's guidance the club became one of the birthplaces of punk, regularly featuring bands including Cherry Vanilla, Wayne County & the Electric Chairs, Ruby and the Rednecks, The Offs, The Fast, Suicide (who all appeared on the compilation album 1976 Max's Kansas City), the New York Dolls, Patti Smith Group, the Ramones, the Mumps, the Heartbreakers, Television, Blondie, Talking Heads, Sniper, the Dictators, the Cramps, Mink DeVille, Misfits, Little Annie, the Fleshtones, the B-52's, the Stimulators, the Bongos and Klaus Nomi, as well as out-of-town bands such as the Runaways and the Damned. After the breakup of the Sex Pistols, Sid Vicious played all of his US solo gigs there. Devo played several shows at Max's in 1977, including a show where they were introduced by David Bowie as "the band of the future." Max's Kansas City is mentioned in the Sex Pistols' song "New York" from the album Never Mind The Bollocks, Here's the Sex Pistols, 1977.

Max's original site closed on December 12, 1981. The Rattlers and Ronnie and The Jitters were the performers on the final night. The building survives and in 2010 housed a Korean deli. However, as of April 2026, the space was vacant.

=== Max's III ===
Mills reopened the club again on January 27, 1998, at a new location—240 West 52nd Street—site of the former Lone Star Roadhouse. However, it closed shortly after opening.

The opening had been delayed due to litigation by Ruskin's partner, Yvonne Sewall-Ruskin, who claimed that she owned the trademark to Max's Kansas City and was granted a temporary restraining order to prevent use of the name.

== Legacy ==
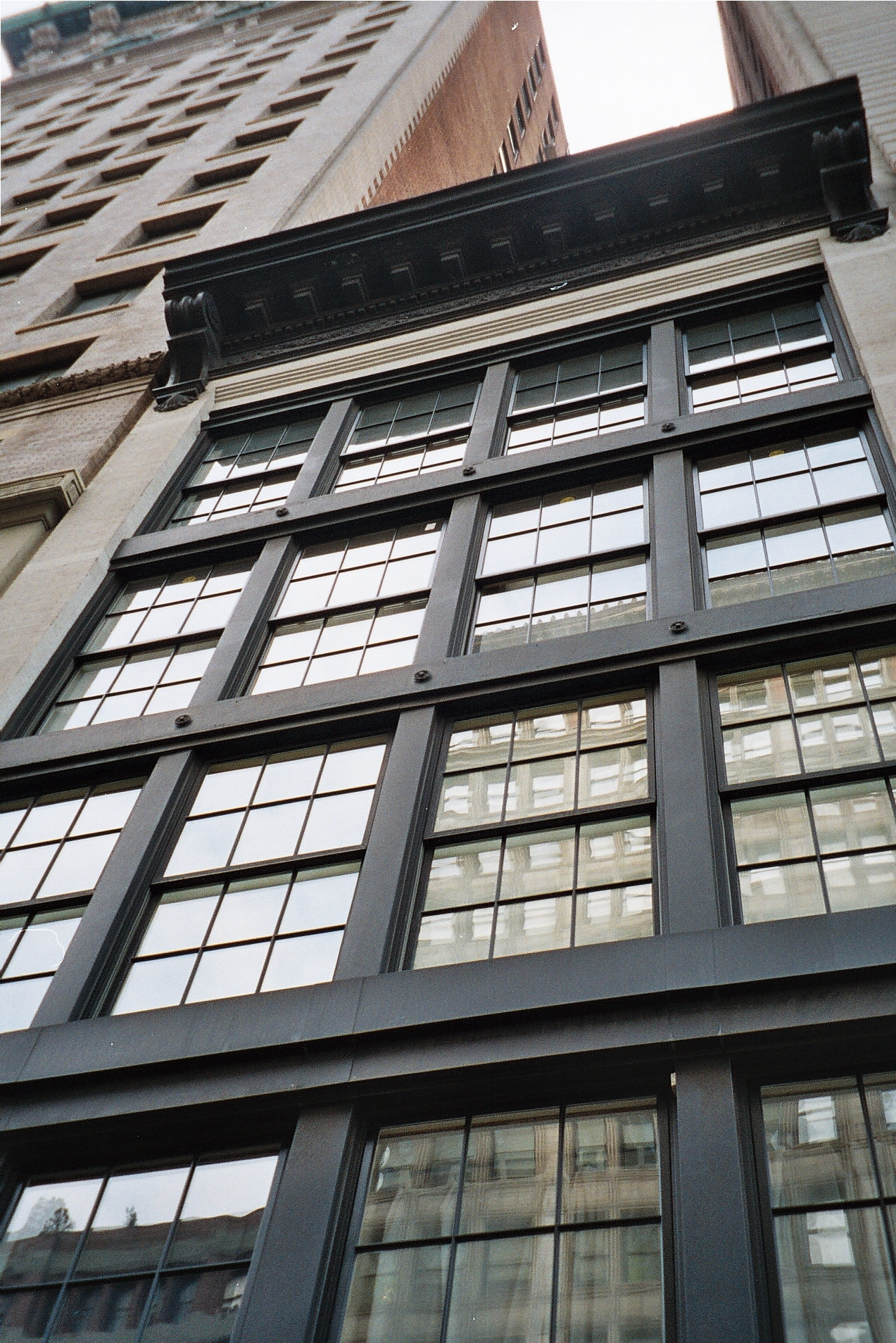
The former home of Max's, 213 Park Avenue South, pictured in 2008

In 2000, Acidwork Productions, Inc., a production company founded by Neil Holstein (second cousin of Mickey Ruskin) began working in conjunction with Victoria Ruskin (Mickey Ruskin's daughter) on a feature-length documentary about Mickey Ruskin and his many establishments, including Max's Kansas City.

In 2001, Yvonne Sewall-Ruskin established the Max's Kansas City Project. In the spirit of Ruskin's philosophy of helping artists in need, the project, a 501(c)(3) non-profit, provides emergency funding and resources for individuals in the arts in crisis. The nonprofit is also dedicated to empowering teens through the arts.

In 2015, photographer Marcia Resnick documented the people at Max's in her book Punks, Poets, and Provocateurs: New York City Bad Boys, 1977–1982.

== Notable patrons ==
- Penny Arcade
- Edward Avedisian
- Carl Andre
- Larry Bell
- Brigid Berlin
- Richard Bernstein
- Norman Bluhm
- David Bowie
- Tally Brown
- David Budd
- William S. Burroughs
- Leo Castelli
- Rosemarie Castoro
- John Chamberlain
- Ching Ho Cheng
- Dan Christensen
- John Clem Clarke
- The Cockettes
- Jackie Curtis
- Willem de Kooning
- Mark di Suvero
- Dan Flavin
- Danny Fields
- Peter Forakis
- Richard Gallo
- Allen Ginsberg
- Lotti Golden
- Philip Glass
- Dan Graham
- Clement Greenberg
- Germaine Greer
- Robert Hughes
- Henry Geldzahler
- Ray Johnson
- Donald Judd
- Colette Justine
- Joseph Kosuth
- Ronnie Landfield
- Fran Lebowitz
- Edward Leffingwell
- Roy Lichtenstein
- Pat Lipsky
- Lucy Lippard
- Lee Lozano
- Robert Mapplethorpe
- Brice Marden
- Marisol
- Taylor Mead
- Marta Minujín
- Malcolm Morley
- Tiger Morse
- Forrest (Frosty) Myers
- Barnett Newman
- Bob Neuwirth
- Max Neuhaus
- David Novros
- Larry Poons
- David R. Prentice
- Robert Rauschenberg
- Peter Reginato
- René Ricard
- Larry Rivers
- Dorothea Rockburne
- Harold Rosenberg
- Lillian Roxon
- Alan Shields
- Patti Smith
- Robert Smithson
- Carolee Schneemann
- Edie Sedgwick
- Richard Serra
- Stephen Shore
- Frank Stella
- Marjorie Strider
- Carlos Villa
- Viva
- Andy Warhol
- Lawrence Weiner
- Neil Williams
- Jack Whitten
- David Whitney
- Peter Young
- Larry Zox
