= Ronnie Landfield =

American painter (born 1947)

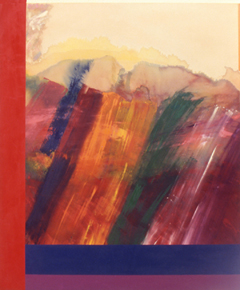
- Garden of Delight, 1971, a/c, 87x72 inches, exhibited: David Whitney Gallery NYC, May 1971, Four Seasons Restaurant, Seagram Building, NYC, 1975-1984, collection:Philip Johnson, (re-acquired by the artist, 1985).
- Born: January 9, 1947 (age 79); Bronx, New York, U.S.
- Education: Kansas City Art Institute, San Francisco Art Institute, Art Students League of New York
- Known for: Abstract painting
- Notable work: Diamond Lake, Portal To Paradise
- Movement: Abstract Expressionism, Post-minimalism, Color Field painting, Lyrical Abstraction

Ronnie Landfield (born January 9, 1947) is an American abstract painter. During his early career from the mid-1960s through the 1970s his paintings were associated with Lyrical Abstraction (related to Postminimalism, Color Field painting, and Abstract expressionism), and he was represented by the David Whitney Gallery and the André Emmerich Gallery.

Landfield is best known for his abstract landscape paintings, and has held more than eighty–five solo exhibitions and more than two hundred group exhibitions. In 2011 he was described by the LewAllen Gallerie as "at the forefront of contemporary art...one of the best painters in America."

== Early career ==
Born and raised in Pelham Parkway in the Bronx, to Nathan and Hilda Landfield. He first exhibited his paintings in Manhattan in 1962. He continued his study of painting by visiting major museum and gallery exhibitions in New York during the early sixties and by taking painting and drawing classes at the Art Students League of New York and in Woodstock, New York. He graduated from the High School of Art and Design in June 1963. He briefly attending the Kansas City Art Institute before returning to New York in November 1963. At sixteen Landfield rented his first loft at 6 Bleecker Street near The Bowery (sublet with a friend from the figurative painter Leland Bell), during a period when his abstract expressionist oil paintings took on hard-edged and large painterly shapes. In February 1964, Landfield traveled to Los Angeles; and in March he began living in Berkeley where he began painting Hard-edge abstractions primarily painted with acrylic. He briefly attended the University of California, Berkeley and the San Francisco Art Institute before returning to New York in July 1965.

== Mid period ==
From 1964 to 1966 he experimented with minimal art, sculpture, hard-edge geometric painting, found objects, and finally began a series of 15 - 9' x 6' mystical "border paintings". After a serious setback in February 1966 when his loft at 496 Broadway burned down, he returned to painting in April 1966 by sharing a loft with his friend Dan Christensen at 4 Great Jones Street. The Border Painting series was completed in July 1966, and soon after architect Philip Johnson acquired Tan Painting for the permanent collection of The Sheldon Memorial Art Gallery in Lincoln, Nebraska.

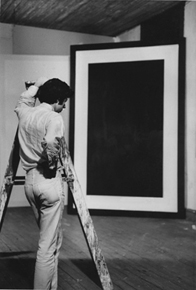
Ronnie Landfield and Border Painting 8, 1966, photo by Tom Gormley NYC. July 1966

In late 1966 through 1968 he began exhibiting his paintings and works on paper in leading galleries and museums. Landfield moved into his loft at 94 Bowery in July 1967; there, he continued to experiment with rollers, staining, hard-edge borders, and painted unstretched canvases on the floor for the first time. Briefly in 1967-1968 he worked part-time for Dick Higgins and the Something Else Press.

Landfield was part of a large circle of young artists who had come to Manhattan during the 1960s. Peter Young, Dan Christensen, Peter Reginato, Eva Hesse, Carlos Villa, William Pettet, David R. Prentice, Kenneth Showell, David Novros, Joan Jonas, Michael Steiner, Frosty Myers, Tex Wray, Larry Zox, Larry Poons, Robert Povlich, Neil Williams, Carl Gliko, Billy Hoffman, Lee Lozano, Pat Lipsky, John Griefen, Brice Marden, James Monte, John Chamberlain, Donald Judd, Frank Stella, Carl Andre, Dan Graham, Robert Smithson, Robert Rauschenberg, Andy Warhol, Kenneth Noland, Clement Greenberg, Bob Neuwirth, Joseph Kosuth, Mark di Suvero, Brigid Berlin, Lawrence Weiner, Rosemarie Castoro, Marjorie Strider, Dorothea Rockburne, Leo Valledor, Peter Forakis and Marisol were just a few of the artists and writers he befriended and saw regularly at Max's Kansas City - the favorite place for artists in New York City during the 1960s.

Landfield invited Dorothy Herzka to his studio in late 1966 and they both co-curated a group exhibition that included Dan Christensen, Ronnie Landfield, Kenneth Showell, and Peter Gourfain in February 1967 at the Bianchini Gallery on W. 57th Street in Manhattan. All of those four painters were invited to be included in the Whitney Museum of American Art 1967 Annual exhibition. By 1970 Landfield was recognized as one of the first painters to have led the "movement away from the geometric, hard-edge, and minimal, toward more lyrical, sensuous, romantic abstractions in colors which were softer and more vibrant." His paintings were part of the Whitney Museum of American Art's Annual exhibitions in 1967 and 1969, and he was included in the first Whitney Biennial in 1973. During the late 1960s through the early '70s his work was included in group exhibitions at the Park Place Gallery, the Bianchini Gallery, the Bykert Gallery, the Sheldon Memorial Art Gallery, the Whitney Museum of American Art, the Museum of Modern Art, the Baltimore Museum of Art, the Studio Museum in Harlem, and the Iris & B. Gerald Cantor Center for Visual Arts (formerly Stanford University Museum of Art) amongst other places. In 1967-1968 two drawings were reproduced in S.M.S. III by the Letter Edged in Black Press, and he was included in New York 10 1969, a portfolio of prints published by Tanglewood Press.

In October 1969 he had his first one-man exhibition at the David Whitney Gallery in NYC, featuring works of that period which were partially inspired by Chinese Landscape painting. His painting Any Day Now, 1969, 108 x 93 inches was acquired by the Whitney Museum of American Art. His painting Diamond Lake 1969, 108 x 168 inches, was acquired from Philip Johnson by the Museum of Modern Art in 1972 and was installed in the lobby of MoMA for several months. His painting Elijah 1969, 108 x 55 inches was later exhibited in Beijing, China in the early 1990s; and it is currently on view in Havana, Cuba.

During 1970 Landfield participated in a three-person show in New York City at the David Whitney Gallery and he had solo exhibitions in Cleveland, St. Louis and in Corona Del Mar, California. In 1971 he held his second solo exhibition at the David Whitney Gallery in New York City. From that exhibition his painting Chinese Winter, 108 x 88 inches was acquired by the Rhode Island School of Design Museum of Art, and his painting Storm Thread, 108 x 94 inches, was acquired by the Smith College Museum of Art. Landfield joined the Andre Emmerich Gallery in April 1972 one month after the David Whitney Gallery closed in March 1972.

== 1973 to 1993 ==
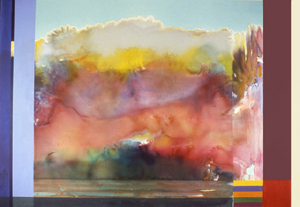
Rite of Spring, 1985, a/c, 79x112 inches, (exhibited: The Brunnier Museum, Ames Iowa, 1988).

Landfield traveled throughout the southwest in 1973 and again in 1975. With his wife and artist friends Peter Young and Carmen Megeath he camped, lived and painted dozens of paintings on canvas and limestone in the mountains outside Zion National Park in southern Utah. He taught Fine Arts at the School of Visual Arts from 1975 until 1990. For ten years from 1975 until 1984 four of Landfield's paintings from the collection of Philip Johnson were installed in the Four Seasons Restaurant in the Seagram Building on Park Avenue between 52nd and 53rd Streets in Midtown Manhattan, on the so-called Mark Rothko wall. In 1975 Landfield began teaching fine arts at the School of Visual Arts in Manhattan; where he taught until 1990.

Spending the early summer of 1980 on the Caribbean island of St. Barts Landfield produced a series of india ink and acrylic paintings on paper there. Throughout the later 1980s and 1990s he often spent summers in various towns throughout the western Catskill Mountains painting abstractions and abstract landscapes in oil paint and acrylic. During the 1980s and early '90s he showed his paintings with the Charles Cowles Gallery and Stephen Haller Fine Arts in New York City. During this period Landfield exhibited his paintings widely. He had solo exhibitions or was included in group exhibitions in Atlanta, Baltimore, Chicago, Houston, Los Angeles, Miami, New Orleans, Paris, San Francisco, Seattle, Washington DC and Zurich, to name a few places.

During the early 1970s to the early 1990s many of Landfield's major paintings entered important public collections. In 1970 his painting St. Augustine, 1968, 108 x 120 inches was acquired by the Norton Simon Museum in Pasadena; in 1971 Shenandoah (for Eva Hesse) 1970, 90 x 113 inches, was acquired by the Walker Art Center in Minneapolis; in 1972, his painting Rain Dance III, was acquired by the Hirshhorn Museum and Sculpture Garden in Washington, DC, and his painting From Portal to Paradise, 1982, 107 x 78 inches, was acquired by the Metropolitan Museum of Art in 1983, among dozens of others. In 1989-1990 Landfield began correspondence with the late art historian, Professor Daniel Robbins, about the neglected historical understanding of abstract painting in New York since the mid-1960s. Landfield began extensive writing and lecturing about abstract painting from the late 1960s to the mid-1970s.

== Recent work ==
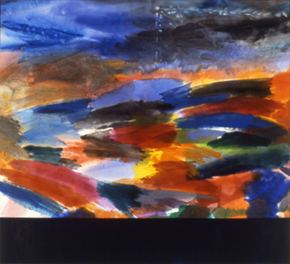
The Deluge, 1999, a/c, 108x120 inches, (exhibited: Salander/O'Reilly Galleries NYC, 2000).

In 1994 Landfield presided over two public panel discussions at the New York Studio School and the Tenri Institute both in Manhattan called Cool and Collected or Too Hot to Handle. In February 1994, he began teaching painting and drawing at the Art Students League of New York. In 1995 he curated Seven Painters at the Nicholas/Alexander Gallery in SoHo, an exhibition that featured seven important abstract painters whose careers began in the mid to late 1960s, some of whom hadn't been shown for many years. In 1996 Landfield had a solo exhibition in Sapporo, Japan and lectured there on American art. In 1997 he aided colleague Ronald Davis's creation of an educational website highlighting abstract art from the 1960s. He was represented by the Salander/O'Reilly Gallery in New York from 1997 until 2007. In October 2005 he had a solo exhibition of his paintings accompanied by a solo show of sculpture by Peter Reginato at the Heidi Cho Gallery in Chelsea.

In 2007 Landfield had a retrospective exhibition Ronnie Landfield: Paintings From Five Decades, at the Butler Institute of American Art Later that year, he had an exhibition of recent paintings entitled Toward Monochrome at the Heidi Cho Gallery in Manhattan. Landfield has exhibited his work in important institutions and galleries for nearly five decades. Currently he lives and works in TriBeCa, and teaches at The Art Students League of New York; during a recent lecture there he said "It's important for maximum freedom for an artist, to stay under the radar for as long as possible". From 2007 until 2016, his work has been exhibited at the Stephen Haller Gallery in New York City and LewAllen Galleries in Santa Fe, New Mexico. He currently is represented by the Findlay Galleries in New York and Florida. He draws, paints and writes left-handed. Landfield's two sons are artists who live in New York: Matthew Hart Landfield is an actor, writer and director, and Noah Landfield is a painter and musician.

At the time of his exhibition at the Butler Institute of American Art in 2007, Landfield was referred to as "one of the best painters in America and has been since he first came on the scene in the 1960s." Louis Zona, director of the institute, says "To stand in front of a Landfield painting is to be transported into a world where color feeds upon color and every inch of the canvas is considered ... Ronnie Landfield is, pure and simple, one of the best painters in America."

Landfield's show Where it All Began was the debut exhibition at the gallery space of the High School of Art and Design in the fall of 2012. In late October 2012 Landfield's home and studio in Tribeca was adversely affected by Hurricane Sandy. In the fall of 2013 his paintings were included in an exhibition called Come Together: Surviving Sandy, Year One curated by Phong Bui and The Daedalus Foundation. In 2014, Landfield and his wife moved their home and his studio to the Hudson Valley in New York state.

Most recently, he has been under the representation of Findlay Galleries, and has had his work in several group and one-man shows. In January 2018, he participated in a live discussion with Michael Rips, the director of the Art Students League of New York, about his life and his art at Findlay Galleries.

== Selected Public Collections ==
- The Metropolitan Museum of Art
- The Museum of Modern Art
- The Whitney Museum of American Art
- The Brooklyn Museum
- The National Gallery of Art
- The Hirshhorn Museum and Sculpture Garden
- The Norton Simon Museum
- The Art Institute of Chicago
- The Walker Art Center
- The Seattle Art Museum
- The Nelson-Atkins Museum of Art
- The High Museum of Art
- The Munson-Williams-Proctor Arts Institute
- The Des Moines Art Center
- The Museum of Contemporary Art, Chicago
- The Sheldon Museum of Art
- The Butler Institute of American Art
- Grey Art Museum, New York University
- Hunter College
- The Art Gallery of Ontario
- The Allen Memorial Art Museum
- The Delaware Art Museum
- The Herbert F. Johnson Museum of Art
- The Iris & B. Gerald Cantor Center for Visual Arts at Stanford University,
- The Boca Raton Museum of Art
- The Federal Reserve Board
- Yale University Art Gallery
- The Bayerische Staatsgemaldesammlungen, Munich, Germany
- CASA CAVAZZINI Museum of Modern and Contemporary Art, Udine, Italy
- The Mississippi Museum of Art
- The Boise Art Museum, Boise, Idaho
- The Frost Art Museum
- The Los Angeles County Museum of Art,
- The Smith College Museum of Art
- The San Francisco Museum of Modern Art
- The New Orleans Museum of Art
- The University of Michigan Museum of Art
- Silverstein Properties, New York, NY
- The University Museum, Southern Illinois University
- The Indianapolis Museum of Art
- The Cedar Rapids Museum of Art
- The Portland Museum of Art, Maine
- The Portland Art Museum, Oregon
- The Philadelphia Museum of Art
- The Frederick R. Weisman Art Museum
- The Memphis Brooks Museum of Art
- The New Britain Museum of American Art
- The University of New Mexico Art Museum
- The Greenville County Museum of Art
- The Spencer Museum of Art
- The Kemper Art Museum
- The Rhode Island School of Design Museum of Art
- The Art Museum of South Texas, Corpus Christi
- The Ringling Museum of Art
- The Robert Hull Fleming Museum
- The Akron Art Museum
- The Palm Springs Desert Museum
- The Bowdoin College Museum of Art, Brunswick, Maine, amongst numerous others.
- Detroit Institute of Arts (Detroit, Michigan)

=== Awards ===
- Gold Medal for Painting San Francisco Art Institute 1965,
- William and Noma Copley Grant (Cassandra Foundation) 1969,
- National Endowment of the Arts Grant Clayworks NYC 1983,
- Pollock-Krasner Foundation Grant 1995,
- Pollock-Krasner Foundation Grant 2001, 2013 (Emergency Grant)
- Artist Fellowship Grant 2001, 2002, 2003, 2007, 2012.
- Adolph and Esther Gottlieb Foundation Emergency Grant, 2012
- Joan Mitchell Foundation Emergency Grant, 2012
- New York Foundation for the Arts Emergency Grant, 2012

== Bibliography ==
- Robert C. Morgan, Dr. Louis A. Zona, Exhibition Catalogue, Ronnie Landfield: Paintings From Five Decades, The Butler Institute of American Art, ISBN 1-882790-50-2
- Perspectives, lecture: Ronnie Landfield and Stephen Polcari, Jackson Pollock's One 1948, El Greco's View of Toledo and Willem de Kooning's Painting 1948. Art Students League of New York, tape on file at the ASL, January 5, 2006.
- Glueck, Grace, Color Coded, Ronnie Landfield and Peter Reginato, at the Heidi Cho Gallery, Chelsea, NYC exhibition review, The New York Times, Art in Review, Friday, November 4, 2005
- Do Aesthetics Matter? A panel discussion with Arthur C. Danto, Robert C. Morgan, Karen Wilkin and Ronnie Landfield as moderator, the Art Students League of New York, January 1999, tape on file at the ASL.
- Wilkin, Karen. At the Galleries, Seven Painters, Exhibition review, Partisan Review, 1996, #1, pp. 91–93.
- Monte, Jim. Seven Painters at Nicholas Alexander, Exhibition review, Art in America, May, 1996, p. 113.
- Karmel, Pepe. Seven Painters, Exhibition review, New York Times, November 17, 1995, p. C30.
- Landfield, Ronnie, In The Late Sixties, 1993–95, and other writings - various published and unpublished essays, reviews, lectures, statements and brief descriptives at abstract-art.com.
- Cool and Collected or Too Hot to Handle Panel Discussion, Tenri Cultural Institute. New York Panelists included: Ronnie Landfield, Klaus Kertess, Ellen Handy, Joan Snyder, and Karen Wilkin as moderator. Sponsored by Triangle Artists Workshop, tape on file, 1994.
- Cool and Collected or Too Hot To Handle. A Modernist Response to Post-Modernism, Panel Discussion, text on file, New York Studio School, New York Panelists included: Ellen Handy, William Pettet, John Griefen, Peter Reginato, and Ronnie Landfield as moderator, 1994.
- Negroponte, Diane, Contemporary American Artists, Exhibition Catalogue, US Embassy, Manila, the Philippines, 1994.
- The Landscape in Twentieth-Century American Art, Selections from the Metropolitan Museum of Art, Rizzoli, NY 1991, p. 165.
- Wilder, Nicholas, Nicholas Wilder on Ronnie Landfield, April 1989
- Messenger, Lisa, Dialogues in Art, Exhibition Catalogue, Palazzo Ducale di Gubbio, Italy 1984.
- 1973 Biennial, Exhibition Catalogue, Whitney Museum of American Art, NYC. December, 1973
- Stephen Prokopoff. Two Generations of Color Painting, Exhibition Catalogue, Philadelphia Institute of Contemporary Art, 1971.
- Lyrical Abstraction, Exhibition Catalogue, Whitney Museum of American Art, NYC, 1971.
- Highlights of the 1969-1970 Season, Exhibition Catalogue, Aldrich Museum of Contemporary Art, Ridgefield Conn.
- Annual Exhibition, Exhibition Catalogue, Whitney Museum of American Art, NYC. Dec.1969.
- Aldrich, Larry, Young Lyrical Painters, Art in America, v.57, n6, November–December 1969, pp. 104–113.
- Junker, Howard, The New Art: It's Way, Way Out, Newsweek, July 29, 1968, pp. 3, 55-63.
- Annual Exhibition, Exhibition Catalogue, Whitney Museum of American Art, NYC. Dec.1967.
