= Stephen Haller Gallery =

Art gallery in Manhattan, New York

Coordinates: 40°45′1.12″N 74°0′17.29″W

The Stephen Haller Gallery is a contemporary art gallery in Chelsea, Manhattan, New York City. The gallery exhibits significant, contemporary painting and is known for presenting paintings imbued with rich textures and surfaces. Stephen Haller Gallery represents artists Catherine Gfeller, Johannes Girardoni, Sam Jury, Ronnie Landfield, and Larry Zox.
