= Richard Gallo (performance artist) =

American actor (1946–2007)

- Born: November 18, 1946; Brooklyn, New York, US
- Died: July 8, 2007 (aged 60); New York City, US
- Education: Pratt Institute
- Occupations: Performance Artist, Actor
- Years active: 1968–1980

Richard Gallo (November 18, 1946 – July 8, 2007) was an American stage actor, performance artist, and experimental theater stage director, noted mostly for his street performances and provocative costumes. His work blurred the boundaries between performance art, theatre, and fashion. Gallo performed outside the luxury stores and hotels on Fifth Avenue wearing costumes that referenced glamour, sadomasochism, and high fashion. His street performances challenged mainstream conceptions of identity, masculinity, and sexuality.

He was known as "Lemon Boy" for his use of lemons as props.

== Early life ==
Gallo was born on November 18, 1946, in the Kensington section of Brooklyn New York. He studied advertising, theater, and art studio at Pratt Institute from 1964 to 1968. While at Pratt, he became close friends with fellow student Robert Wilson and performed in several of his early productions, including The King of Spain (1969), The Life and Times of Sigmund Freud (1969), Deafman Glance (1970) and The Life and Times of Joseph Stalin (1973).

== Career ==
Beginning in 1968, while still a student at Pratt, Gallo enlisted the help of several peers, including Alan Sigman and Robert Ippolito, to assist him in staging public performances. Many of the earliest performances were held at Grand Army Plaza in Manhattan. Often these performances would be interrupted by the police, which usually ended with a summons or arrest for not having a permit for exhibition. On one occasion, after refusing to break character when approached by the police, he was detained and spent several days in Bellevue Hospital. Gallo described the typical arc of his performances: "The crowd would build up and then the traffic would slow to see what was happening. Then the police would show up. When I heard the siren I knew the show was over. It was a good ending."

Other performance locations included Van Cleef & Arpels, Harry Winston, Tiffany & Co., Peck & Peck, and the steps and forecourt of the main branch of the New York Public Library.

Around this same time, from 1971 to 1972, Gallo could often be found in the back room of Max's Kansas City amongst other habitués of the New York City art scene, including Warhol superstars Holly Woodlawn and Candy Darling, as well as influential writers such as Rene Ricard and Glenn O'Brien.

In 1973, Gallo was invited to headline his original theatrical production of Squalls for the International Festival Mondial du Théâtre in Nancy France. Prior to the opening, hundreds of posters promoting the show were either defaced by graffiti or torn down. This vandalism foreshadowed the raucous crowds that attended the actual performances. One member of the crowd, theater critic and NYU Drama Professor Michael Kirby, described Squalls as the only theatrical event where he had ever witnessed an "overt confrontation by the bourgeoisie" and, "according to the model of Ubu Roi…the only avant-garde performance [he had] ever seen."

After he returned from France, Gallo performed in Robert Wilson's The Life and Times of Joseph Stalin, which premiered on December 14, 1973, at the Opera House of the Brooklyn Academy of Music in Brooklyn, New York.

After The Life and Times of Joseph Stalin, he discontinued working in theatre or performing on the streets. From 1974 through 1978, he became more immersed in the New York City fashion scene and began to frequent Studio 54 where he resumed his performance art. While there, he was photographed by several, including Allan Tannenbaum, Anton Perich, Dustin Pittman and Felice Quinto. In 1978, he participated in Robert Wilson's Video 50. In 1979, he returned to theater when he was selected to perform his original production, Tip of the Iceberg / Suspect on Black Coal at the 1979 Pan American Games in San Juan Puerto Rico. Each of these performances culminated in Gallo floating across the stage on a 20-foot-long fork, while below, the classically-trained vocalist Asha Puthli sang Ave Maria.

The following year, he staged A Killer's Loose But Nobody's Talking with Sheryl Sutton at The Kitchen, a performing arts theater in New York City.

== Later years and death ==
In winter 1982, Gallo suffered a stroke in the stairwell outside his apartment on the Upper East Side. As a result, he was partially disabled and unable to continue performing. He remained at this same residence until his death on July 8, 2007, aged 60. Little is known about the last years of his life, including the cause of his death. He is buried in Mount St. Mary Cemetery in Flushing, Queens New York.

== In popular culture ==
Joseph Beuys was rumored to have gifted him a roll of felt, which he had tailored into a costume. Andy Warhol remarked that he was "more glamorous than Marlene Dietrich." Robert Wilson said that he was the "equivalent of a theatrical warehouse."

Gallo's visual aesthetic has been noted as an influence with Michael Jackson and the white sequined glove he made famous on the Motown 25 television special in 1983. Beginning in 1973, Gallo often wore and was photographed on many occasions wearing a similar-looking glove gifted to him by the fashion designer Philip Haight. Gallo frequently wore this same glove to Studio 54 around the same time that Michael Jackson was also a patron.

Gallo was a subject for many famous photographers, including Christopher Makos, Peter Hujar,Marcus Leatherdale,Sylvia Plachy, Andy Warhol and Jack Mitchell. He was also photographed by Bert Stern and featured in Vogue magazine.

== Exhibitions ==
Richard Gallo: Performance and Studio 1968–1980 at the Cressman Center for Visual Arts in Louisville Kentucky. January 18 – February 23, 2019.

== Performances ==
- White Line (running 40 blocks and ending at the Atlas Statue Rockefeller Plaza), 1968
- The King of Spain, Anderson Theater, New York City, 1969
- untitled performance at a leveled demolition site at East 57th and 3rd Avenue, 1969
- untitled performance, Tiffany & Co. flagship store, 1969
- untitled performance, The Sherry-Netherland, 1969
- untitled performance, Peck & Peck Department Store, 1969
- Red X, Grand Central Terminal, 1969
- White Chairs with Crayfish with Mary Peer, the Atlas Statue (400 lemons), 1969
- untitled performance outside the Rockefeller Center, 1969
- The Life and Times of Sigmund Freud, Brooklyn, 1969
- The Story of Joan Davis (with the Bold brothers), Grand Army Plaza in Manhattan, 1971
- Deafman Glance (Brooklyn, Paris, and Iowa City), 1971
- The Rare Jewels of the World, Harry Winston Store, 1971
- The Three-Legged Television, Elgin Cinema, 1971
- Lemon Heads, St. Patrick's Cathedral, 1971
- The Golden Broccoli, Grand Army Plaza in Manhattan, 1971
- untitled performance at Bergdorf Goodman Building Department Store, 1971
- Image of Women in Spider's Black Veils, the New York Public Library Main Branch, 1972
- untitled performance at the Van Cleef & Arpels jewelry store, 1972
- The Lemon Man with Electric Bulbs at 57th and 5th avenue
- Squalls, Grand Theater, Nancy France International Festival Mondial du Théâtre May 4–6, 1973
- The Life and Times of Joseph Stalin, Brooklyn, 1973
- untitled performance, the main branch of The New York Public Library] (with Linda Yablonsky and Irwin Sheftel), 1976
- Hurricane David recorded by Victor Ginzburg, 1979
- Tip of the Iceberg / Suspect on Black Coal, Pan-American Games, San Juan Puerto Rico, 1979
- Video 50 at Centre Georges Pompidou, Paris, 1979
- A Killer's Loose But Nobody's Talking, The Kitchen NYC May 15–16, 1980
