= Sam Jury =

British visual artist

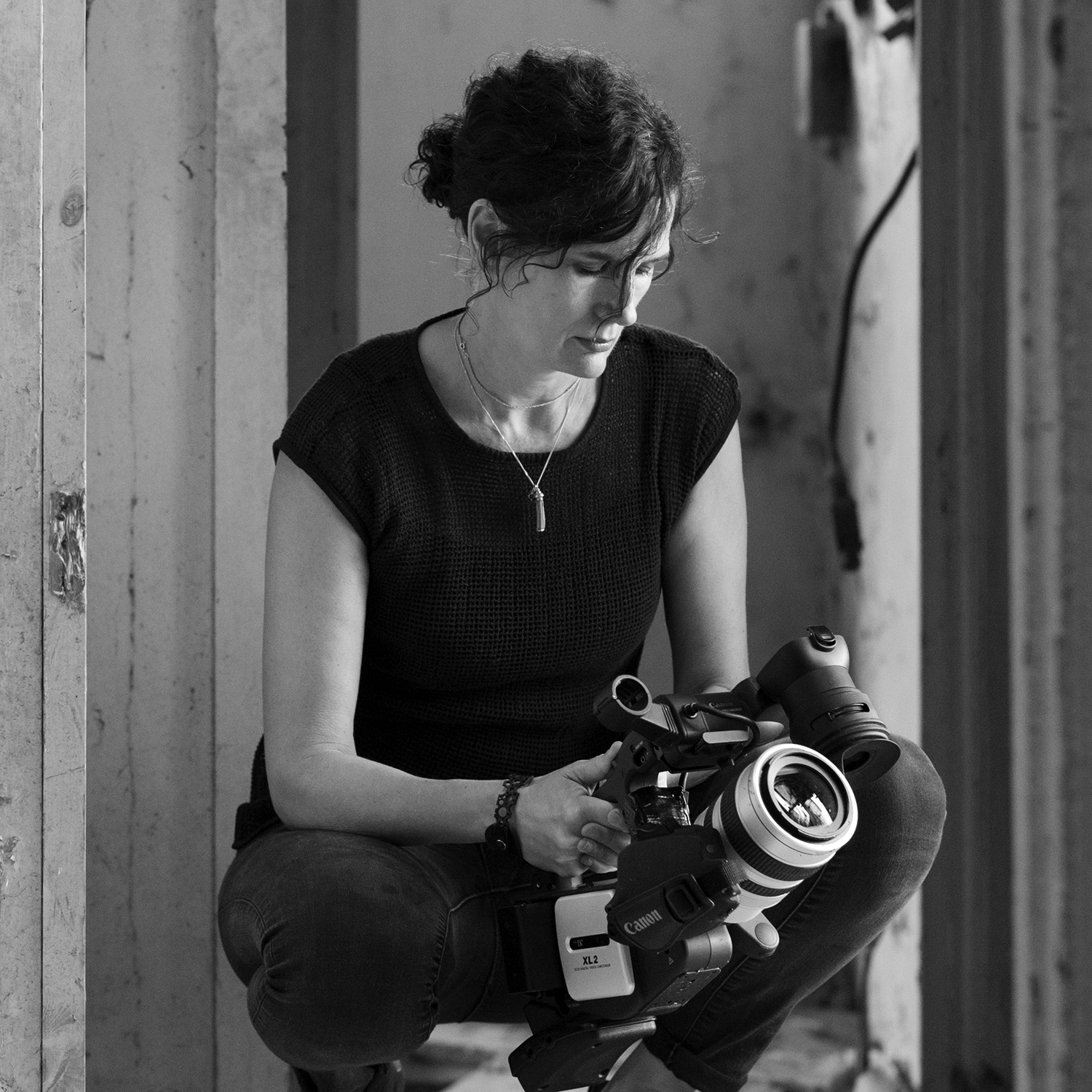
Sam Jury

Sam Jury is a British visual artist based in Cambridge, UK.

Jury is best known for her work in the areas of photography, moving image and installation. Her work is included in the collections of the National Gallery Washington, the Irish Museum of Modern Art, and the Broad/MSU Museum of Art. Her work often deals with notions of trauma and its retelling through shared narratives. Research in this field was awarded an Arts Humanities Research Council grant in 2022.
