= Catherine Gfeller =

Swiss artist (born 1966)

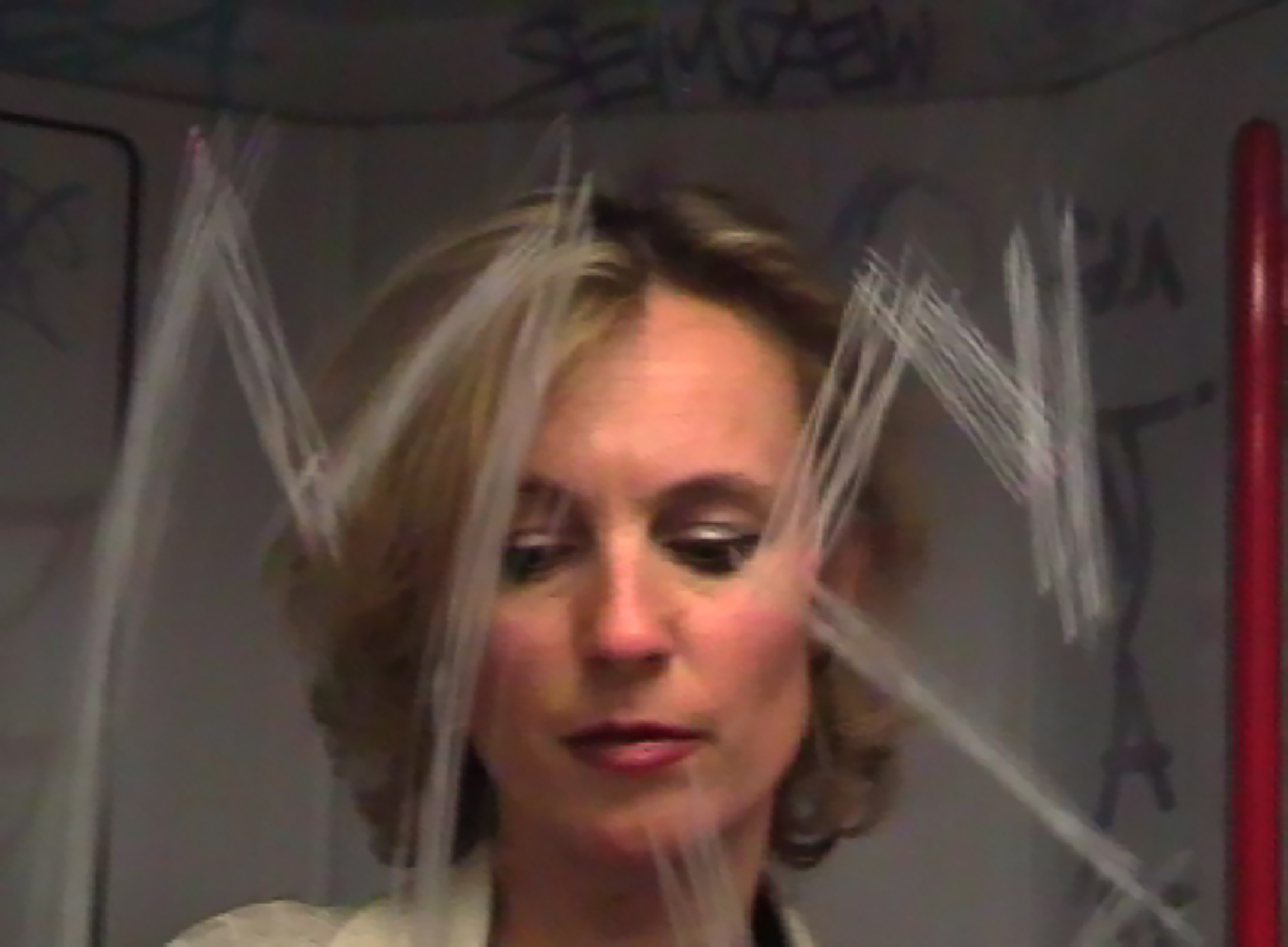
- Gfeller in 2002
- Born: 5 March 1966 (age 60); Neuchâtel
- Education: Université de Neuchâtel, Université de Lausanne, School of Visual Arts New York
- Known for: artist, photographer, videoartist, videomaker
- Website: catherinegfeller.com

Catherine Gfeller (born 5 March 1966) is a Swiss artist. She currently lives and works in Paris and Southern France after having lived in New York from 1995 to 1999.

She has held numerous exhibitions around the world since 1988 and takes part in contemporary art fairs. Her works can be found in public and private collections.

== Biography ==
Catherine Gfeller was born on 5 March 1966 à Neuchâtel. She is originally from Worb, in the canton de Berne. She also holds French nationality.

She obtained a master in French literature and art history in 1991 as well as a certificat d'aptitudes pédagogiques at the Université de Neuchâtel, then taught for a number of years. In 2003, she also obtained a degree in aesthetics and psychoanalysis from the université de Montpellier.

From 1988 to 2022, she held numerous exhibitions in Switzerland and abroad (In Europa, but also in South Africa, North America et South America, in China and in Ukraine), where her works can be found in numerous public and private collections.

She has been known to take part in contemporary art fairs such as Art Basel, Art Unlimited, KunstZurich, Armory Show, the Foire internationale d'art contemporain de Paris, Paris Photo, the Biennale de Ljubljana, and Art Bruxelles.

Alongside her exhibitions, she gives lectures and leads workshops at various art schools and universities. She also commission works for buildings in the public space.

She currently resides and works in Paris and the South of France after spending five years in New York.

== Artistic career ==
She began photography in the eighties with a passion for landscapes.

In 1995, she was awarded a grant from the canton and the city of Neuchâtel, enabling her to continue her research in New York, where she lived until 1999. There, she created the Frises Urbaines series, long horizontal compositions obtained by mounting, collaging and superimposing images, giving life to a universe that is both close to and distant from the reality of the city.

In 1999, she moved to Paris, where she was awarded the prix de la Fondation HSBC for photography. Since then, the city, taken in a metaphorical sense, has been a source of inspiration for many of her works (Multi-compositions), which combine photography, video and writing. Some of the series (Les Déshabilleuses, les Dérangeuses, les Frayeuses) feature female protagonists whose bodies are immersed in exterior and interior space in a play of multiple imbrications.

In 2010-2011, the solo exhibition Pulsations was shown at the Musée des Beaux-Arts de La Chaux-de-Fonds, the Kunstmuseum in Lucerne and the Centre Régional d'Art Contemporain de Sète : visitors are invited to wander through large-scale installations in the form of photographs, videos, sound pieces and multi-projection.

Catherine Gfeller's works have the quality of speaking directly to the viewer through the diversity of her means of expression. She has a way of looking at the world that touches the very heart of our lives. The characters in her videos and photos are all of us. Her vision is unique. There have been thousands of photographers who have focused on urban space. But she is a musician who gives us the rhythm of the city. In that sense, all her work is a performance, with her as conductor. Urs Stahel

After several residencies in South Africa, in 2014 the WAM Museum in Johannesburg presented a monographic exhibition of work produced there under the title Passing the City through You.

Throughout 2015, she was the guest artist at the Centre Paul-Klee in Berne. She was to make around fifteen interventions combining different media to create a dialogue between the art of Paul Klee and the architecture of Renzo Piano, including a sound trail exploring both the interior of the museum and the surrounding landscape.

After several visits, the Taras Shevchenko National Museum in Kyiv, Ukraine, welcomed Gfeller in 2017 for her exhibition Voices in Kyiv. Here she presented the work she had done accompanying Ukrainian writers through the districts of Kyiv, combining their interpretations of the city with her own vision.

During 2016, she had been involved in a project in China, China Driftings, the first part of which was exhibited at the Guangdong National Museum of Art in Guangzhou in 2018 in Canton. This exhibition would continue, through residencies, in Hong Kong, Chengdu, Shanghai and Pékin until 202.

In 2022, she won the Support for Contemporary Documentary Photography prize organized by the CNAP (Centre National des Arts Plastiques, Ministry of Culture, Paris) for her Firelands project devoted to landscapes ravaged by fire.

In 2023, Gfeller created an exhibition called Rhythms in Médine en Saudi Arabia illustrating "the coexistence and convergence of man and the city" as part of the Smart Madinah Forum.

In 2024, she was invited by the French Embassy in Riyadh to carry out an artistic residency in collaboration with the artist Daniah ALSALEH on the theme of Saudi women. The exhibition Woven Portraits, Dreamscapes of a city would be presented at Fondation l'Art Pur during March and April of 2024.
