= Michael Kirby (theater) =

Michael Stanley Kirby (1931 – February 24, 1997) was a professor of drama at New York University. He wrote several groundbreaking books, including Happenings, Futurist Performance and The Art of Time. He was editor of The Drama Review from 1969 to 1986.

Although he taught at NYU simultaneously with Richard Schechner and shared an interest in avant-garde performance, he disagreed with Schechner about what should appear in TDR and about the value of the field that was emerging at the time, performance studies. Kirby believed theatrical events should be documented, not criticized or analyzed using the tools of social sciences.

He studied at Princeton University and graduated in 1953, majoring in psychology. He continued his education at Boston University College of Communication where he earned a MFA in directing and then a PhD from BU's drama department.

== Personal ==
Kirby was born in California, with an identical twin who later collaborated with him on some of his writings. He graduated from Rye High School in New York. He died of leukemia.
