= Nicholas Wilder =

American painter

- Born: Nicholas Walter George Wilder; 1937; Rochester, New York, U.S.
- Died: May 12, 1989 (aged 51–52)
- Education: Amherst College; Stanford University
- Occupations: Art dealer, painter
- Known for: Nicholas Wilder Gallery, Los Angeles
- Partner: Craig Cook

Nicholas Walter George Wilder (1937 – May 12, 1989) was an American art dealer and owner of an eponymous contemporary art gallery in Los Angeles in the 1960s and 1970s. He later closed his gallery, returned to his native New York, and developed a second career as a painter.

== Biography ==
Wilder was born in Rochester, New York. His father was a scientist for Kodak and helped develop Kodachrome film. His father died when Wilder was aged 11 from cancer, which Wilder believed was related to the industrial nature of his work. The Los Angeles Times says that Wilder was falsely believed to be an heir to the Kodak company, which helped create a mystique upon arrival in Los Angeles. He suffered from dyslexia throughout his life. He graduated from Amherst College in 1960, having studied under Henry Steele Commager. He developed an interest in art after working as a guard at Amherst College's museum and helping as a projectionist for slide lectures on art history. Wilder met Marcel Duchamp at Amherst when Duchamp lectured there when the college recreated the 1913 Armory Show. Determined to live in California, Wilder began a law degree at Stanford University, but immediately changed his degree to art history. Wilder worked at the Lanyon Gallery in Palo Alto before establishing his eponymous gallery in Los Angeles in 1965. Wilder moved his gallery from La Cienega Boulevard to Santa Monica Boulevard in 1970 and he entered psychotherapy. Despite his profligate spending on artists, he had difficulty paying bills in the late 1970s and he was pursued by the Internal Revenue Service as his taxes were three years late. In the last decade of his life, Wilder lived in New York on Manhattan's 11th Street and developed a second career as a painter, creating "abstract assemblages". He continued to sell art privately. Wilder's first solo show was at Los Angeles's James Corcoran Gallery in 1986, his last was in Chicago at the Compassrose Gallery in 1988.

Wilder was friends with the British artist David Hockney and became Hockney's dealer in California. Hockney depicted Wilder in his 1966 painting Portrait of Nick Wilder. Hockney included a drawing of Wilder in Friends, his 1976 collection of lithographs of acquaintances.

Wilder was noted for his personal style and enjoyed chili dogs from Pink's Hot Dogs on La Brea Avenue. His obituary in the Los Angeles Times described him as "a genteel man of impeccable manners with a hippie bent" and that "...those who knew him best, particularly his artists, came away impressed with his modesty, frankness, humor and the purity of his passion for art. He seemed blessed with an ability to find gifted artists and home in on their best works". Wilder was gay and believed that this had a "certain sociological effect" due to the disenfranchisement that gay people experienced at that time. Wilder felt that despite his "natural instincts" being those of "a politician, entrepreneur and gambler" he had to look for a profession where he could be deemed acceptable and that "being an art dealer is an occupation for disenfranchised people" concluding that he "never knew a good one who wasn't a woman, Jewish or gay".

He died in 1989 of complications from AIDS. Wilder was sanguine about his AIDS diagnosis saying that "the bad news is that I have AIDS. The good is that I am going to live to be 80. ...I don't feel cheated. I never have. My whole life has been adventure and this is just one more". He was survived by his partner, Craig Cook, his mother and two siblings. Wilder's library was acquired by the Osaka Art Museum in Japan following his death.

== Nicholas Wilder Gallery ==
Wilder helped promote the work of many New York-based artists in California, including Helen Frankenthaler, Barnett Newman, Jules Olitski, Kenneth Noland, and Cy Twombly. In 1962 Wilder established a gallery in San Francisco before opening the Nicholas Wilder Gallery in 1965 at 814 North La Cienega Boulevard, in Los Angeles. To help finance the opening of the new Los Angeles gallery Wilder sold shares in his venture to his friends, and bought the shares back following the gallery's successful opening. Edward Avedisian was the subject of the inaugural show at the gallery. A new exhibition was shown for every month of the 14 years that Wilder's gallery was open. In the initial years of the gallery Wilder was selling $2 million of art annually (equivalent to $18,516,746 in 2025) and later stated that there were only "about six galleries and 30 artists that counted". In 1970 the gallery moved to 8225 ½ Santa Monica Boulevard before its closure in 1979. Wilder's gallery suffered financial problems before its closure. Wilder displayed the work of Ronald Davis, Robert Graham, Allan McCollum, John McCracken, Bruce Nauman, Peter Young, Bill Pettet and several others at the early stages of their artistic careers. Wilder also promoted painter John McLaughlin. Wilder estimated that he had made over 100 trips outside the United States seeking clients and selling art during the 14-year tenure of his gallery. The art market had changed by the mid 1970s and Wilder's gallery became less financially viable, which Wilder attributed to his "extravagance and lack of business sensibilities" and less appetite among buyers for the work of unknown and younger artists.

Wilder closed his gallery on December 31, 1979, having previously given his clients a year's notice to find new representation. Following the closure, several of his most important clients moved to the James Corcoran Gallery for representation. Wilder returned to his native New York. In an interview in 1988, a year before his death, Wilder spoke of the early years of his gallery saying that "In those days, art was all about art and artists. Now it's all about institutions and money" and commentated that one of the reasons for the closure of his gallery was that "Big name artists were getting too expensive".

The archives of the Nicholas Wilder Gallery were donated to the Smithsonian Institution's Archives of American Art in 1998 by Matthew Curtis Klebaum, a friend of Wilder's. The bulk of the records date from 1968 to 1979 and include inventory cards, correspondence and financial records.

In 2005, the Franklin Parrasch Gallery and Joan T. Washburn Gallery of New York City showed an exhibition in tribute to Wilder of works associated with his gallery. The catalogue to the exhibition featured an essay by art historian Katherine Bishop Crum.
