= Marjorie Strider =

American painter, sculptor and performance artist (1931 - 2014)

- Marjorie Strider, seated in front of her work, Girl with Radish (1963), in a black-and-white photograph by Fred W. McDarrah. Her subject is polychrome painted on a flat surface, with three-dimensional eyelashes and lips, and a spherical radish in her mouth.
- Born: Marjorie Virginia Strider; January 26, 1931; Guthrie, Oklahoma
- Died: August 27, 2014 (aged 83)
- Known for: Painting, sculpture, performance art
- Movement: Pop Art, avant-garde
- Spouse: Michael Kirby (m. 1960–1969)

- Visual Works
- Girl with open mouth. 1963 © Michael Chutko
- Come Hither, 1963, acrylic on epoxy-coated Styrofoam mounted on masonite and wood panel, 63 inches by 42 inches by 9 inches
- Green Triptych (1963), three painted bikini-clad women with three-dimensional breasts and buttocks

Marjorie Virginia Strider (January 26, 1931 – August 27, 2014) was an American painter, sculptor, and performance artist best known for her three-dimensional paintings and site-specific soft sculpture installations.

== Biography ==
Born in 1931 in Guthrie, Oklahoma, Strider studied art at the Kansas City Art Institute before moving to New York City in the early 1960s. Strider's three-dimensional paintings of beach girls with "built out" curves were prominently featured in the Pace Gallery's 1964 "International Girlie Show" alongside other "pin-up"-inspired pop art by Rosalyn Drexler (the only other female), Roy Lichtenstein, Andy Warhol, Ben Johnson, and Tom Wesselmann. Her comically pornographic Girl with Radish was made into the banner image for the show, one of the first successful exhibitions of the then-new gallery. Her bold figural work from this era aimed to subvert sexist images of women in popular culture by turning objectified female bodies into menacing forms that literally got "in your face." Strider had two subsequent solo exhibitions at the Pace Gallery in 1965 and 1966 where she continued to show her voluminous paintings of bikini-clad girls as well as 3-D renderings of vegetables, fruits, flowers, clouds and other natural phenomena.

Strider became a core member of the 1960s avant-garde. She performed in happenings organized by Allan Kaprow, Claes Oldenburg and others. In 1969 she organized with Hannah Weiner and John Perreault the first Street Work (a wordplay on earthwork), an informal public art event. Twenty artists participated including Vito Acconci, Gregory Battcock and Arakawa. Strider's contribution was thirty empty picture frames which she hung in random locations in Midtown Manhattan in the hopes of getting pedestrians to look at their environment differently. Strider married Michael Kirby, a contemporary artist and writer, who published Michael Kirby: Happenings; Jim Dine, Red Grooms, Allan Kaprow, Claes Oldenburg, Robert Whitman; An Illustrated Anthology written and edited by Michael Kirby (New York: E. P. Dutton & Co., Inc.), in 1965. and later became a professor of theater and performance at New York University.

On the 23rd and 24th of March, 1971, Marjorie Strider presented Cherry Smash at the Whitney Museum of American Art in New York.

Around this time, for Claes Oldenburg's birthday, Strider made chocolate casts of Patty Mucha Oldenburg's breasts (a plaster version was later acquired by Sol LeWitt). Perhaps it was her intimate friendship with the Oldenburgs that led Strider to redirect her artistic focus from hard sculptural paintings to soft sculpture in the 1970s. She made site-specific installations of unbridled polyurethane foam that tumbled out of windows (Building Work 1976, PS1) or oozed down a spiral staircase (Blue Sky 1976, Clocktower Gallery). At times her renegade pours incorporated domestic objects (brooms, groceries, teapots), while others remained totally amorphous. These works are similar in style and intent to Lynda Benglis' floor paintings and soft sculptures of the same era.

From 1982 to 1985, a retrospective of her work toured museums and universities across the United States. Venues included: SculptureCenter, New York; Gibbes Museum of Art, Charleston, South Carolina; Joslyn Art Museum, Omaha, Nebraska; Museum of Art, University of Arizona, Tucson; and the McNay Art Museum, San Antonio, Texas. In the 1990s, she began to make paintings with tactile surfaces that were more Abstract Expressionist than Pop. In 2009 she revisited her original girlie theme, painting new examples which she exhibited at the Bridge Gallery, New York.

Marjorie Strider died at her home in Saugerties, New York, on August 27, 2014.

== Works ==
- Strider, Marjorie (1982). Marjorie Strider: 10 Years, 1970-1980, Selected Works. Hillwood Art Gallery, Long Island University.

== Public collections ==
- Albright–Knox Art Gallery, Buffalo New York
- Aldrich Contemporary Art Museum, Ridgefield, Connecticut
- Boca Raton Museum of Art, Boca Raton, Florida
- CUNY Graduate Center, New York
- University of Colorado Boulder, Colorado
- Danforth Museum of Art, Framingham, Massachusetts
- Des Moines Art Center, Des Moines, Iowa
- First National Bank, Seattle, Washington
- Solomon R. Guggenheim Museum, New York
- Hirshhorn Museum and Sculpture Garden, Washington, D.C.
- Indianapolis Museum of Art, Indianapolis, Indiana
- McNay Art Museum, San Antonio, Texas
- National Gallery of Art, Washington, D.C.
- New York University, New York
- Newark Museum, Newark, New Jersey
- New Mexico Museum of Art, Santa Fe, New Mexico
- Storm King Art Center, Mountainville, New York
- Temple University, Philadelphia, Pennsylvania
- Vero Beach Museum of Art, Vero Beach, Florida
- Wadsworth Atheneum, Hartford, Connecticut

== Selected exhibitions ==
- 2011 Hollis Taggart Galleries, New York, "Marjorie Strider" [solo exhibition] (catalogue)
- 2010 University of the Arts, Philadelphia, "Seductive Subversion: Women Pop Artists, 1958–1968" [traveling exhibition] (catalogue)
- 1999 Neuberger Museum of Art, SUNY Purchase (catalogue)
- 1995 Andre Zarre Gallery, New York, "Recent Paintings”
- 1988–90 Finn Square, New York, "Sunflower Plaza," outdoor installation
- 1984 Bernice Steinbaum Gallery, New York, "Wall Sculpture and Drawings”
- 1982 Myers Fine Art Gallery, SUNY Plattsburgh, "Marjorie Strider: 10 Years, 1970–1980" [traveling exhibition through 1985] (catalogue)
- 1976 The Clocktower, New York
- 1976 PS1, New York
- 1974 Weatherspoon Art Gallery, University of North Carolina, Greensboro, "Strider: Sculpture and Drawings 1972–1974" (brochure)
- 1966 Pace Gallery, New York
- 1965 Pace Gallery, New York
- 1964 Pace Gallery, New York, "First International Girlie Exhibit"

== Selected sources ==
- Alloway, Lawrence. Great Drawings of All Time: The Twentieth Century, Volume 2, New York: Shorewood/Talisman, 1981.
- Battock, Gregory, ed. Super Realism: A Critical Anthology, New York: Dutton, 1975
- Dewey, Diane. "Marjorie Strider, Pioneering ’60s Artist Remains a Creative Force: Influential Postmodernist Continues to Speak through her Strong Contemporary Style," Artes Magazine, November 24, 2009
- Hess, Thomas B. and Elizabeth C. Baker, eds. Art and Sexual Politics. New York: MacMillan
- Hess and Linda Nochlin, eds. Woman as Sex Object. New York: Newsweek, Inc., 1972
- Hunter, Sam. American Art of the 20th Century. New York: Harry N. Abrams, 1972
- Johnston, Jill. Marmalade Me. New York: Dutton, 1971
- Jones, V. W. Contemporary American Women Sculptors. Phoenix: Onyx Press, 1983
- Kirby, Michael. The Art of Time. New York: Dutton, 1969
- Lippard, Lucy. Pop Art. New York: Frederick A. Praeger, 1966
- Lippard. From the Center, feminist essays on women’s art. New York: E.P. Dutton & Co., Inc., 1976
- Lippard. Six Years: the Dematerialization of the Art Object. New York: Praeger, 1973
- Lippard. The Pink Glass Swan, 1995.
- Pincus-Witten, Robert. Postminimalism. New York: Out of London Press, 1977
- Rubinstein, Charlotte Streifer. American Women Sculptors, A History of Women Working in Three Dimensions. Boston: G.K. Hall & Co., 1991
- Sachs, Sid and Kalliopi Minioudaki, eds. Seductive Subversion: Women Pop Artists, 1958–1968. Philadelphia, PA: University of the Arts, Philadelphia, 2010.
- Semmel, Joan. A New Eros. New York: Hacker Art Books, 1977
- Sewall-Ruskin, Yvonne. High On Rebellion. New York: Thunders Mouth Press, 1998
- Yau, John. Marjorie Strider. New York: Hollis Taggart Galleries, 2011
