= Peter Young (artist) =

American painter (born 1940)

- Born: January 2, 1940 (age 86); Pittsburgh, Pennsylvania, U.S.
- Known for: Abstract painting
- Movement: Abstract expressionism, post-minimalism, lyrical abstraction

Peter Ford Young (born January 2, 1940) is an American painter. He is primarily known for his abstract paintings that have been widely exhibited in the United States and in Europe since the 1960s. His work is associated with Minimal Art, Post-minimalism, and Lyrical Abstraction. Young has participated in more than a hundred group exhibitions and he has had more than forty solo exhibitions in important contemporary art galleries throughout his career. He lives in Bisbee, Arizona.

== Career ==
He began his career as an abstract painter in New York City during the mid-1960s. During the 1960s and 1970s his paintings were included in two annual exhibitions at the Whitney Museum of American Art, and group exhibitions at the Museum of Modern Art, the Solomon R. Guggenheim Museum, the Leo Castelli Gallery among several other venues. In April 1971 his work was discussed at length and appeared on the cover in Artforum magazine, written by art historian and professor of modern art at Oberlin College, Ellen H. Johnson.

During the summer and early fall of 2007 Young had a major retrospective exhibition of his paintings from the period from 1963 through 1977 at P.S. 1 Contemporary Art Center in Queens and at the Mitchell Algus Gallery in Chelsea in New York City.

== Awards ==
- 1968 : National Endowment for the Arts Grant.
- 1969 : Theodoran Award, Solomon R. Guggenheim Museum.

== Collections ==
- Museum of Modern Art New York City
- Whitney Museum of American Art, Solomon R. Guggenheim Museum
- Hirshhorn Museum and Sculpture Garden Washington, D.C.
- St. Louis Art Museum, Allen Memorial Art Museum
- Blanton Museum of Art
- Seattle Art Museum
- Stamford Museum, Stamford, CT
- Speed Art Museum

== Solo exhibitions ==
- 2024 : Peter Young and Maren Hassinger: Forms Unbound, Gallery Wendi Norris, San Francisco, CA
- 2012 : Peter Young, Tucson MOCA, Tucson, Arizona
- 2012 : Paintings, Algus Greenspon, New York, New York
- 2007 : Paintings: 1963 – 1977, PS1 Contemporary Arts Center, Long Island City, New York
- 2007 : Folded Mandalas & Oaxacan Paintings, Mitchell Algus Gallery, New York, New York
- 2003 : Small Dot Drawings, Daniel Weinberg Gallery, Los Angeles, California
- 1999 : The Mandala Paintings, Elizabeth Cherry Contemporary Art, Tucson, Arizona
- 1999 : Linear Weave, Salon, San Miguel de Allende, Guanajuato, Mexico
- 1997 : 3 Small Paintings, Elizabeth Cherry Contemporary Art, Tucson, Arizona
- 1989 : Dot Collage, Braunstein/Quay Gallery, San Francisco, California
- 1984 : Linear Weave, Oil and Steel Gallery, New York, New York
- 1980 : Linear Weave, Cochise Fine Art, Bisbee, Arizona
- 1980 : Linear Weave, Leo Castelli Gallery, New York, New York
- 1976 : Mandalas and Miniatures, Texas Gallery, Houston, Texas
- 1974 : Mandala Fold, Noah Goldowsky Gallery, New York, New York
- 1972 : Dot, Galerie Ricke, Cologne, Germany
- 1972 : Vertical Fold, Noah Goldowsky Gallery, New York, New York
- 1971 : Stick Painting, LoGuidice Gallery, Chicago Illinois
- 1971 : Stick Paintings, Noah Goldowsky Gallery, New York, New York
- 1971 : Stick Paintings, Galerie Ricke, Cologne, Germany
- 1970 : Beads, LoGuidice Gallery, Chicago Illinois
- 1970 : Beads, Noah Goldowsky Gallery, New York, New York
- 1970 : Beads, Galerie Ricke, Cologne, Germany
- 1968 : Dot, Galerie Ricke, Kassel, Germany
- 1968 : Curvilinear, Nicholas Wilder Gallery, Los Angeles, California

== Group exhibitions ==
- 2012 : The Emerald City, Thomas Solomon Gallery, Los Angeles, California
- 2011 : The Indiscipline of Painting, Selected by Daniel Sturgis, Tate St. Ives UK touring to Warwick Art Centre (2011/12)
- 2012 : The Air Show, Tucson MOCA, Tucson, Arizona
- 2007 : Block Party II – An Exhibition of Drawings, Daniel Weinberg Gallery, Los Angeles, California
- 2006 : High Times, Hard Times: New York Painting 1967–1975, Weatherspoon Art Museum, University of North Carolina at Greensboro, Greensboro, North Carolina
- 2006 : Block Party – An Exhibition of Drawings, Daniel Weinberg Gallery, Los Angeles, California
- 2005 : On Paper – Drawings from the 1960s to the Present, Daniel Weinberg Gallery, Los Angeles, California
- 2005 : The Natalie and Irving Forman Collection, Albright-Knox Art Gallery, Buffalo, New York
- 2005 : Amy Granat, Alex Hay, Chuck Nanney, Peter Young, Curated by Olivier Mosset, Galerie Les Filles du Calvaire, Paris, France and Brussels, Belgium
- 2005 : Wilder: A Tribute to Nicholas Wilder Gallery, Los Angeles 1965-1979”, Parrascha and Washburn Galleries, New York, New York
- 2004 : Curious Crystal of Unusual Purity, MoMA PS1 Contemporary Art, Long Island City, New York
- 2002 : Dan Walsh & Peter Young, Museum Of Contemporary Art, Tucson, Arizona
- 2002 : Einfach Kunst; Sammlung Rolf Ricke, Staatliches Museum fur Kunst und Design, Nurnberg
- 1999 : Arizona Biennial, Tucson Museum of Art, Tucson, Arizona
- 1995 : Seven Painters, Nicholas Alexander Gallery, New York, New York, curated by Ronnie Landfield
- 1991 : The Legacy of Karl Blossfeldt, Jan Turner Gallery, Los Angeles, California
- 1987 : Braunstein/Quay Gallery, San Francisco, California
- 1987 : Vision of Innerspace, Wight Gallery, U.C.L.A., Los Angeles, California; the National Gallery of Modern Art, New Delhi, India
- 1985 : Philip Johnson Bequest Exhibition, Museum of Modern Art, New York, NY
- 1983 : Stand Punkt, Galerie Ricke, Cologne, Germany
- 1981 : 20th Century American Art: Highlights of the Permanent Collection, Whitney Museum of American Art, New York, New York
- 1981 : New Acquisitions, Neuberger Museum, Purchase, New York
- 1981 : The Bisbee Seven, University Club of Phoenix, Phoenix Arizona
- 1981 : Oil and Steel Gallery, New York, New York
- 1981 : 8 Bisbee Artists- Works on Paper, touring exhibition sponsored jointly by the Utah Arts Council and the Arizona Commission on the Arts
- 1980 : Bisbee in Santa Fe, Armory for the Arts, Santa Fe, New Mexico
- 1979 : From Allen to Sucker, Texas Gallery, Houston, Texas
- 1978 : Point, Philadelphia College of Art, Philadelphia, Pennsylvania
- 1977 : Pima Community Art Gallery, Tucson, Arizona
- 1975 : El Color Como Lenguaje, International Program of the Museum of Modern Art, New York City; exhibition travels to Instituto Nacional de Bellas Artes, Mexico City, Mexico; Museu De Arte Moderna, Rio de Janeiro, Brazil and São Paulo, Brazil; Museo Nacional, Bogotá, Colombia; Museo de Arte Moderne, Caracas, Venezuela
- 1974 : Eight Artists, Art Museum of South Texas, Corpus Christi, Texas; exhibition travels to Miami Museum of Art, Miami, Florida
- 1972 : The Contemporary Arts Council Selects Art of the 70's, Seattle Art Museum Pavilion, Seattle, Washington
- 1972 : Painting – New Options, Walker Art Center, Minneapolis, Minnesota
- 1972 : Documenta 5, Kassel Germany
- 1971 : Noah Goldowsky Gallery, New York, New York
- 1971 : Six Painters, Albright-Knox Art Gallery, Buffalo, New York; in collaboration with the Baltimore Museum of Art, Baltimore, Maryland; Milwaukee Art Center, Milwaukee, Wisconsin
- 1970 : Noah Goldowsky Gallery, New York, New York
- 1970 : Painting Annual, Whitney Museum of American Art, New York, New York
- 1970 : Klischee & Antiklischee, Aachen, Germany
- 1970 : Zeichnungen Amerikanischer Kunstler, Galerie Ricke, Cologne, Germany
- 1969 : Thirty-First Biennial Exhibition of Contemporary Painting, Corcoran Gallery of Art, Washington D.C.
- 1969 : The Development of Modernist Painting: From Jackson Pollock to the Present, Steinberg Art Gallery, Washington University in St. Louis, Missouri
- 1969 : David Diao / Richard Pettibone / Peter Young, Leo Castelli Gallery, New York, New York
- 1969 : Nine Young Artists, Theodoron Awards, Solomon R. Guggenheim Museum, New York, New York
- 1969 : Program II, Galerie Ricke, Cologne, Germany
- 1969 : Highlights of the 1968-69 Art Season, Aldrich Museum of Contemporary Art, Ridgefield, Connecticut
- 1969 : The George Waterman Collection, Rhode Island School of Design, Providence, Rhode Island
- 1969 : Eine Tendez, Zeitgenessischer, KV Cologne, Germany
- 1968 : Program I, Galerie Ricke, Cologne, Germany
- 1968 : Noah Goldowsky Gallery, New York, New York
- 1968 : Painting Annual, Whitney Museum of American Art, New York, New York
- 1967 : Noah Goldowsky Gallery, New York, New York
- 1967 : Bianchini Gallery, New York, New York, curated by Dorothy Herzka and Ronnie Landfield
- 1967 : Cornell University, Ithaca, New York
- 1967 : Sheldon Memorial Art Gallery, Lincoln, Nebraska
- 1967 : A.M. Sachs Gallery, New York, New York
- 1967 : Ithaca College Museum of Art, Ithaca, New York
- 1967 : Mark Twain State Bank, St. Louis, Missouri

== In popular culture ==
Young is featured in the 2016 documentary about Andy Warhol's work, Brillo Box (3 ¢ Off).

== Sources ==
Peter Young, Paintings 1963-1980, copyright the Parc Foundation 2007, ISBN 978-1-931885-68-3
