= Neil Williams (artist) =

American painter (1934–1988)

- Born: 1934; Bluff, Utah, U.S.
- Died: March 28, 1988, 53; Manhattan, New York, U.S.
- Education: San Francisco Art Institute
- Known for: Painting
- Movement: Hard-edge painting, Minimalism, Shaped Canvas, Lyrical Abstraction
- Awards: 1968 Guggenheim Fellowship

Neil Williams (1934 – March 28, 1988), was an American painter and educator. Williams was an abstract painter primarily known for his pioneering work with shaped canvases in the early 1960s. His paintings of the 1960s, 1970s and 1980s are associated with geometric abstraction, hard-edge painting, color field, and lyrical abstraction, although he did not readily subscribe to any category for his work. He taught fine arts at the School of Visual Arts, from the late 1970s until the early 1980s.

== Biography ==
Williams was born in 1934, in Bluff, Utah. He was in the process of moving to Brazil when he died in New York City at the age of 53.

Williams graduated from the San Francisco Art Institute in 1959; showed his work in 1959 at the City Lights Bookstore in San Francisco and moved to New York City that same year. He began exhibiting his paintings in New York in 1960. He was a regular patron of Max's Kansas City throughout the period of the mid-1960s and early 1970s when it belonged to his friend Mickey Ruskin.

His paintings were exhibited at important art galleries in New York including solo exhibitions at the Green Gallery (1964), and the André Emmerich Gallery (1966 and 1968) both on 57th Street in Manhattan and at the Dwan Gallery in Los Angeles (1966). His work was included in several important group exhibitions during the 1960s including in 1966 the influential Systemic Painting exhibition that showcased Geometric abstraction in the American art world via Minimal art, Shaped canvas, and Hard-edge painting curated by Lawrence Alloway at the Solomon R. Guggenheim Museum in New York City. He also participated in several group exhibitions at museums including 2 Whitney Museum of American Art annuals in 1967 and 1973; the Park Place Gallery and galleries and museums elsewhere. In 1968 he was the recipient of a Guggenheim Fellowship. Williams had four more solo exhibitions in New York during the 1970s. By 1982 he had a solo exhibition in Brazil and decided to move there permanently. In 1986 he had a career retrospective in the historic Clocktower Gallery in New York City, (currently directed by Alanna Heiss, founder and former Director of P.S.1 Contemporary Art Center in Long Island City, Queens).
