= Rosemarie Castoro =

American artist

- Born: 1939; New York, New York
- Died: 2015 (aged 75–76)
- Movement: Minimalism
- Website: rosemariecastoro.com

Rosemarie Castoro (born in Brooklyn, New York, United States; 1939 – 2015) was an American artist associated with the New York Minimalists. She worked in drawing, painting, sculpture, and other media. She was associated with Minimalism, Conceptual art, and concrete poetry. Castoro was a practitioner of monochrome painting and abstraction. Movement of the human body through physical space was a recurring theme in her work.

A retrospective of her work is being shown at Mostyn gallery in Llandudno, UK until 24 February 2024.

== Life and work ==
Castoro graduated from Pratt Art Institute in 1963.

In the 1960s, she participated in several performances with Minimal Dance pioneer Yvonne Rainer and became involved with the study of choreography at the Pratt Institute. Castoro graduated from the Pratt Institute, cum laude, with a BFA in 1963. She was involved with the Art Workers Coalition which met in her studio at 151 Spring Street. In the 1970s, Castoro developed a strong focus on sculpture. In 1971, she created a series of giant minimal sculptures called Free Standing Wall Pieces which encouraged performative interaction. The surfaces of the panels are treated with graphite, gesso and marble dust, thickly applied creating massive rough brush strokes. According to a statement made by her gallery representative, “she was acutely aware that women artists working in a formalist style milieu were not spared the gender-based dismissal of the time,” even while she remained “strictly dedicated to her non-representational abstract style of work.”

== Rosemarie Castoro at Artpark ==
Castoro's work, Flashers, is featured in the 1979 poster of Artpark under the title, "Public Sculpture for the Post-Heroic Age". Artpark features sculptural, performance art, and public art. Castoro made these sculptures— seven-foot-tall figurative black forms of galvanized sheet metal—for Artpark. In this exhibition, on view in New York from May 13–November 13, 1983, Castoro provided a voice for figurative art and a medium for its exploration.

== Exhibitions ==
- Rosemarie Castoro: Focus at Infinity, Museu d'Art Contemporani de Barcelona (MACBA), 2017, Castoro's first major museum retrospective curated by Tanya Barson
- Women in Abstraction at the Centre Pompidou, 2021.
- Carving Space, Mostyn, Llandudno, North Wales, UK, 21 October 2023 – 24 February 2024. A retrospective.
- Making Their Mark: Works from the Shah Garg Collection, 2024.

== Collections ==
- Museu d’Art Contemporani de Barcelona (MACBA)
- Berkeley Art Museum and Pacific Film Archive (BAMPFA).
- Museum of Modern Art, New York
- Collection U.S. Embassy
- Smithsonian American Art Museum, Washington, D.C.

== Grants ==
- Guggenheim Fellowship, 1971
- New York State Council on the Arts 1972, 1973
- National Endowment for the Arts, 1975, 1985
- Tiffany Foundation, 1977
- Pollock-Krasner Foundation, 1989, 1998
