= Lee Lozano =

American painter, and visual and conceptual artist (1930–1999)

- Lozano in 1971
- Born: Lenore Knaster; November 5, 1930; Newark, New Jersey, U.S.
- Died: October 2, 1999 (aged 68); Dallas, Texas, U.S.

Lee Lozano (November 5, 1930 – October 2, 1999) was an American painter, and visual and conceptual artist.

== Biography ==
=== Early years ===
Born Lenore Knaster in Newark, New Jersey, she started to use the name "Lee" at the age of fourteen, often preferring to go by the simpler, if more enigmatic "E". She attended the University of Chicago as an undergraduate from 1948 to 1951, studying philosophy and natural sciences, and received a B.A. She married Adrian Lozano, a Mexico-born architect, in 1956; they divorced four years later. During the marriage she earned a B.F.A. from the Art Institute of Chicago.

After traveling in Europe for a year, Lozano moved to New York City to pursue a career as an artist. She had her first exhibition at the Bianchini Gallery in New York in 1966. Many of her early paintings and drawings were done in a raw expressionistic style. Her so-called "comix" often featured hand-held tools embellished to resemble genitalia or positioned in a suggestive manner. These images were sometimes accompanied by provocative texts and sexual innuendos. Lozano's art of this period is often compared to early works by Claes Oldenburg and late works by Philip Guston. In the late 1960s, she experimented with a more Minimalist aesthetic, creating monochromatic Wave paintings based on the physics of light.

=== Career as a conceptualist ===
Like many of her contemporaries, including Adrian Piper and Vito Acconci, Lozano began to pursue conceptual art projects starting in the mid-1960s. In February 1969 she commenced her General Strike Piece, in which she withdrew from the New York art world. Her instructions to herself were as follows: GRADUALLY BUT DETERMINEDLY AVOID BEING PRESENT AT OFFICIAL OR PUBLIC "UPTOWN" FUNCTIONS OR GATHERINGS RELATED TO THE "ART WORLD" IN ORDER TO PURSUE INVESTIGATIONS OF TOTAL PERSONAL AND PUBLIC REVOLUTION. EXHIBIT IN PUBLIC ONLY PIECES WHICH FURTHER SHARING OF IDEAS & INFORMATION RELATED TO TOTAL PERSONAL AND PUBLIC REVOLUTION. In April 1969, Lozano began her Grass and No-Grass pieces, in which she smoked and abstained (semi-successfully) from marijuana every day for several weeks at a time. In 1969 Lee's work was published in 0 to 9 magazine, an avant-garde journal which experimented with language and meaning-making.

In August 1971, she began another notorious work of refusal, Decide to Boycott Women. What began as a one-month experiment intended to improve communication with women wound up as a twenty-seven year hiatus from speaking or otherwise relating to them. Her systematic rejection of all members of her own gender lasted for the remainder of her life; she effectively cut off ties with friends, fellow artists, gallerists, and other women who had been long-time supporters of her art, including the feminist curator and art critic Lucy Lippard. Art historian and critic Helen Molesworth has suggested that these two conceptual works signaled Lozano's simultaneous rejection of capitalism and patriarchy.

== Notable works ==
Lee Lozano's Tool Paintings is a series of paintings of screwdrivers, bolts, wrenches, clamps, and hammers, anthropomorphized so that they appear to be in sexualized motion. She began painting objects that identified with male power and productivity in 1963.

In 1967, the artist made a list of her titles of paintings called ‘ALL VERBS: REAM, SPIN, VEER, SPAN, CROSS, RAM, PEEL, CHARGE, PITCH, VERGE, SWITCH, SHOOT, SLIDE, JUT, HACK, BREACH, STROKE, STOP’. Her list is in advance of Richard Serra's ‘Verb List Compilation: Actions to Relate to Oneself’ from 1967 to 1968. The paintings were compositions of edges and spirals in greyscale.

Untitled (General Strike Piece), begun in 1969, in which she cut herself off from the commercial art world; and Boycott Piece, which began in 1971, as a month-long experiment intended to improve communication but became a permanent "boycott" of speaking to or directly interacting with women. She notes that “Dropout Piece is the hardest work I have ever done."

== Final years ==
After being evicted from her studio loft on Grand & Green Street in SoHo, Lozano moved uptown to St. Nicholas Avenue until she moved to her parents' house in Dallas, Texas in 1982, culminating yet another project (Drop Out). She continued to pursue private conceptual projects, including Masturbation Investigation and Dialogue Piece, but fell into relative obscurity until the late 1990s, when she was diagnosed with inoperable cervical cancer. She was persuaded to allow several concurrent exhibitions of her work, three at SoHo galleries and one at the Wadsworth Atheneum, which revived her legacy just before her death in 1999 at the age of 68.

Interviewed in 2001, Lucy Lippard noted that "Lee was extraordinarily intense, one of the first, if not the first person (along with Ian Wilson) who did the life-as-art thing. The kind of things other people did as art, she really did as life—and it took us a while to figure that out."

== Bibliography ==
- Michelle Pirano, Target Practice: Painting Under Attack 1949–78. Seattle, WA: Seattle Art Museum, 2009.
- James Kalm, "Brooklyn Dispatches: Resurrection of a Bad-Ass Girl, Part I", in The Brooklyn Rail (November 2008).
- Helen Molesworth, ed., Solitaire: Lee Lozano, Sylvia Plimack Mangold, Joan Semmel. Columbus, OH: Wexner Center for the Arts, 2008.
- Lisa Gabrielle Mark and Elizabeth Hamilton, eds., WACK! Art and the Feminist Revolution. (exh. cat) London: MIT Press/Los Angeles: MoCA, 2007.
- Klaus Biesenbach, ed., Into Me/Out of Me. (exh. cat.) Ostfildern: Hatje Cantz, 2007.
- Barry Rosen, Jaap van Liere, and Gioia Timpanelli, Lee Lozano Drawings. New Haven, CT: Yale University Press, 2006.
- Cheryl Donegan, "All Weapons Are Boomerangs", in Modern Painter (October 2006), pp. 76–79.
- Helen Molesworth, "Tune In, Turn On, Drop Out: The Rejection of Lee Lozano," in Lee Lozano: Win First Don't Last/Win Last Don't Care, ed. Adam Szymczyk. Kunsthalle Basel and Van Abbemuseum, 2006.
- Sabine Folie and Gerald Matt, Lee Lozano. Seek the extremes… (exh. cat.) Nürnberg: Verlag für moderne Kunst Nürnberg, 2006
- Bruce Hainley, "On 'E'", Frieze, October 2006, pp. 242–247.
- John Perreault, "Lee Lozano at P.S. 1", Artopia: John Perreault's art diary, an ArtsJournal blog, March 2004. LEE LOZANO AT P.S.1 | Artopia
- Katy Siegel, On the Legacy of Artist Lee Lozano-Interview in Artforum (October 2001), pp. 120–128.
- Roberta Smith, "Lee Lozano, 68, Conceptual Artist Who Boycotted Women for Years," New York Times, October 18, 1999.
- Kinmont, Ben (ed.), "Project Series: Lee Lozano", New York: Agency [Antinomian Press], [14 February] 1998.
