= Larry Zox =

American painter (1937–2006)

- Born: May 31, 1937; Des Moines, Iowa
- Died: December 16, 2006 (aged 69); Colchester, Connecticut
- Known for: Abstract Painting, colorist
- Movement: Abstract Expressionism, Color Field painting, Geometric abstraction and Lyrical Abstraction
- Awards: 1967 Guggenheim Fellowship

Lawrence "Larry" Zox (May 31, 1937 – December 16, 2006) was an American painter and printmaker who is classified as an Abstract expressionist, Color Field painter, a Lyrical Abstractionist, and a Hard Edge painter although he did not readily use those categories for his work.

== History ==
Zox was born in Des Moines, Iowa to Oscar and Mildred (née Friedman) Zox, but moved to New York City at an early age. He lived an artist's life, running in the circles of many prominent names in the art world. In recent years he had relocated to his second home in Colchester, Connecticut. Zox was considered an abstract artist, but more often he described himself as a colorist.

Zox received his education at the University of Oklahoma and Drake University. He studied with George Grosz at the Des Moines Art Center. He was awarded a Guggenheim Fellowship and received grants from the National Endowment for the Arts and the Adolph and Esther Gottlieb Foundation. He was Artist-in Residence at the University of North Carolina at Greensboro, Dartmouth College, and Yale University.

His work has been exhibited in many one-person and group shows including the Whitney Museum of American Art (New York City); the Museum of Modern Art (NY); Albright-Knox Art Gallery (Buffalo, New York); Art Institute of Chicago; Museum of Fine Arts, Boston; and Solomon R. Guggenheim Museum (NY). In recent years his work has been exhibited at the Stephen Haller Gallery and the Berry Campbell Gallery in New York City and Rocket Gallery, London. His estate is represented by Berry Campbell Gallery.

He died, aged 69, from cancer and was survived by his second wife, the former Virginia King, his two children from his first marriage Alexander and Melinda, a brother Alan Zox, a sister Susan Zox-Smith, and his brother-in law, the painter David R. Prentice among others.

== Selected public collections ==
- Museum of Modern Art, New York, NY
- Whitney Museum of American Art, New York, NY
- Metropolitan Museum of Art, New York, NY
- Tate Modern, London, United Kingdom
- Hirshhorn Museum and Sculpture Garden, Washington, DC
- Neues Museum Weserburg Bremen, Bremen, Germany
- Museum of Fine Arts, Boston, Boston, Ma
- Fogg Art Museum, Harvard University, Boston, MA
- Museum of Fine Arts, Houston, Houston, TX
- Dallas Museum of Fine Arts, Dallas, Tx
- Des Moines Art Center, Des Moines, IA
- Allen Memorial Art Museum, Oberlin College, Oberlin, OH
- Indianapolis Museum of Art, Indianapolis, IN
- Portland Art Museum, Portland, OR
- Addison Gallery of American Art, Andover, MA
- Herbert F. Johnson Museum of Art, Cornell University, Ithaca, NY
- Boca Raton Museum of Art, Boca Raton, FL
- Brooklyn Museum of Art, Brooklyn, NY
- Solomon R. Guggenheim Museum, New York, NY
- Governor Nelson A. Rockefeller Empire State Plaza Art Collection, Albany, NY
