= Peter Reginato =

American sculptor and painter (born 1945)

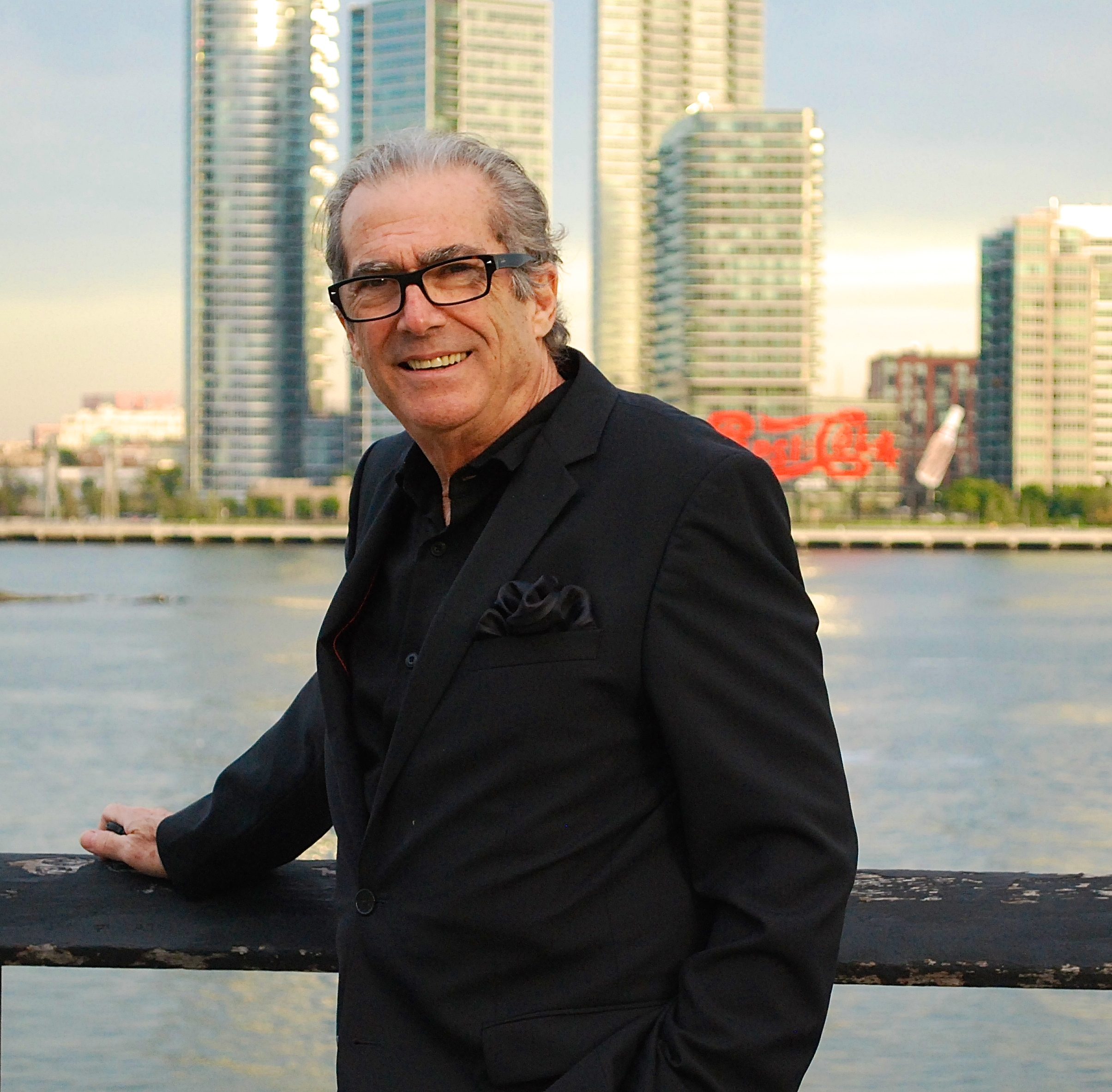
- Peter Reginato (2014)
- Born: August 19, 1945 (age 81); Dallas, Texas, United States
- Education: San Francisco Art Institute
- Known for: Abstract sculpture Abstract painting

Peter Reginato (born August 19, 1945), is an American abstract sculptor and painter.

== Biography ==
Reginato was born on August 19, 1945, in Dallas, Texas, and grew up in Berkeley, California. He attended the San Francisco Art Institute, from 1963 to 1966.

After his first successful solo show in 1966 at the Open Theatre Gallery in Berkeley, where he showed mostly paintings, he decided he wanted to be a sculptor. He moved to New York City later that same year. In 1970 and in 1973, his work was included in the Whitney Biennial.

== Exhibitions ==
His work has been shown at:

- The Butler Institute of American Art, Youngstown, Ohio

== Collections ==
Reginato has work in the permanent collections of the following:

- Allen Art Center, Houston, Texas
- Brown University
- Corcoran Gallery of Art
- Hirshorn Museum and Sculpture Garden, Smithsonian Institution, Washington, D.C.
- IBM Corporation
- The John and Mable Ringling Museum of Art
- Mary and Leigh Block Museum of Art at Northwestern University
- Mead Art Museum, Amherst College, Massachusetts
- Metropolitan Museum of Art
- Mint Museum of Art
- Museum of Fine Arts, Boston
- Museum of Fine Arts, Houston

Sweetheart (2006), 74" x 66" x 71", welded stainless steel, photo by William Knipscher
