= David R. Prentice =

American painter

David R. Prentice (December 22, 1943–November 11, 2024) was an American artist.

Prentice was born in Hartford, Connecticut and studied at the Art School of the University of Hartford from 1962 to 1964, after which he worked for multiple esteemed artists including Jasper Johns, Robert Rauschenberg, Andy Warhol, Robert Motherwell, Helen Frankenthaler, Alexander Liberman and Malcolm Morley.

Prentice was an accomplished and internationally known landscape painter. He exhibited his work in the United States and Japan. During the 1960s Prentice was associated with Lyrical Abstraction and his work was exhibited at the Park Place Gallery in New York City among other places.
