= Ib Benoh =

American artist

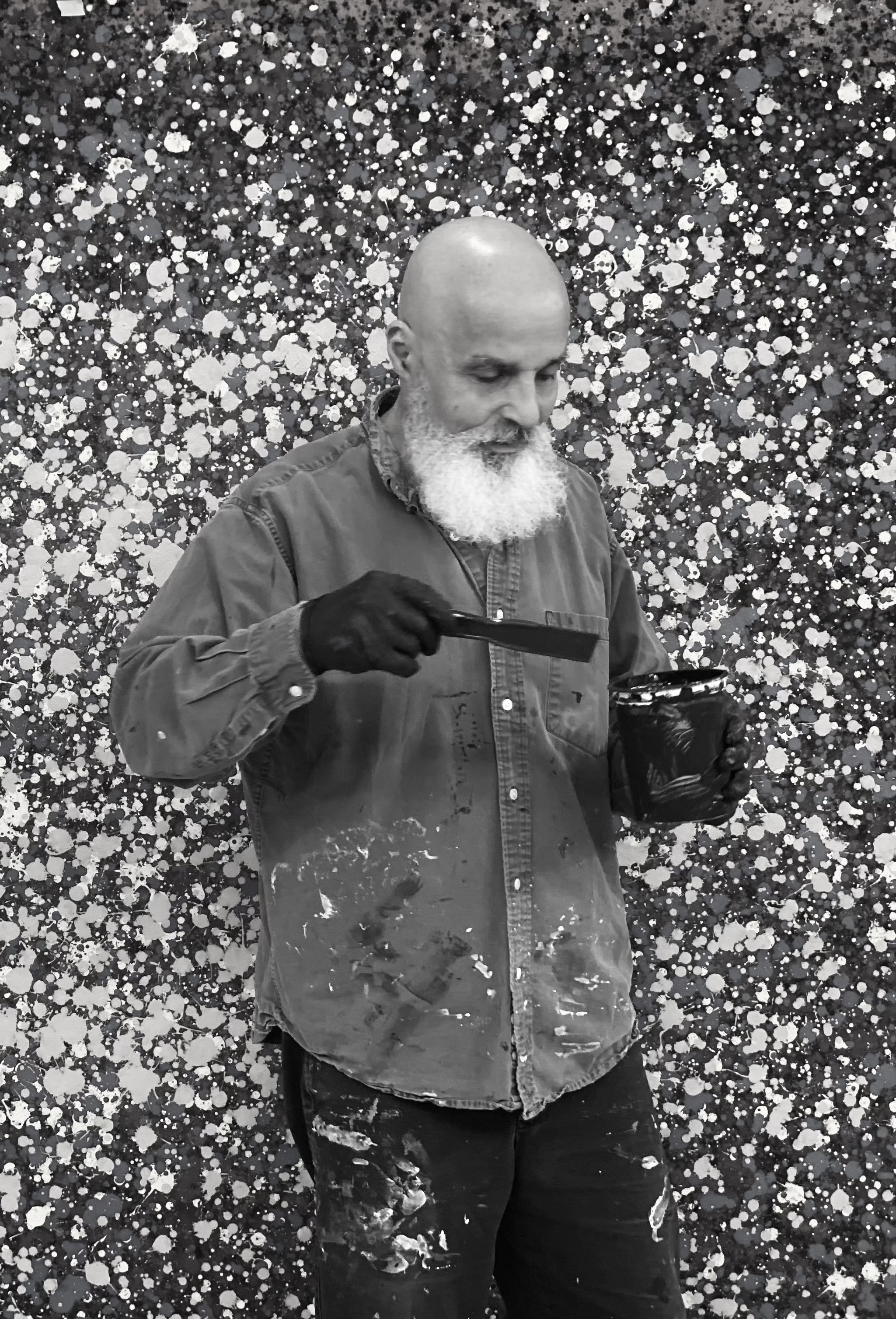
- Ib Benoh in 2020
- Born: Ibrahim Benoh
- Alma mater: Rhode Island School of Design, New York University,

Ib Benoh (né Ibrahim Benoh) is an American multidisciplinary artist of Syrian-Libyan descent. Benoh's lifelong efforts to break the confines of geographical, cultural, and social boundaries, as he lived across four continents, seeking personal freedom and redefining identity, gave way to a wide range of works. He has worked in painting, sculpture, drawing, two- and three-dimensional construction, traditional and digital printmaking, digital media, poetry, critical writing, and scholarly research.

Since his early artistic life, Benoh exhibited extensively. He had solo and group shows in the Middle East, North Africa, Italy, and the United States, including New York City where he was recognized by Betty Parsons in 1980. Though he left the art market in 1988, Benoh continued focusing on experimental work that led to his breakthrough approach to painting and digital media.

Benoh's early exposure to the way of Infinity, the Sufi practice of oneness that transcends artificial divisions — along with reading extensively on the various philosophical thoughts of the ancient and contemporary scientific approach to understanding oneself and our world — fueled his work over the years. Ideas within the realm of infinity seeped into his work, such as interconnectedness, transformation, regeneration, continuity, variations, boundlessness, expansiveness, motion, timelessness, weightlessness, and nothingness. He creates harmony between the visual and the poetic as his artworks develop simultaneously with his poems.

== Early life ==
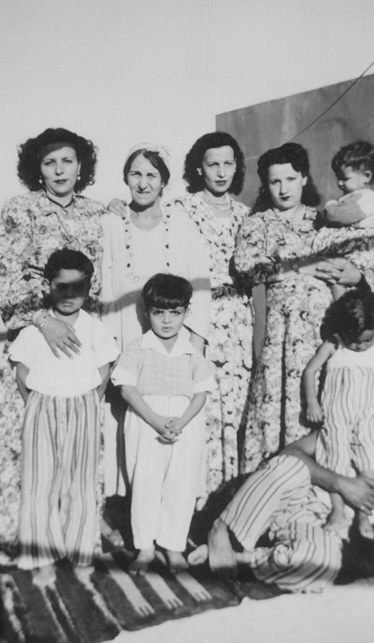
The artist, center, in front of his quilt-maker maternal grandmother, Damascus, ca1952.

Benoh’s parents were Syrian of Libyan descent. His mother, Afifa Abi Al Haj, was a privately educated homemaker. His father, Hasan Bin Nuh, served under Glubb Pasha in the Jordanian Arab Legion. Benoh spent part of his early years in Amman before the family returned to Damascus, where his father assumed the role of overseeing aircraft parts and logistics at a military air base.

Benoh’s paternal grandfather, Ibrahim Bin Nuh, after whom he was named, was an olive oil producer and headmaster of a high school in Khoms, Libya. He died not long after fleeing his homeland to evade capture by the Italian invaders for his role in funding the resistance.

Though his family lived in humble surroundings, Benoh had a culturally vibrant upbringing, one filled with art, poetry, music, literature, and storytelling. His mother often played the oud and sang during family gatherings. One of his earliest memories includes spending Thursday evenings watching and imitating the Sufis next door as they chanted and performed ritual spinning.

Growing up, Benoh exhibited a ferocious appetite for literature. He had access to the personal library of his late maternal grandfather, Adeeb Abi Al Haj, a judge, who left behind a notable collection that included handwritten and hand-illustrated volumes. Benoh dedicated time each day after school to self-education, reading extensively on a wide range of subjects, including medicine, science, regional and international law, the three Abrahamic religions, Hinduism, Buddhism, poetry, and the philosophical works of Sufi thinkers and other intellectuals.

In addition to reading, Benoh devoted much of his time during his teenage years to writing, drawing, and painting. He wrote short stories, plays, poetry, as well as personal reflections and observations. Benoh often painted outdoors on the banks of the Barada River, using its water to hydrate his watercolor paints, and developed a personal ritual of sending his finished paintings downstream, watching as his artwork gradually disappeared.

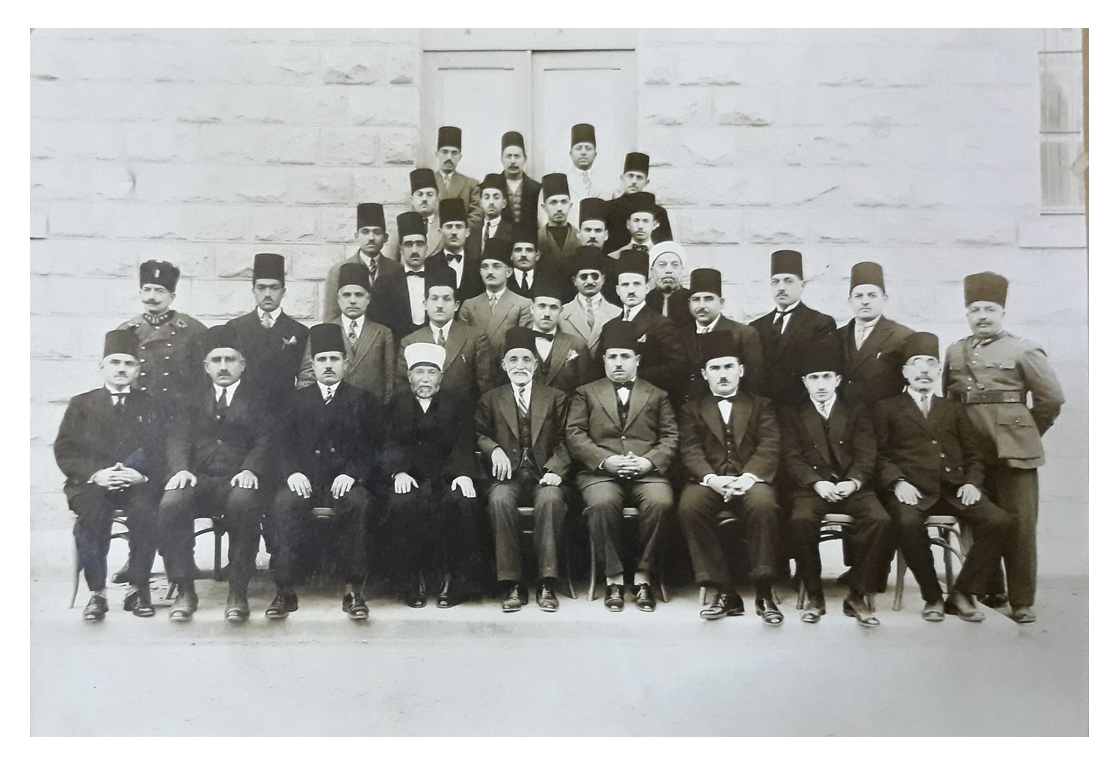
Judge Adeeb Abi Al Haj, head of the higher court, Ib Benoh's maternal grandfather, front row center with the Court of Appeal Committee, Damascus, Syria, 1931.

Benoh grew up in a family of artists. His maternal grandmother created quilts. She involved him in gathering scrap fabrics from friends and family and had him select the cut pieces for her designs. Benoh’s maternal uncle Mahmoud Jalal was a respected artist in the region. Growing up, Benoh dreamt of traveling to Rome to study at the art academy just like his uncle and cousin Khaled Jalal had done before him.

As his appetite for learning new skills grew, Benoh actively sought instruction. Not finding a local source, he enrolled in a mail correspondence program with an art school in Paris. His first major purchase with his allowance was a book on Renaissance art, his prized possession, which he cherished and diligently studied. Adding to his daily independent activities, Benoh began dabbling with clay sculpting. His insatiable appetite for growing his artistic skills was finally satisfied when he enrolled at a newly established art center in downtown Damascus.

== Early sculptures and exhibitions ==
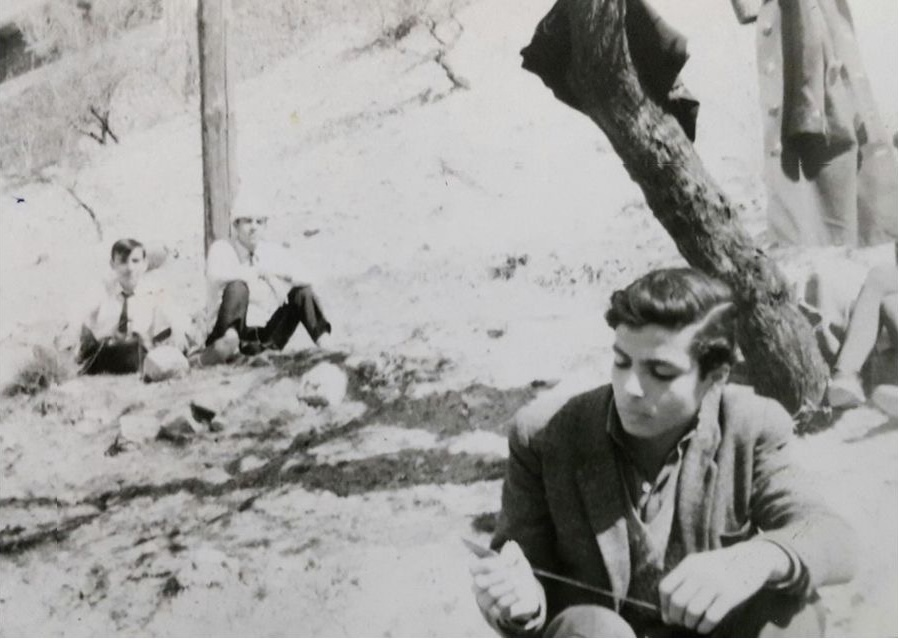
Ib Benoh in Maaloula, Syria ca.1963. Field trip with members of the art center of Damascus.

At thirteen, Benoh began his formal artistic training in sculpture and drawing at the Center of Fine Arts of Damascus, where volunteer instructors were art faculty from the Damascus University, including Nassir Shoura, Aziz Ismail, Ghyath al-Akhras, Abdulsalam Kattramis, and Benoh’s uncle Mahmoud Jalal. The art center became Benoh’s home away from home for the next eight years. Inevitably, he made friends with the maintenance man who would unlock the doors for him to work on his sculptures at odd hours. Seeing his dedication, the center eventually allocated one room for Benoh to work on large-scale sculptures independently. Benoh was introduced to Western classical music as he sculpted and drew from life at the center.

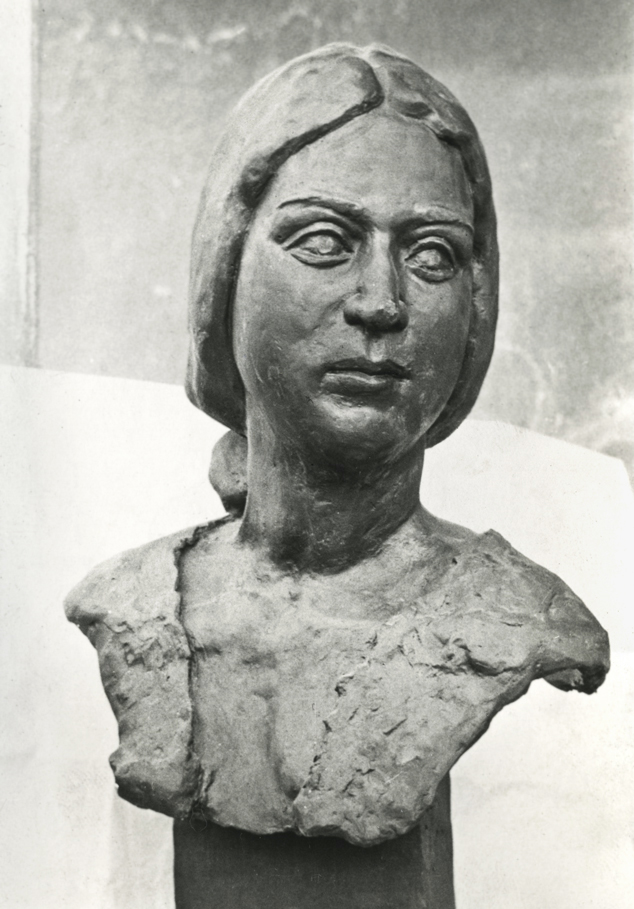
Female bust, plaster sculpture 1965-1966

While maintaining his love for Arabic literature, Benoh also discovered works by international writers and read Leo Tolstoy, Victor Hugo, and Ernest Hemingway extensively, as well as existentialists like Jean-Paul Sartre and Simone de Beauvoir.

During the years of his academic training at the art center, Benoh participated in yearly group exhibitions held by the art centers of major cities in Syria, including a 1968 group show with one of his larger-than-life sculptures exhibited at the National Museum of Damascus. As a practicing artist, he gained membership at the Damascus Artists Association of Fine Arts in 1971.

In 1970 Benoh was offered a prestigious sculpture commission for Damascus. With the help of four assistants who were masonries by trade, Benoh constructed a 13-meter enlarged relief replica of Assyrian Lion Hunts.

In his early twenties, Benoh was on his way to become one of the leading sculptors in the region. However, soon after completing the commission, Benoh left Syria to pursue other dreams.

Along with his interests and activities, Benoh’s interactions with mystics, artists, poets, and intellectuals in a free and politically unrestricted environment during the 50s and 60s in Damascus, laid the ground for his mature work ahead.

=== Public commission for the city of Damascus ===
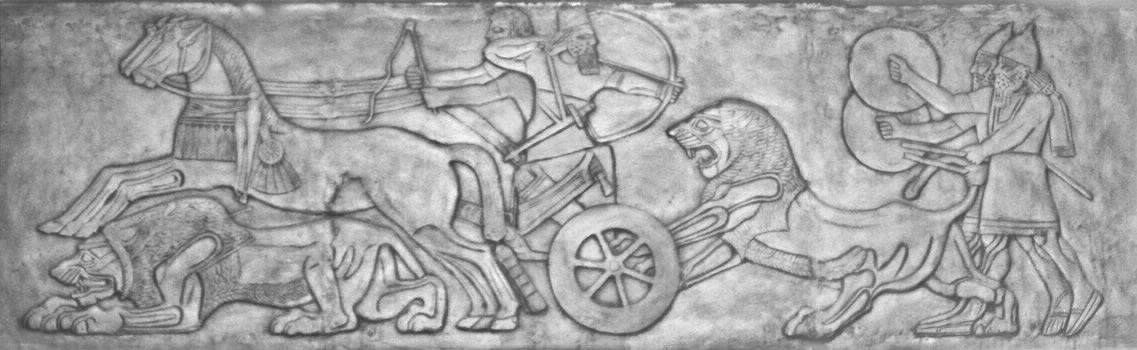
Enlarged replica of Assyrians hunting lions bas-relief, 1970.

== Self-exile ==
In his early twenties, Benoh seized an opportunity presented by the brief period of open borders during the Federation of Arab Republics — the short-lived union between Egypt, Syria, and Libya. Feeling trapped in an increasingly repressive Syria, he self-exiled to Libya, a one-way ticket and cardboard suitcase in hand. There, he reconnected with his family roots in Khoms and Tripoli and found community witnesses who had known his grandparents — a crucial step in securing Libyan citizenship. With that came his first passport. That document became a lifeline, allowing him to travel internationally. By the late 1970s, he had moved to the United States, where he later became a naturalized American citizen — his second passport and a new beginning.

== Early paintings and exhibitions ==
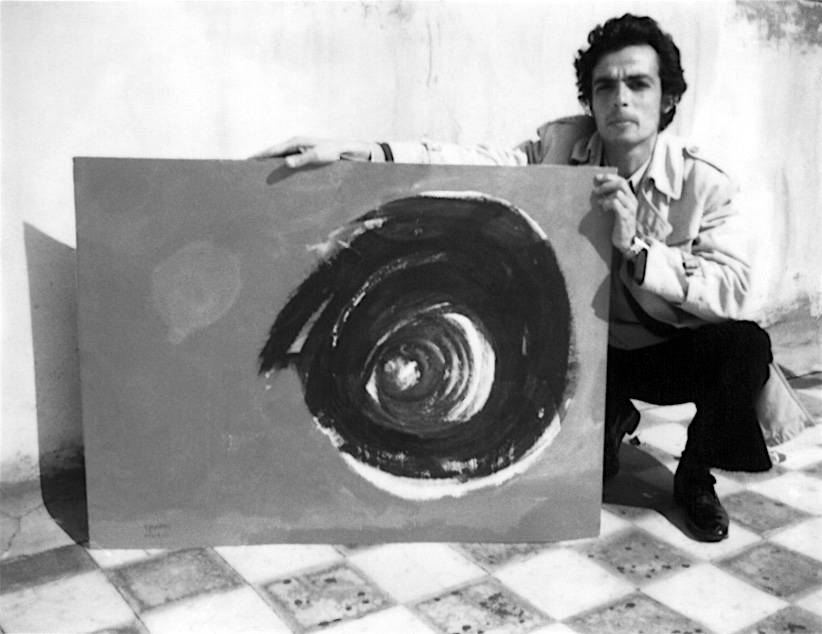
Ib Benoh with a painting in progress from 'The Sea' series, Tripoli, 1973

While in Libya, Benoh became active in the local art scene, working in the Unity of Fine and Plastic Arts department within the Ministry of Culture in Tripoli.

He sporadically published satirical cartoons and some of his written works. In his published contribution, "Truthfulness in Children's Art," written for the All Arts magazine, Benoh spoke of the overpowering directive methods in early art education having hindering effects on the natural creative act of a child.

Living in a new environment, filled with bright colors and North African light, Benoh fully engrossed himself in experimental painting in gouache and later acrylics. Fascinated with the openness of Tripoli to the Mediterranean Sea, he abstracted from life the ever-changing movement of the waves, capturing the energy of the natural elements through large brushstrokes. He participated in regional group exhibitions with his new paintings and represented Libya in significant art events outside the country. Years later, he would reflect that, at the time, he was unaware of Modern Art in America.

=== Selected works from 'The Sea' series: Tripoli ===
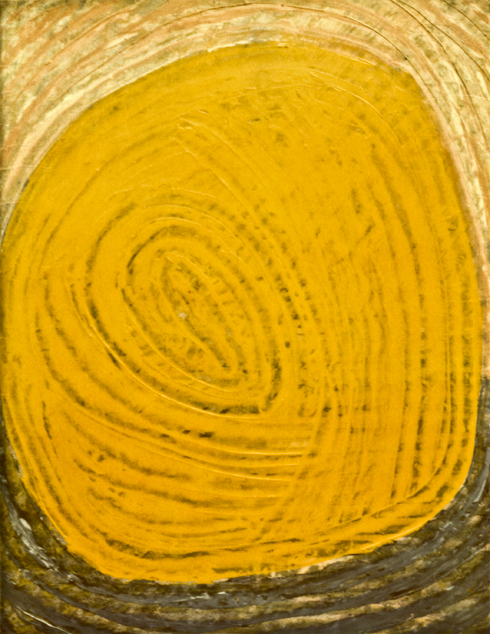
3rd Kuwait Exhibition 1973

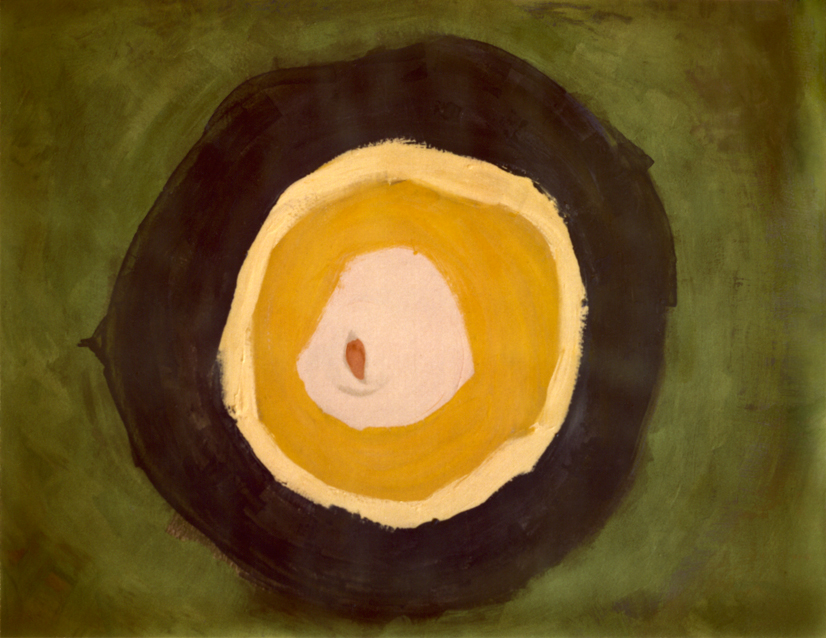
1972 - 1973

== Living in Rome and first solo exhibition ==
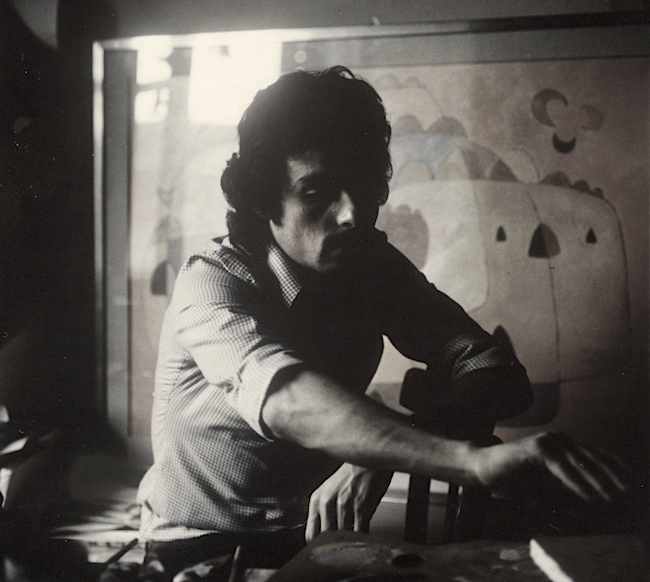
Ib Benoh in his Rome studio, 1974.

In 1973, Benoh finally fulfilled his lifelong dream of studying in Rome at the Academy of Fine Arts, where he studied under artist and professor Marcello Avenali.

While living in Rome for the next four years, Benoh produced paintings reminiscent of his joyful childhood, influenced by North African heritage and African light and colors. He exhibited these brightly contrasting works in his first solo show held in Rome.

During this period, Benoh painted at his studio and visited local cafes and restaurants to draw daily, sharing tables with oter artists, including painters, sculptors, filmmakers, and poets.

In his final year in Rome, Benoh published "L'Arte Infantile," his thesis, expanding on his affinity for the early stages of creative development from scribbling to the interruption of academic shaping.

=== Selected works from 'Dreaming of North Africa' series: Rome ===
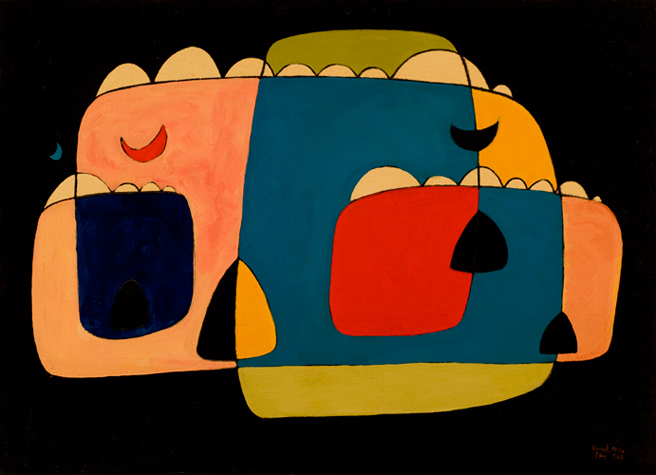
Untitled, 1975

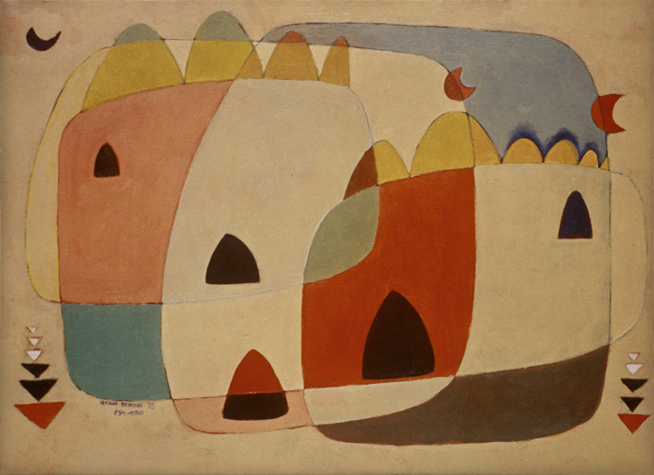
Untitled, 1975

== Coming to the United States and US debut solo show ==
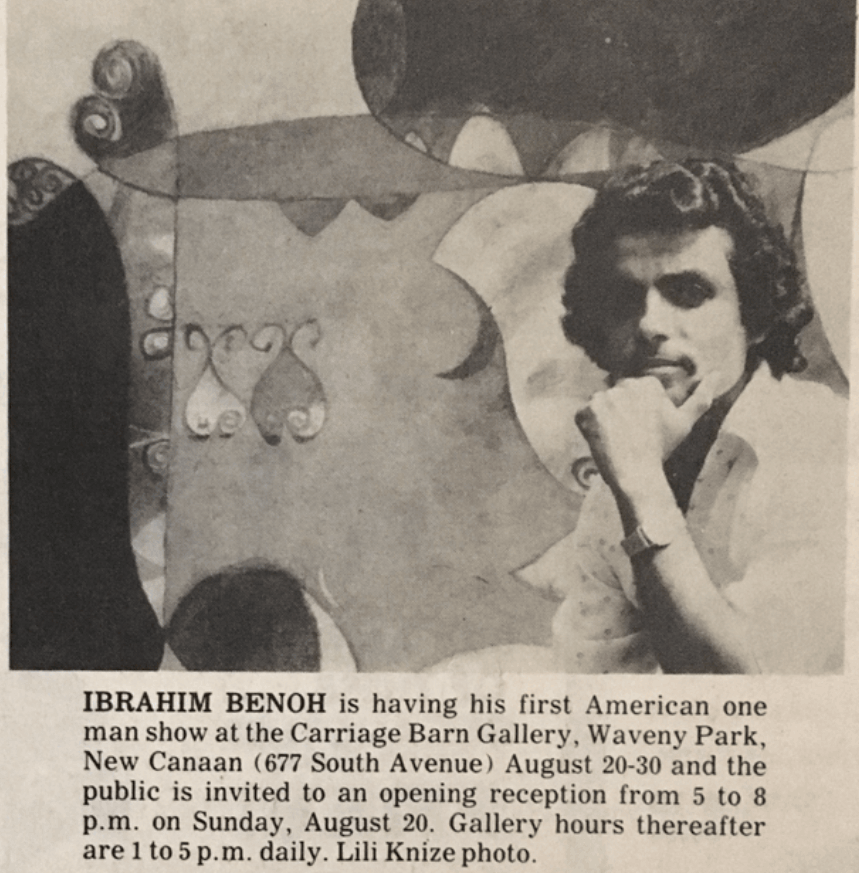
Benoh's US debut one-man show in New Canaan, 1978.

The following year, Benoh moved to the U.S. to live and study after being accepted into top art schools. He initially settled in New Canaan, Connecticut, painting daily in preparation for an upcoming solo show. Benoh's acrylic paintings on canvas rapidly took on a new direction. Complex abstracted imagery resembled a colorful dream world. He began incorporating written rhythmic, poetic statements into his ink drawings on paper. This new body of work, consisting of poetry-infused ink drawings and paintings of whorls of colors, was presented at his US debut solo show at Carriage Barn Gallery, New Canaan, Connecticut.

Benoh's lifelong concern is harmony between people, species, and the environment. Some of his earlier drawings contain handwritten meditative prose, incorporated into the design, one of which with the motto, "Don't kill the whales' in several versions in the tail of a representation of the sea mammal." Another of Benoh's one-line ink drawings depicts a hunchback, along with several variations of a poem that ask not to blame the hunchback for being a hunchback. The artist's paintings, shown accompanied by the drawings in his 1978 exhibition, "are expressive of Benoh's philosophy of universal love."

=== Selected works from US debut one-man show: New Canaan ===
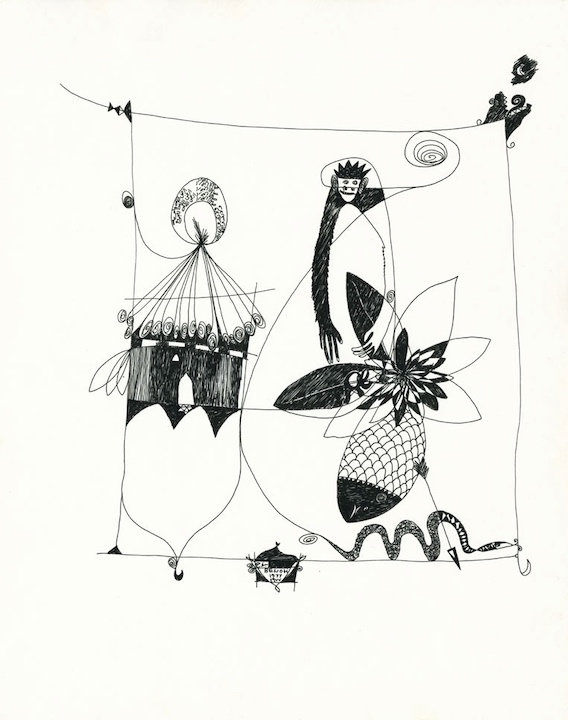
The Vast Land, 1977

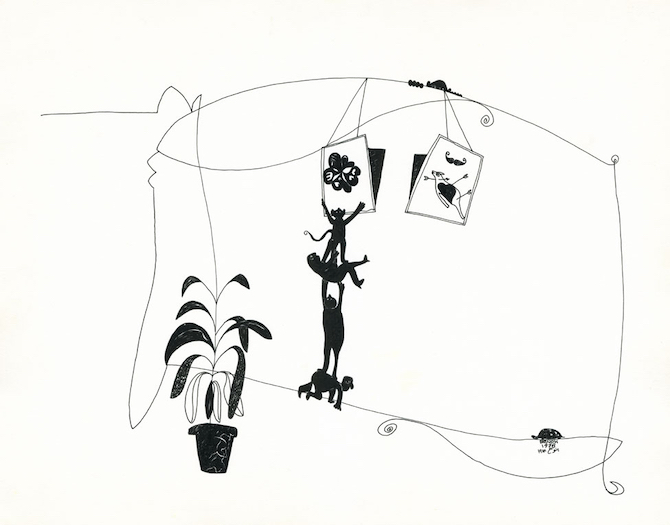
Exhibition Installation, 1978

== Moving to Rhode Island ==
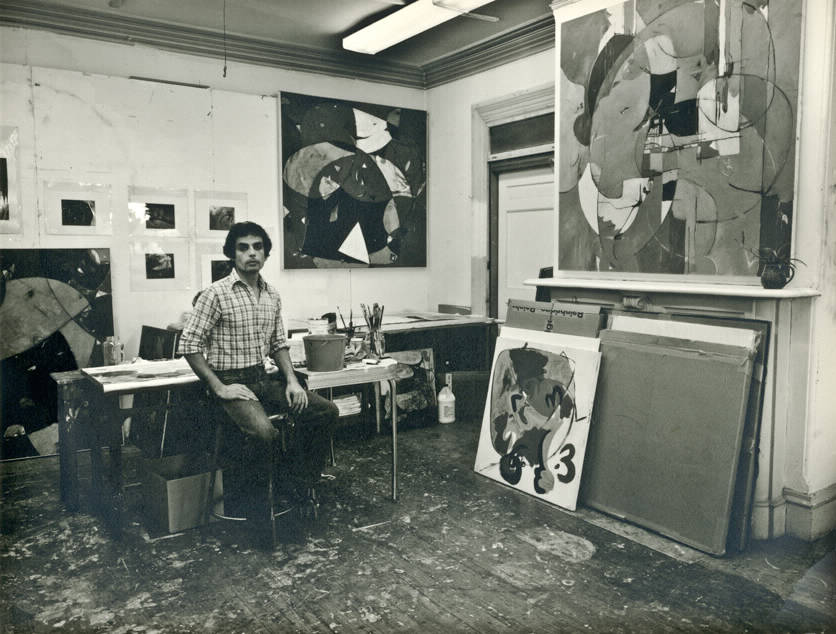
Ib Benoh at his Rhode Island School of Design studio, ca1979

In 1978, Benoh moved to Rhode Island when he decided to attend Rhode Island School of Design (RISD) graduate program.

During that time, Benoh further developed his artwork reflecting Eastern Perspective influence. His ink drawings combined with meditative prose became more elaborate. Spontaneous freehand calligraphic marks dominated his numerous monoprint series. Overlapping abstract shapes intertwined with the 'infinite line' filled his acrylic-on-canvas paintings.

He participated in a group show at the RISD Museum. Immediately upon earning his MFA in Painting, he had a solo exhibition of his paintings and monoprints at the RISD's Woods-Gerry Gallery. For the next several years, his paintings gradually went through stages of simplification.

Benoh began teaching art in 1979 at RISD's program and later at various colleges and universities in the US, UAE, and Kuwait, concluding with George Washington University, Washington, DC in 2010.

=== Selected works from 1980: Providence ===
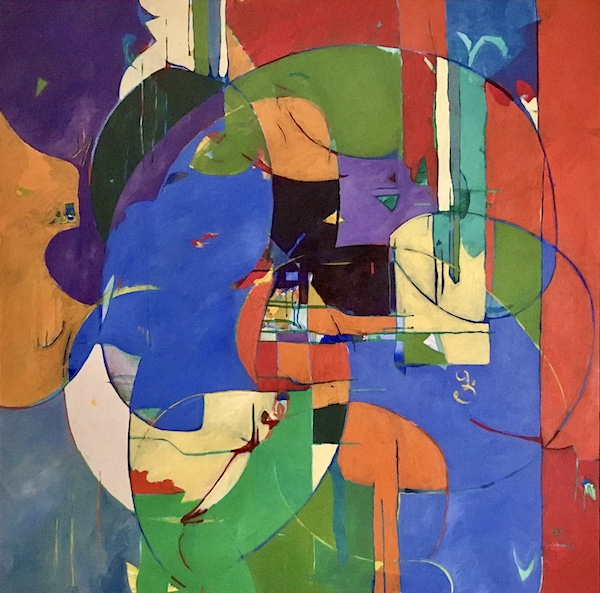
Untitled, 1980

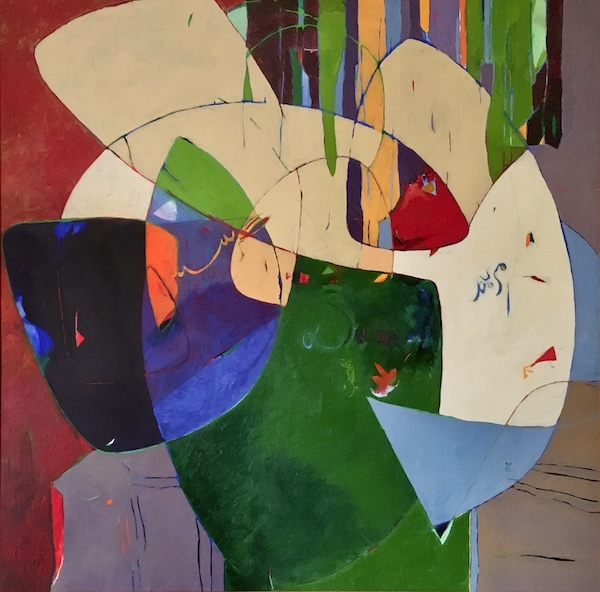
Untitled, 1980

== Benoh and Jack Youngerman: A Meeting of Minds ==
Benoh and Jack Youngerman formed a warm and meaningful friendship that began at the Rhode Island School of Design, where Youngerman, as a visiting artist, impressed Benoh with his kindness and authenticity. Having spent formative years in postwar Paris, Youngerman brought a deep understanding of abstraction, European modernism, and artistic discipline—qualities that resonated with Benoh. Their bond quickly grew over shared meals and discussions about art, life, and culture, forming the foundation of a lasting connection.

Their relationship became a bridge between generations of artists, deepening through mutual experiences of living in the Middle East and Europe and finding common ground in their perspectives on art and culture. In 1980, when Benoh was with the Betty Parsons Gallery, he moved to New York City, where he and Youngerman continued their deep conversations. Meeting often at Youngerman studio in The Village, they reflected on their personal histories and Youngerman’s stories of the New York School, with his insights offering both guidance and camaraderie.

Though life eventually led them apart, Benoh always cherished their friendship, describing Youngerman as a 'wonderful human being.' He mourned Youngerman’s passing as the loss of someone truly special, recognizing the enduring impact of their bond on his artistic journey.

== Joining the Betty Parsons Gallery ==
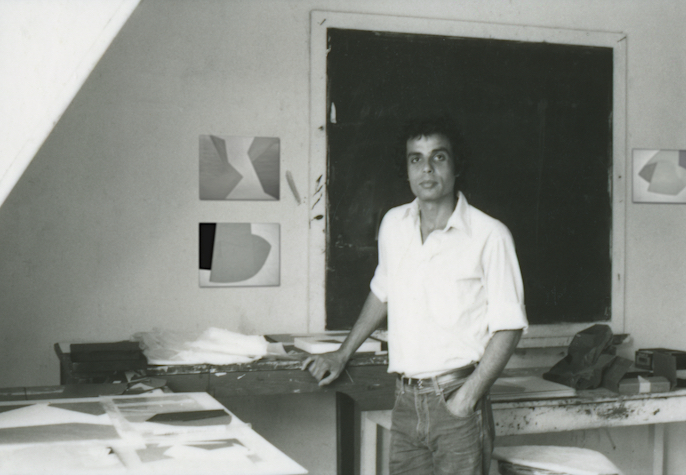
Ib Benoh at his Rhode Island School of Design summer teaching studio ca.1981

Upon completing his graduate studies in 1980, Benoh returned to New Canaan, spending his days at his new studio. Shortly after, he received a call from Lee Hall, the then-president of Rhode Island School of Design, offering an opportunity to work at the Betty Parsons Gallery in New York. Benoh accepted the position of Parsons’ assistant at her historic NY gallery without knowing anything about Parsons, a renowned gallerist and early promoter of abstract expressionism. Similarly, when Benoh began working at the gallery, Parsons wasn’t aware that Benoh was an artist. One morning, when Parsons was not at the gallery, Jack Tilton, the then gallery director, asked to see Benoh’s artwork that Benoh was taking to another gallery after work. Parsons walked in, saw the miniature paintings leaning against a desk, and exclaimed, “Marvelous, marvelous! Who is the artist?” Tilton pointed to Benoh with a smile. Parsons turned to Benoh and said, “And I thought you were a dancer!” Parsons immediately asked Tilton to take Benoh’s work on consignment, spoke of giving Benoh a solo show in the future, and included him in the 1980 Christmas group show alongside works by such artists as Richard Tuttle, Saul Steinberg, Hedda Sterne, Toko Shinoda, Robert Yasuda, and Kenzo Okada.

=== Selected works from 'Betty's Ocean' series: New York ===
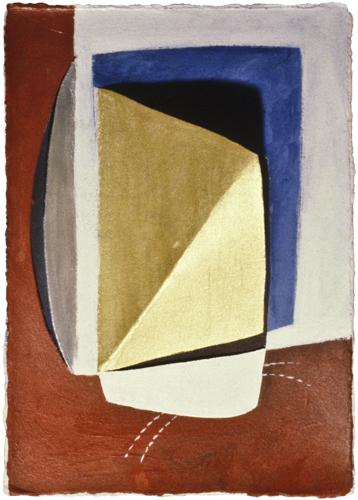
1980

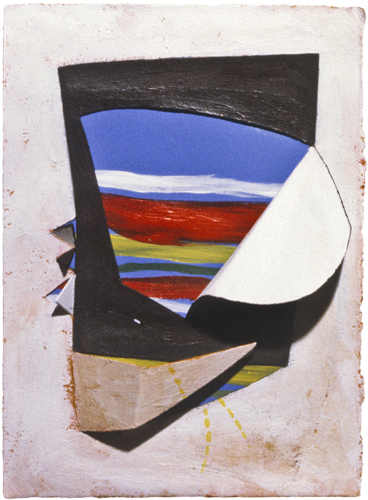
1981, Betty Parsons

Over time, Parsons and Benoh exchanged one another’s artworks. Parsons also acquired Benoh's miniature from a series of acrylic on cut-out paper, which Benoh named 'Betty's Ocean.'

For the first few months of working at Betty Parsons Gallery, Benoh utilized the daily train commute by producing various drawings. In his emotionally charged series, he reacted to an incident of a commuter suicide on the train tracks. Among his other series were his expressive mask-like drawings of boldly colored oil pastels on paper. Also, on the train, he completed several collections of broken and continuous lines on paper in ink and oil pastels.

=== Selected works from the train collections: New York ===
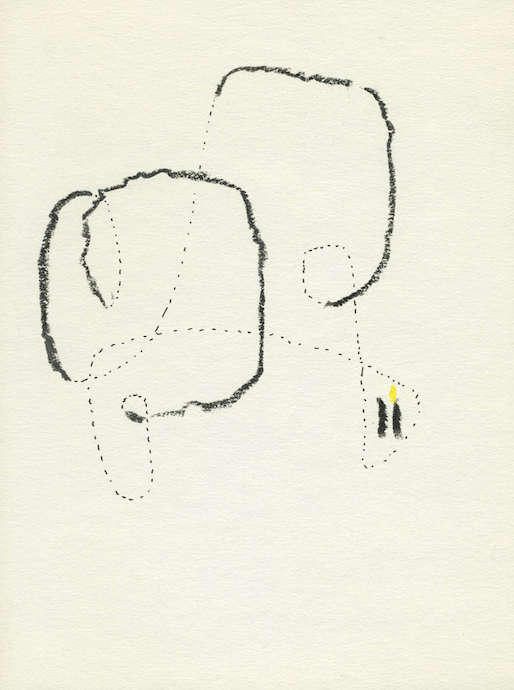
Number 8, 1980

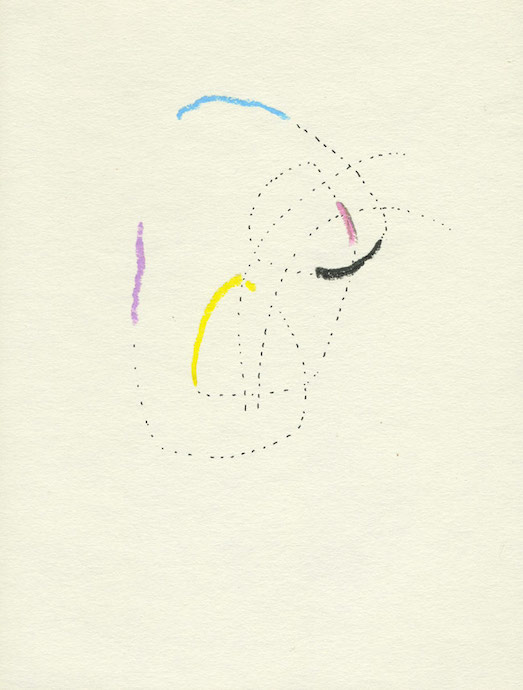
Number 7, 1980

Soon after taking up residency in New York City and only leaving the city during the summers to teach painting at Rhode Island School of Design, Benoh began experimenting with a minimalist use of space in his artwork. These experiments resulted in a series of hard-edge geometric compositions of oil and acrylic on partly peeled cardboard evocative of the city’s compacted, energetic urban life and architecture.

=== Selected works from Urban Dialog series: New York ===
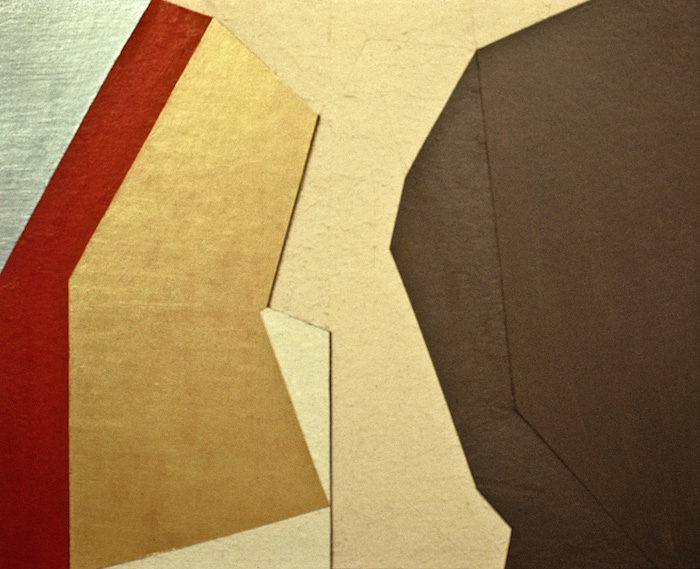
Untitled, 1981

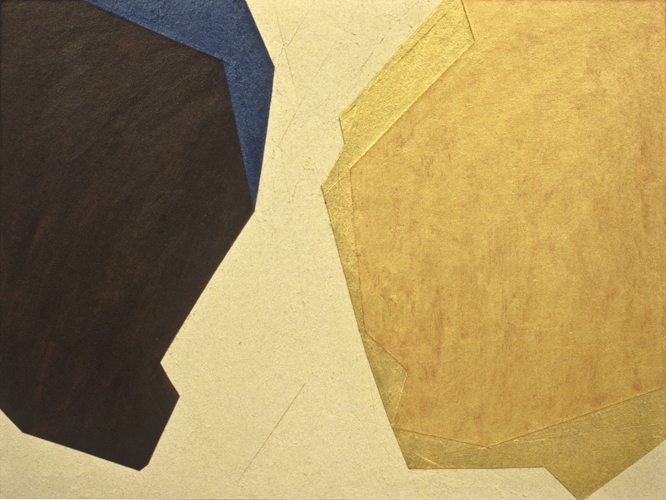
Untitled, 1981

== William Francis Gallery - Providence ==
While still with the Betty Parsons Gallery, Benoh gained representation with the William Francis Gallery in Providence, RI, where Benoh presented his new geometric work in a solo show. Kim Clark of The New Paper reviewed the 1981 exhibition, stating that “Benoh, like the Cubists, is concerned with dimensionality - the timeless conundrum of transforming three dimensions to a two-dimensional surface.” The artist “manipulates our perception of different colors so that what looks deep is sometimes shallow, and vice versa."

== Interior Design Project - Riyadh ==
In 1982, Benoh left New York for five months to assist Prince Faysal Al-Sudairy and his partner Paul Borghi, a dealer of Orientalist paintings, in establishing a new gallery, the Shada Gallery, in Riyadh, Saudi Arabia, as well as designing the interior of an office building space. Alongside his daily work-related activities, Benoh expressed his longing to return to New York in his drawing series “Flying Kites.” Benoh kept in touch with Betty Parsons and looked forward to establishing a new studio in New York City upon his return. He planned to begin working on a new body of work and continue his discussions with Parsons regarding a solo show at her gallery. Before returning to the U.S., Benoh traveled to Rome, Paris, and Nancy by train. On his trip, he produced linear oil pastel drawings of the stretch of the French landscape. However, upon his return to New York, he was stunned to hear of Parsons’ passing.

Soon after attending Parsons’ memorial, Benoh was included in a group show by Jack Tilton in his new gallery, which Tilton established in place of Betty Parsons Gallery. Later, Benoh reflected on his experience with Betty Parsons as having a significant impact on him. In Benoh’s words, “Betty had a keen eye for art and a good heart for artists.” Both, Parsons and Tilton, were most supportive and encouraging of Benoh as an artist.

== Second gallery representation in New York City ==
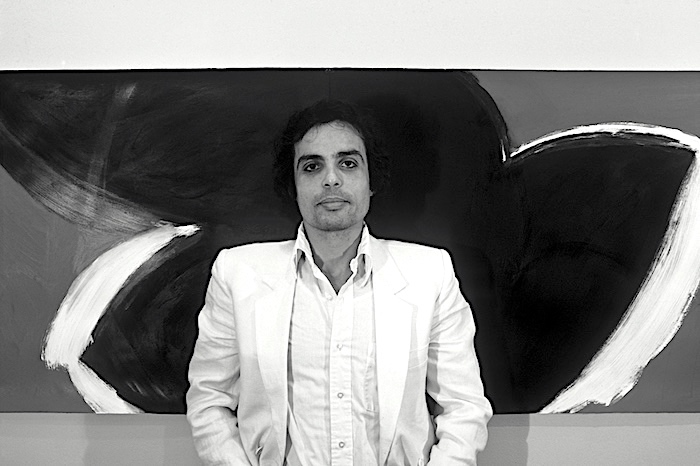
Ib Benoh, 1983, at his solo show at Tossan-Tossan Gallery, NYC.

In 1982 Benoh joined the Tossan-Tossan Gallery in New York, where he went on to have numerous solo and group shows as a gallery artist for the next six years. For his first solo show at the new gallery, Benoh painted a series of diptychs on paper with bold acrylic brushstrokes, creating enclosed organic shapes suggestive of voluptuous figures. Reviewer Claude LeSuer of ArtSpeak noted the three-dimensional effect in Benoh's two-dimensional work, "An almost sculptural quality is achieved by the way the pinned-down paper swells away from the wall, echoing the curve of painted forms."

== River Gallery - Westport ==
While still with the Tossan-Tossan Gallery, Benoh met art dealer Cele Scher. Benoh exhibited and had his work on consignment at Scher's River Gallery in Westport, Connecticut.

== Summers in Venice ==
While living in Rome in the late seventies, and after moving to the US, Benoh frequently returned to Venice, where he rented a large apartment as his art studio for the duration of the summer. However, his last summer there, in 1986, did not go as expected. Benoh went through a trying time of self-evaluation, during which he faced artist’s block. One day he ran into his friend from his earlier time in Rome, whom he would later refer to as Sufi; Wahid Magharbe with wife came to stay with Benoh to care for him. Soon Benoh was able to express his state of mind in a series of collages and small mixed media works, which included a self-portrait of a photographic image of himself taken at a photo booth, juxtaposed with pictures of Venice. Eventually, he had a breakthrough and began painting again. His friend documented the first moments of Benoh applying large strokes of paint onto large paper. That year Benoh exhibited his mixed-media artworks in a group show. In the year prior he participated with his experimental paintings in a group show.

=== Selected work from self-portrait series: Venice ===
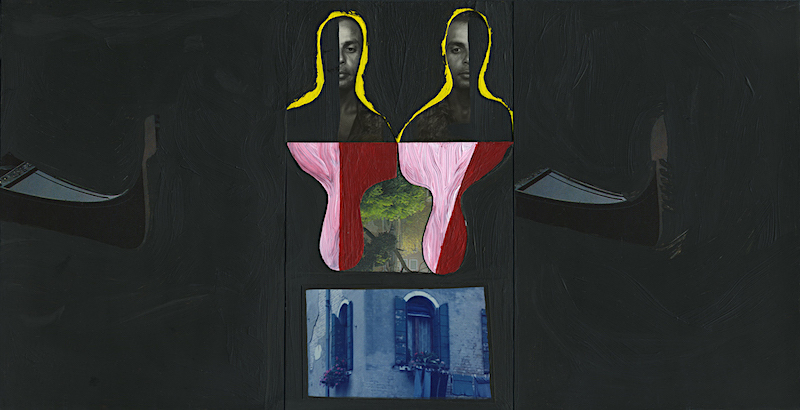
Two Halves of Venice (self-portrait), 1986

== Doctor of Arts ==
Benoh's relentless pursuit of reconciling objects within a flat picture plane persisted through the early 90s. He articulated this infinite continuum of shifting between dimensions in his published doctoral dissertation, An Examination Of The Process of Transforming Two Dimensional Constructions Into Three Dimensional Art Works, stating, “The six projects developed for this study explore spatial effects that take place in two and three-dimensional works in which constant shifting takes place between illusionistic and realistic space.” Benoh combined his martial arts practice with his interest in altering dimensionality in a series of visual experiments: transferring drawings on paper from life and constructions of photographic collages into four abstract serial rearrangeable sculptures of mat-board, wire, and plexiglass. Benoh earned his Doctor of Arts in Studio Art degree from New York University in 1993.

=== Selected works from D.A. visual projects: New York ===
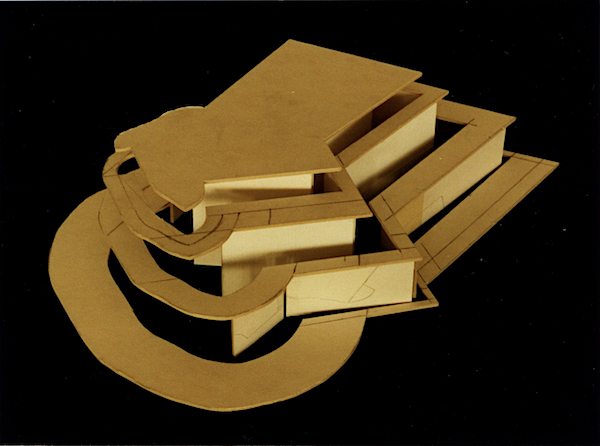
Project III, structure, one variation,1993

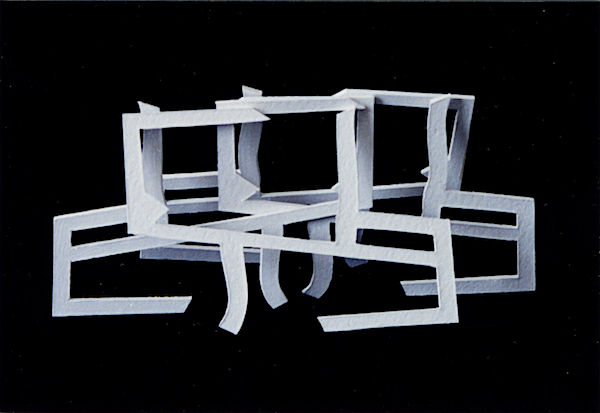
Project VI, structure, one variation, 1993

== Artwork based on his published doctoral dissertation ==
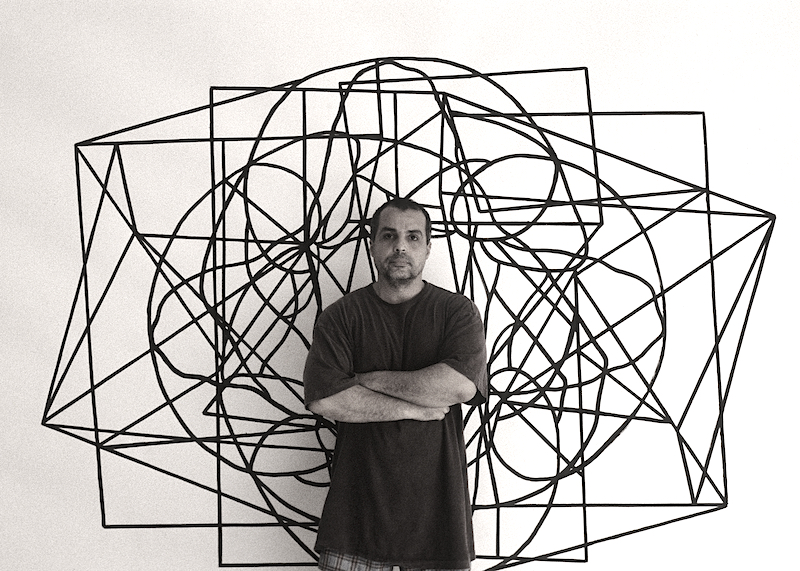
Ib Benoh, 1995

In the months following his dissertation's publication, while he was a professor of art in Kuwait City, Benoh began developing parts of the preceding visual projects in his Dimensional Transformation project. This four-part body of work, consisting of artworks of various mediums, was completed a year later, in 1996, at his summer studio in New York City and exhibited in Kuwait that same year. In the process, he enlarged the previously constructed five small pencil drawings into large drawings of acrylic on paper, which evolved into colorful geometric paintings of acrylic on canvas and further developed into architectural arrangements of spacial sculptures of acrylic on foam, concluding his project with mixed media constructions of acrylic on foam and wire. After two years in Kuwait, Benoh taught art courses for another two years in UAE at United Arab Emirates University before returning to the States.

=== Selected works from Dimensional Transformations: Kuwait and New York ===
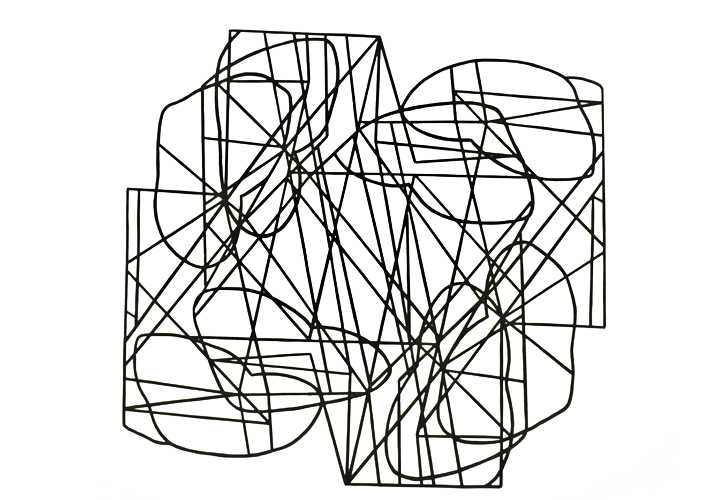
Part 1 - Drawing No.3, 1995

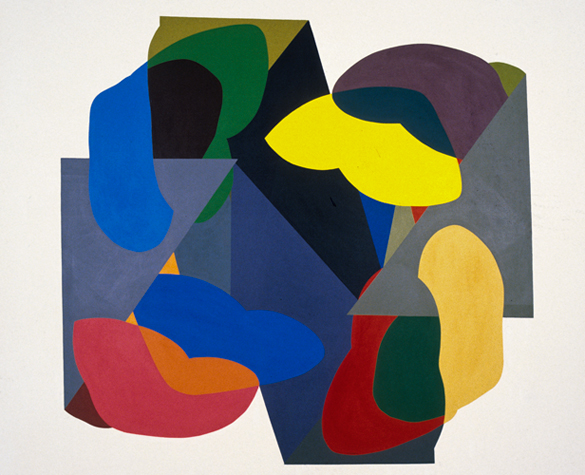
Part 2 - Painting No.3, 1995
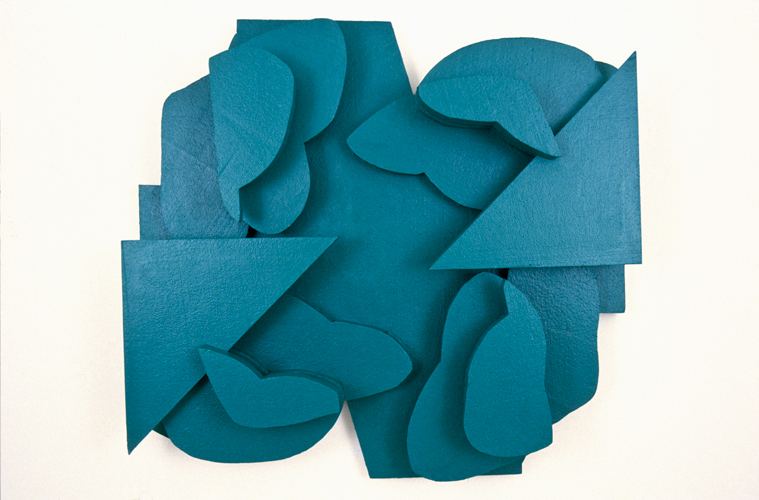
Part 3 - Construction No.3, 1996

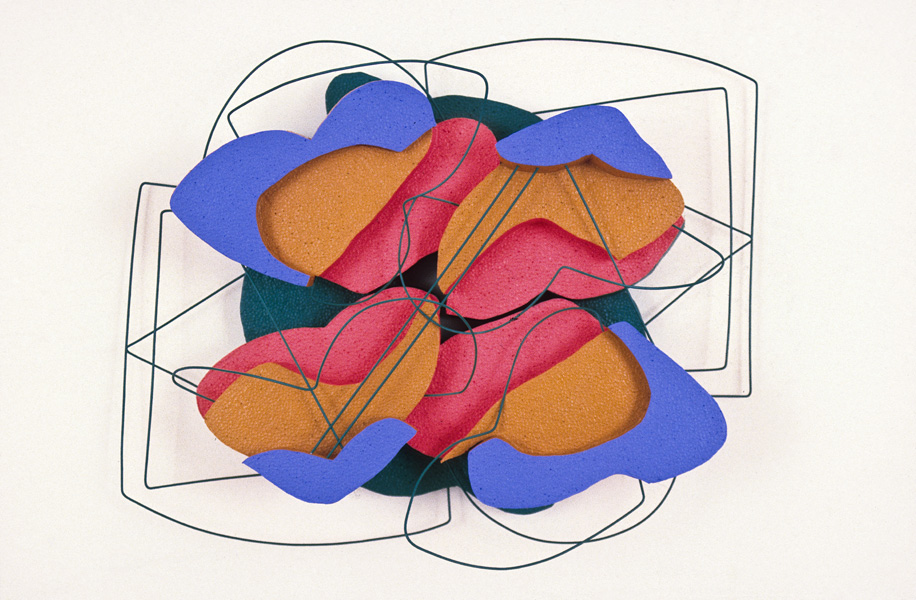
Part 4 - Construction No.3, 1996

== Moving to Upstate NY ==
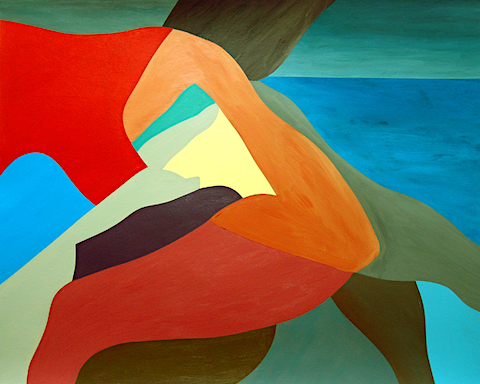
Constructing a Dam is Must, 2003 - 2004

In the late 90s, Benoh moved to upstate NY, where he maintained a studio and taught art and developed new art courses at the State University of New York at Broome Community College. For the next few years, he created small-scale paintings on paper that retained remnants of the preceding Dimensional Transformations project. Some aspects of the miniature works transcended into his large-scale acrylic on canvas painting, "Muse." The grand, mural-like work of lush, evocative brushstrokes, symbolic of excitement and optimism was exhibited in a group show and soon after in a solo installation at the Roberson Museum and Science Center.

=== Letting go of pure color ===
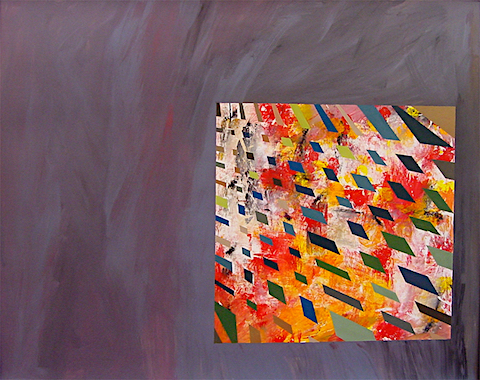
American Flag - Number 1, 2001

Benoh maintained using pure color in his paintings until the catastrophic event of the twin towers. In the early 2000s, Benoh began expressing anti-war sentiment in several major artworks, working in subdued tones.

In one of his most notable anti-war artworks, "End of a World" — a visceral acrylic on canvas of unsettling imagery of anguish, rendered in what the artist calls 'broken illusionism' — Benoh addressed the violence of war in the world, specifically the catastrophic attack on the twin towers and the inhumane destruction of Iraq that followed. In 2004, art historian Albert Boime wrote of Benoh's 'colossal panorama': "[Benoh's] post-Abstract Expressionist tendencies and Cubistic analysis here correspond to the negative impact of world events." The artist "insists on salvaging it by reclaiming it symbolically in a creative act." Benoh stated, "As an artist, I do not express my feelings to one part but all-disseminating a bit of this energy to everything I have come to know and beyond."

=== End of a World: Binghamton ===
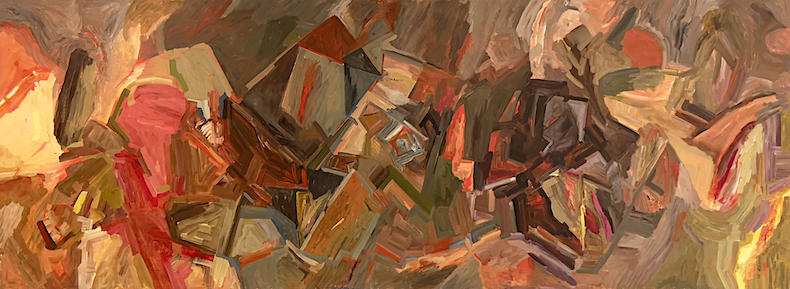
End of a World, 2003-2004, Barjeel Art Foundation, Sharjah, UAE

== Moving to Washington, DC ==
While teaching at George Washington University, Benoh completed his Breaking Boundaries, an installation of twenty-one paintings exhibited in 2006 at Roberson Museum and Science Center, Binghamton, NY. Benoh depicted a struggle between animal and human forms, alerting us to the dehumanization that stems from artificial divisions. Benoh shared that this work "was conceived when reflecting on the human tragedies that have befallen the world of late" and the "man-made conflicts of humans with their natural environment, with animals, with other humans, and within individuals themselves." Director of exhibitions, Peter Klosky observed Benoh's silhouetted human-animal compositions imparting "a sense of witnessing hidden intimacies as in the shadows cast upon a drawn shade." In his published statement, Benoh emphasized the need for humankind to create harmony between animals and other living organisms, stating: "Though humans dominate the world in many respects, we are still at the mercy of the laws of nature."

=== Breaking Boundaries installation project: Washington, DC ===
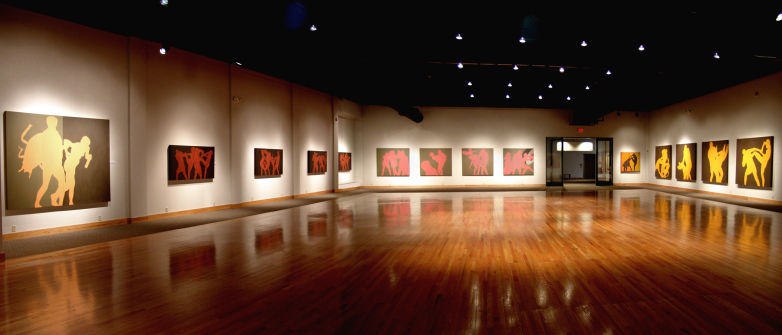
Solo exhibition, Roberson Museum, Binghamton, New York, 2006.

== Current work and regenerative dynamics ==
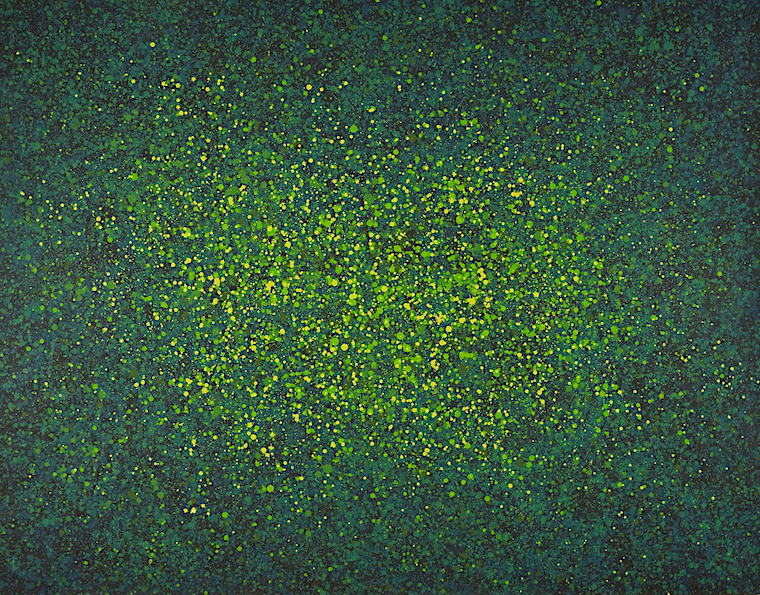
Beat in the Heart of Time, 5, 2017

In his current work, Benoh liberates canvases from the bounds of shapes and divisions within a painted space that dominated his paintings before this dramatic shift. Benoh facilitates the emergence of a space infinitely full of motion in his compacted and energetically-charged canvases. He creates harmony between the visual and the poetic as his large canvases develop simultaneously with his poems. The mutual energy of words and paint intertwine in a singular meditative process.

The seemingly serene painted variations of meditative qualities stem from his preceding emotionally charged painting series in response to ongoing wars and human conflict. In Benoh’s transformative paintings of today agony gave way to healing.

Benoh's poetic prose, "Vision of the Painter," accompanying his body of paintings by the same title, offers a glimpse into the artist's state of mind as he worked through uncertain yet exciting aspects of his newly developed regenerative painting process.

== Digital artwork and new media ==
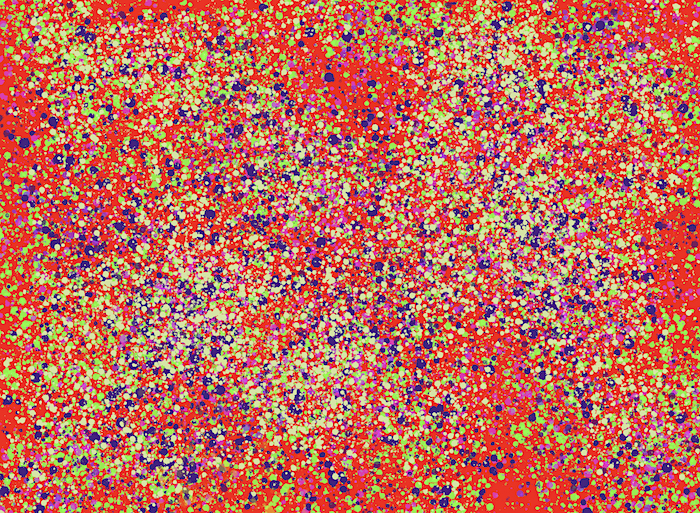
Timeless No.11, 2022

Once his groundbreaking canvas series began to take shape, Benoh integrated the inner workings of regenerative dynamics in his digital work evocative of infinity.

In one of his series of digital prints and new media, "Weightless," Benoh blurs the line between art and physics. When pondering the interplay of light and dark in his work, he states: "Weightless light and shadow are dynamic when in constant dialogue with motion. The shadow is the truth that triggers the imagination about the many possibilities of a hidden reality."
