= Beverly Buchanan =

African-American artist

- Born: October 8, 1940; Fuquay, North Carolina U.S.
- Died: July 4, 2015 (aged 74); Ann Arbor, Michigan U.S.
- Education: Bennett College; Columbia University; Art Students League
- Occupations: Painter; Sculptor; Photographer

Beverly Buchanan (October 8, 1940 – July 4, 2015) was an African-American artist whose works include painting, sculpture, video, photography, poetry, and land art. Buchanan is noted for her exploration of Southern vernacular architecture through her art.

== Early life and education ==
Buchanan was born on October 8, 1940 in Fuquay, North Carolina to Irene Rogers. Her parents divorced when she was young, and she was sent to live with her great-aunt and uncle, Marion and Walter Buchanan, in Orangeburg, South Carolina. Walter was a professor and Dean of the School of Agriculture at South Carolina State College—then the only state school for African Americans in South Carolina. Marion, a school principal, became Buchanan's primary caregiver after Walter died when she was in the sixth grade.

Buchanan spent a considerable amount of time with her adopted father on his trips where he would work with tenant farmers in the Cotton Belt, advising them in their farming processes.

In 1962, Buchanan graduated from Bennett College, in Greensboro, North Carolina, a historically black women's college, with a Bachelor of Science degree in medical technology. She went on to attend Columbia University, where she received a master's degree in parasitology in 1968, and a master's degree in public health in 1969. After graduating, she worked as a medical technologist for the Veterans Administration Hospital in the Bronx, as well as a public health educator on vaccination, breastfeeding, and birth control for the East Orange Health Department. While working in New Jersey, Buchanan applied to medical school; although she was accepted to medical school as an alternate at Mount Sinai, Buchanan decided not to go due to her desire to dedicate more time to her art. Part of this choice consisted of her decision to "express the images, stories, and architecture of her African American childhood".

== Career ==
Buchanan began creating paintings and sculptures in the 1960s, showing her work at exhibitions and fairs in Staten Island and the Bronx. In 1971, she enrolled in a painting class taught by Norman Lewis at the Art Students League in New York City. Lewis and artist Romare Bearden, both members of the African-American artist collective Spiral, became friends and mentors to Buchanan. This relationship with Bearden happened after an accidental incident at a concert where Bearden designed a poster for the event. Buchanan bumped into Norman Lewis backstage while trying to get the Bearden poster signed, and Lewis took Buchanan back stage to meet Bearden. Buchanan later wrote a letter to Bearden reminding him of that event and Bearden became her mentor and led her to get involved with the Cinque Gallery. Buchanan decided to become a full-time artist in 1977 after Jock Truman, the former director of the Betty Parsons Gallery, exhibited her work at his gallery and encouraged her to leave her public health career. In the same year, she moved to Macon, Georgia to teach art at Stratford Academy, and began installing works of art among the natural landscape.

Buchanan's art takes the form of stone pedestals, bric-a brac assemblages, funny poems, self portraits and sculptural shacks. But potent themes of identity, place and collective memory unite the works uncovering the animus that runs through them: to connect with those around her and reckon with the history that shaped her communities. She cited Nellie Mae Rowe as an inspiration for her work, particularly her shacks.

Scholar Alex Campbell notes in an essay how Buchanan worked in a studio on College Street in Macon, Georgia, which served as an unofficial racial dividing line for the town. It "separated the working- and middle-class black part of town from the middle-class and affluent white part of town."

=== Drawings and paintings ===
Buchanan's early paintings of the 1970s primarily consist of abstract impressionist works on paper, including many still-lifes created while taking classes from by Norman Lewis. During this time, she also created her "Wall" paintings, which "[evoke] the visual erosion of architectural facades." Her later paintings of the 70s and 80s feature colorful flowers and structures inspired by Southern folk-culture.

During the 70s and 80s, Buchanan also created her most popular drawings: colorful "shacks" in oil pastel, mirroring her found-object "shack" sculptures. In 1976 and 1977, Buchanan drew "black walls" on paper. She "wanted to see what the wall looked like on the other side" and put four walls together in three dimensions.

=== Sculpture ===
Buchanan is best known for her many sculptures on the "shack", a rudimentary dwelling associated with the poor. Scholar Janet T. Marquardt argues that Buchanan treats shacks not as documentary elements but as "images of endurance and personal history;" often using bright colors and a style of childlike simplicity, the works "evoke the warmth and happiness that can be found even in the meanest dwelling, representing the faith and caring that is not reserved for privileged classes."

Buchanan created many sculptures from cement; an early example of this is the sculpture "Ruins and Rituals" at the Museum of Arts and Sciences in Macon, Georgia, part of a series of concrete structures that recall ancient tombs.

=== Land art ===
Buchanan is noted to have seen viewers sitting on her stone art piece Unity Stones, but let the men remain seated because she did not mind people sitting on her pieces as they contemplated the work and it represented. "The piece serves as a communal place to sit and talk, and do the other things that we do."

In 1980, Buchanan's piece, Wall Column, made of four cement sections, was featured in "Dialectics of Isolation: An Exhibition of Third World Women Artists of the United States," a major feminist exhibition organized by Ana Mendieta at A.I.R. Gallery.

==== Marsh Ruins ====
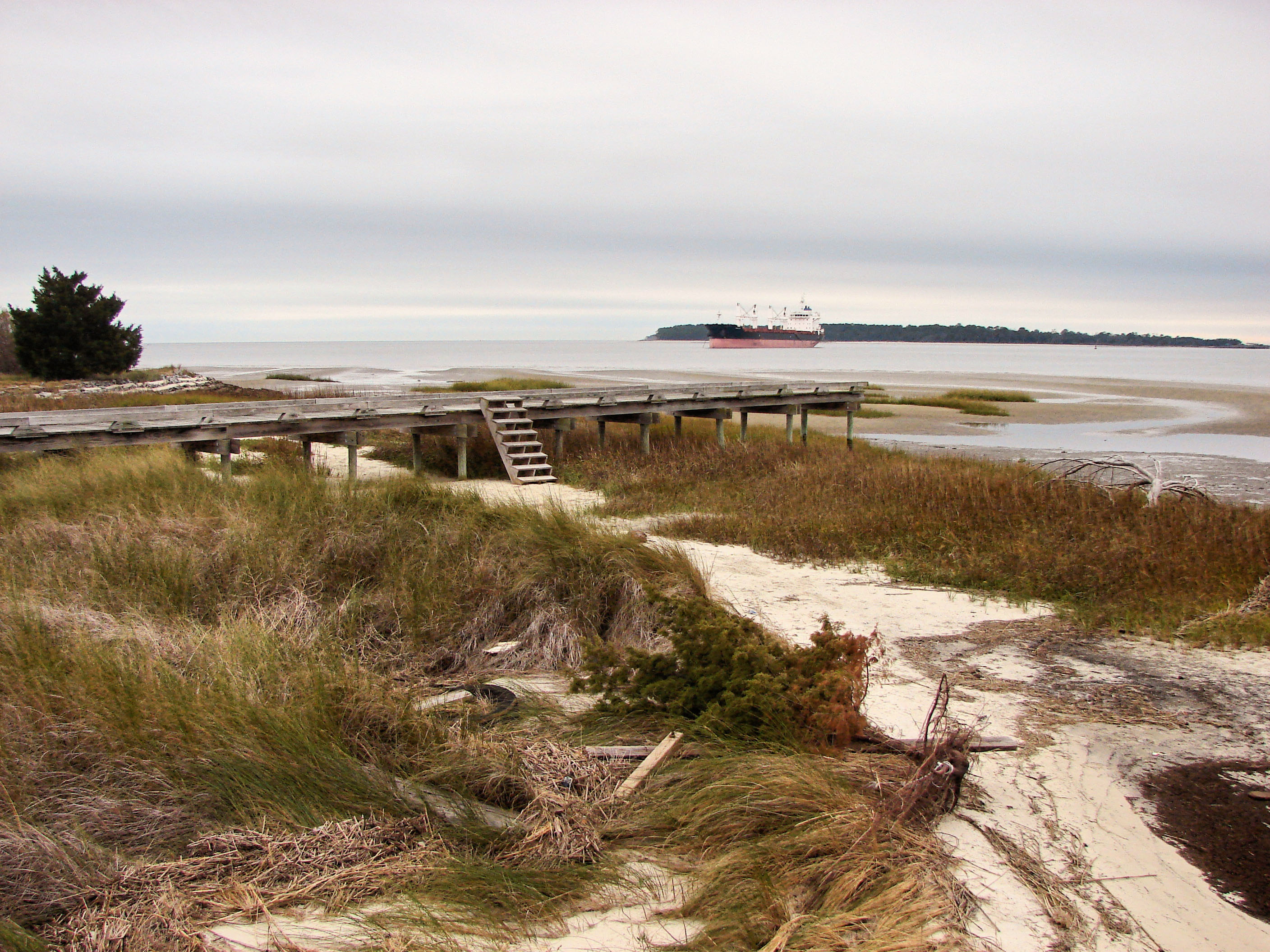
St. Simons Island, near Buchanan's Marsh Ruins.

In 1981, Buchanan created Marsh Ruins, a temporal land art sculpture on the coast of Georgia in Brunswick, near a commentated site known as "The Marshes of Glynn." To the east of the work was Saint Simons Island, where a group of Igbo people sold into slavery collectively drowned themselves in 1803. This work bears witness to the unmarked histories of enslaved peoples. There she planted three concrete forms and covered them with layers of tabby, a mixture used in slave living quarters. Buchanan completed the piece over the course of two days, funded by a Guggenheim Fellowship. Marsh Ruins gradually disintegrated into the marsh. Buchanan captured that erosion process on video. In 2021, Amelia Groom published a book devoted to the work.

Buchanan said of her work, "My work is a logical progression of my early interest in textures and surfaces and walls. The early "walls" were lonely, freestanding, fragmented things. When I lived in New York I was looking for things that were demolished. That gave them character. I liked to imagine who might have lived in the apartment, and whose home it might have been. Each family that moved in repainted the walls their color. When a building is torn down the various layers of color are exposed. It is almost surgical--like looking through a microscope and looking at different layers of tissue and media."

In an interview with Angela Son, Son asked Buchanan what her concept of home was and Buchanan responded with, "[Home] means what I've stablished and where I am, wherever that is. And it means South Carolina, where I grew up... I consider home as where I grew up."

Buchanan's last official outdoor sculpture was "Blue Station Stones," a public art project designed for the Earlington Heights Station of Miami-Dade Transit in 1986.

=== Death and representation ===
On July 4, 2015, Buchanan died in Ann Arbor, Michigan at the age of seventy-four. In the fall of 2016 a comprehensive exhibition of her work opened at the Brooklyn Museum in the Elizabeth A. Sackler Center for Feminist Art, organized by artist Park McArthur and curator Jennifer Burris. Beverly Buchanan - Ruins and Rituals featured painting, sculptures, drawings, as well as the artist's notebooks and photographs form her personal archive.

Buchanan has been represented by the Andrew Edlin Gallery since 2014, and her work was featured at their booth in the 2017 Independent Art Fair. Buchanan has remarked, "A lot of my pieces have the word 'ruins' in their titles because I think that tells you this object has been through a lot and survived — that's the idea behind the sculptures ... it's like, 'Here I am; I'm still here!'"

Buchanan's work featured among that of twenty African-American artists in an exhibition at the Turner Contemporary, Margate, Kent, UK in February 2020, entitled 'We Will Walk-Art and Resistance in the American South'. She was also featured in a 2021 exhibition at the Virginia Museum of Fine Arts, and a 2023 show at the Nasher Sculpture Center.

Buchanan's work is in the collection of the Addison Art Gallery of American Art at Phillips Academy in Andover, Massachusetts, Georgia Museum of Art, the Metropolitan Museum of Art, the Whitney Museum of American Art, and the High Museum of Art in Atlanta, Georgia.

== Awards ==
- 1980: Guggenheim Fellowship and a National Endowment for the Arts Fellowship
- 1990: National Endowment for the Arts Fellowship in sculpture
- 1994: Pollock-Krasner Foundation Award
- 1997: Georgia Visual Arts honoree
- 2002: Anonymous Was a Woman Award
- 2005: College Art Association Committee for Women in the Arts distinguished honoree
- 2011: Women's Caucus for Art lifetime achievement award

== Selected solo exhibitions ==
List from exhibition catalogue "9 Women in Georgia"

- Traveling retrospective exhibition organized by the Montclair Art Museum to nine museums and college galleries, 1994–96
- Steinbaum Krauss Gallery, New York, 1993
- Schering-Plough Headquarters Gallery, Madison, NJ, 1992
- Three Rivers Art Festival, Pittsburgh, Pennsylvania, 1992
- Chrysler Museum, Norfolk, VA, 1992
- Jacksonville Art Museum, Florida, 1992
- Bernie Steinbaum Gallery, New York, 1991, 1990
- Oregon School of Arts and Crafts, Portland, 1991
- Greenville County Museum, South Carolina, 1991
- Fairleigh Dickenson University, Rutherford, NJ, 1990
- Museum of Arts and Sciences, Macon, GA 1990
- Southeastern Center for Contemporary Art, Winston-Salem, NC, 1989
- Heath Gallery, Atlanta, GA 1987, 1986, 1981
- University of Alabama, 1982
- Kornblee Gallery, New York, 1981
- Truman Gallery, New York, 1978
- Mercer University, Macon, GA, 1977
- Upsala College, East Orange, NJ, 1974
- Cinque Gallery, New York, 1972
