= Judith Murray (artist) =

American artist

- Born: 1941 (age 84–85); New York City, United States
- Education: Pratt Institute, Real Academia de Bellas Artes de San Fernando
- Known for: Painting, drawing
- Spouse: Robert Yasuda
- Awards: John S. Guggenheim Fellowship, American Academy of Arts and Letters, National Endowment for the Arts
- Website: Judith Murray

Judith Murray (born 1941) is an American abstract painter based in New York City. Active since the 1970s, she has produced a wide-ranging, independent body of work while strictly adhering to idiosyncratic, self-imposed constants within her practice. Since 1975, she has limited herself to a primary palette of red, yellow, black and white paints—from which she mixes an infinite range of hues—and a near-square, horizontal format offset by a vertical bar painted along the right edge of the canvas; the bar serves as a visual foil for the rest of the work and acknowledges each painting’s boundary and status as an abstract object. Critic Lilly Wei describes Murray's work as "an extended soliloquy on how sensation, sensibility, and digressions can still be conveyed through paint" and how by embracing the factual world the "abstract artist can construct a supreme and sustaining fiction."

Judith Murray, Once in the Morning, oil on linen, 72" x 151", 2014.

Murray has been recognized with a Guggenheim Fellowship and awards from the American Academy of Arts and Letters and National Endowment for the Arts. She has exhibited internationally, including solo shows at MoMA PS1, the Clocktower Gallery and Dallas Museum of Fine Arts, and group exhibitions at the Whitney Museum of American Art, Museo di Palazzo Grimani (Venice Biennale), Museo de Arte Moderno (Mexico City), and National Academy Museum. Murray lives and works in New York City and Sugarloaf Key, Florida with her husband, artist Robert Yasuda.

== Early life and career ==
Murray was born in New York City, in 1941 but spent much of her childhood near the coast of southern Florida. She began to paint and study painting in childhood, during a period of prolonged illness. She continued her studies at Pratt Institute in Brooklyn in 1958, earning a BFA in 1962. After attending Real Academia de Bellas Artes de San Fernando in Madrid, Spain in 1963, she returned to Pratt and completed an MFA (1964). Following graduation, Murray worked with the United States Information Agency as an artist-in-residence in conjunction with the Grafica Americanska Exhibition held throughout Poland behind the Iron Curtain. Upon returning to the U.S., she accepted teaching positions at the University of Hawaii and the New York Institute of Technology; she would later teach and lecture at Long Island University, Pratt Institute, and Princeton University.

In the early 1970s, Murray was one of the pioneer artists that lived and worked in the lower Manhattan area that later became known as SoHo. She exhibited in solo shows at the historic Betty Parsons/Jock Truman Gallery (1976) and the Clocktower Gallery (1978) in New York and the Dallas Museum of Fine Arts (1982), among others. During that decade, she was also featured in the Whitney Biennial (1979) and group shows at PS1, Hallwalls and the Weatherspoon Art Museum, as well as the exhibition, "Art in Our Time," which traveled to the Milwaukee Art Museum, Contemporary Arts Center, and the High Museum of Art.

In her early career, Murray showed with the Pam Adler Gallery in New York (1979–86) and the Jan Turner Gallery in Los Angeles. Since then, she has had solo and two-person shows at MoMA PS1 (2001), Sundaram Tagore Gallery (New York, Beverly Hills and Singapore, 2002–18), and FiveMyles Gallery (2019), among others.

== Work and reception ==
Critics describe Murray as "an ardent, if non-doctrinaire, modernist" and colorist, whose "inclusive, open-ended formalism" has charted a distinct course regardless of art-world fashions within, for, or against abstraction. MoMA PS1 founder Alanna Heiss suggests that Murray has avoided predictability through a slow but constant evolution from her early hard-edged geometric abstraction to her later expressive style using gesture and impasto to evoke perceptual and tactile experiences. Her work suggests influences including the early modernists, New York School and Abstract Expressionists, El Greco and Albert Pinkham Ryder, as well as Eastern influences; her colors and compositions are also informed by places, art and culture she has encountered in travels to India and Asia, South America, and the tropics. She works primarily in oil on linen canvases, producing paintings noted most for their luminous color, sense of light, and varied, tactile surfaces and markmaking; critic Richard Kalina writes that her practice has "displayed clarity, discipline, and structure that function in marvelous counterpoint to the intuitive, the playful, and the evocative."

Judith Murray, Whitney Museum of American Art installation (1979), pictured works: (left) Red Angle, oil on canvas, 60.5" x 64.5", 1978; (right) Broadway, oil on canvas, 60.5" x 64.5", 1978.

=== Hard-edged abstraction (1974–1991) ===
Murray's early oil paintings were modestly sized, spare works in the hard-edged abstract tradition. They featured irregular geometric forms in reds, opaque whites and yellows floating on sensuous black fields and explored problems of balance and stability without relying on symmetry (e.g., her "Ballast" series, 1976). These ambiguous "figures"—compared to sails, wings, kites, moons, exotic sea creatures or decadent, even dangerous, spiky plants—derived less from the natural world than from the imagination or subconscious. Reviewing Murray's first major solo exhibition (Parsons-Truman, 1976), SoHo Weekly News critic John Perreault described her as a "non-conformist painter" whose images suggest an open-ended but withheld logic, like signs or diagrams; the Village Voice counted her "eccentric abstractions" among the highlights of the 1979 Whitney Biennial (e.g., Red Angle and Broadway, both 1978).

Judith Murray, Inheritance, oil on linen, 72" x 76", 1988–9.

The work Murray exhibited at the Dallas Museum of Fine Arts employed tapering arcs, dynamic lines, and splinter- and scimitar-like forms in more complex, energized compositions that recall Russian constructivism (e.g., Red Wing, 1980; Smoke, 1979–82). The Dallas Times Herald noted the "sheer visual dazzle" of their varied matte, gloss and slightly textured surfaces and "rhythms answered by counter-rhythms" that were anchored by thin, right-edge tan bars. In the mid-1980s, Murray began experimenting with raised areas of thick pigment, layered underpainting and dappled, gently modeled figures and grounds in paintings that the New York Times noted for contrasts of mysterious light and blackness and dynamic versus subdued, gradually clarified forms (e.g., Mercury or Bishop, 1983–4). Los Angeles Times critic Kristine McKenna described them as "anthropomorphic abstractions" built around "Jungian shapes freighted with inexplicable meaning" that coursed with energy and suggestions of the struggle toward consciousness.

=== Expressive abstraction (1992–2006) ===
Murray began to focus on the space around her forms in the 1990s, gradually eliminating hard-edges. These more dispersed compositions emphasize texture, atmosphere and a sense of pulsating light through vigorous, feathered gestures that create mosaic-like surfaces (e.g., Madurai, 1994 or Mars, 1997). By the end of the decade, Murray was producing paintings up to 8' x 9' that increasingly evoked the natural world, such as experiences of the Florida Keys—not literally, but as abstractly conveyed sensations (light, energy, sky, water, land, plants). Critic Barry Schwabsky wrote that this new work revealed "romantic affinities" and a sense of urgency and drama; he characterized Murray as "a temperate lyricist" combining sensibility (spirited brushwork, flickering light and tactility) and restraint (coherent architectures in each work). Many of her titles—some suggested by the poetry of Wallace Stevens—evoked the poetics of place or nocturnal moods: Night Fishing (1998), Camouflage for the Moon (1997), Shadows in Our Sun (1999–2000). Lilly Wei describes these works as vibrant, staccato "landscapes without landscapes, plumbing the referential, not the representational."

In the 2000s, critics continued to highlight Murray's lyrical expression, ethereal brushwork, sense of light, and increasingly, her sculptural use of paint, which lent her work depth, motion and a tangible physicality. Alanna Heiss and Edward Leffingwell suggest that while Murray's subject is "paint itself," she simultaneously evokes real sensations such as evening light on water (the grays and calligraphic white marks of Primary Document, 2006) or the reds and pinks of a fiery sunset (Royal Flush, 2006). The atmospheric work Magnetic South (2006), a sunny, fluctuating field of thick yellow and pink strokes, is often cited as a bravura display of the Murray's ability to achieve equilibrium and coherent structure through dense, abstract gestures and color organization. The painting's creation—much of it on a ladder—was tracked over a three-month period in the episodic Albert Maysles/Mark Ledzian documentary, Judith Murray: Phases and Layers.

=== Later painting (2007– ) ===
Judith Murray, American Academy of Arts and Letters installation (2005), pictured works: (left) First Light, oil on canvas, 96" x 108", 2004; (right) La Forza de Destino, oil on canvas, 96" x 108", 2004.

Critic Barbara MacAdam writes that Murray's later work assumes "a daring position … steadfastly sticking to abstract gestural work." These paintings feature deep, seductive colors and complex, modulated roses, grays, creams, oranges, golds and silvers, as well as a sense of discontinuous space that together bridge Eastern influences—(Rajput painting, Persian carpets and textiles, Chinese painting)—and Western impressionistic or pointillistic techniques.

Lilly Wei described Murray's "Continuum" show (2009) as continuing her shift to a more painterly mode with "explosive, complex, imbricated rhythms" that conjure "landscapes in flux, worlds in transition and the roiling energy of the cosmos." Murray's "Without Borders" show (2012) signaled "a stunning departure" and "breakthrough" to critics Lawrence Osgood and David Cohen, respectively, synthesizing her early hard-edged work and current expressive style. She continued to employ accumulated, Cézanne-like short brushstrokes, lively patterns and the right-edge bar, while introducing small, scattered geometric shapes recalling, in miniature, her 1970s figures; eccentric, crystalline and almost heraldic, these forms seemingly "invade" the now-signature all-over patterns of works such as First Day and A Night in Tunisia (both 2011).

Murray's aptly named exhibition, "Tempest" (2018), featured mosaic-like, whirlwind compositions, overflowing with richly colored, energetic brushstrokes that reviews compare to swarms of bees or schools of fish crossing the picture plane. Its centerpiece was the large diptych, Once in the Morning (2014), which featured a sense of deep space and a blanket of gold marks that critics likened to the opulence of a Klimt interior. The show also introduced a new, late-career development: small, uncharacteristically quick-looking 11" x 14" canvasses employing a wider bar (to maintain the illusion of the square format), intersecting perspectives and interruptive gestures (e.g., Poof, Junction and Gaggle, 2017–8); they suggest buoyancy, movement and natural forces run amok.

== Public collections and recognition ==
Murray's work belongs to the permanent collections of the Metropolitan Museum of Art, Whitney Museum, The Library of Congress, New York Public Library, British Museum, Brooklyn Museum, Carnegie Institute, Honolulu Museum of Art, MIT List Visual Arts Center, Museum of Fine Arts, Houston, National Museum of Art (Poland), Philadelphia Museum of Art, Smithsonian American Art Museum, U.S. Department of State, Walker Art Center, and Yale University Art Gallery, among other public and private collections.

She has been recognized with fellowships from the John Simon Guggenheim Memorial Foundation (2002) and National Endowment for the Arts (1983) and an American Academy of Arts and Letters Award (2005). She was inducted into the National Academy of Design in 2009, and has been a member of the American Abstract Artists since 1985. She has also been commissioned Lincoln Center to create artwork for posters and prints for several Mozart Festival events.
