= No. 3/No. 13 (Magenta, Black, Green on Orange) =

1949 painting by Mark Rothko

- Artist: Mark Rothko
- Year: 1949
- Medium: Acrylic on canvas
- Dimensions: 216.5 cm × 164.8 cm (85.2 in × 64.9 in)
- Location: Museum of Modern Art; New York

No. 3/No. 13 (Magenta, Black, Green on Orange) is a 1949 oil on canvas painting of American artist Mark Rothko created in 1949. The painting is composed of symmetrical rectangular blocks of magenta, black and green colors on orange background. No.3/No.13 (Magenta, Black, Green on Orange) was also influenced by the loss of Rothko's mother, who died in October 1948. It is held at the Museum of Modern Art, in New York.

== Background ==
Rothko belonged to the New York School, was also known as Abstract Expressionist, shaped by the Great Depression and World War II. No.3/No.13 (Magenta, Black, Green on Orange) is one of the early Mark Rothko's works produced within the color field movement. It is an early example of a compositional structure that Rothko explored for more than twenty years. Most of Rothko's color field paintings were created during periods of extreme happiness or sadness that fueled his innovative work and impacted the color schemes, becoming darker and darker over several decades.

== Exhibitions ==
Rothko exhibited No.3/No.13 (Magenta, Black, Green on Orange) and his other color field paintings at Betty Parsons Gallery, New York.
