= Museum of Arts and Sciences =

The Museum of Arts and Sciences is the name for several museums:

- Museum of Arts and Sciences (Macon, Georgia) in Macon, Georgia
- Museum of Arts and Sciences (Daytona Beach) in Daytona Beach, Florida

== See also ==
- Bruce Museum of Arts and Science in Greenwich, Connecticut
- Museum of Applied Arts & Sciences in Sydney, Australia
