= Judith Murray =

Judith Murray may refer to:

- Judith Sargent Murray (1751–1820), American advocate for women's rights and writer
- Judith Murray (artist) (born 1941), American abstract painter
