= Lee Hall (artist) =

American university president, writer, and painter (1934–2017)

13th President of the Rhode Island School of Design
- In office 1975 – June 30, 1983
- Preceded by: Talbot Rantoul
- Succeeded by: Thomas F. Schutte

Personal details
- Born: December 15, 1934 Lexington, North Carolina, U.S.
- Died: April 17, 2017 (aged 82) Northampton, Massachusetts, U.S.
- Education: Warburg Institute
- Alma mater: University of North Carolina at Greensboro, New York University
- Occupation: Painter, writer, educator, university president

Lee Hall (December 15, 1934 – April 17, 2017) was an American painter, writer, educator, and a university president. She was an abstract landscape painter. She served as the 13th president of Rhode Island School of Design (RISD). In 1993, Hall wrote a controversial book on the artists Willem de Kooning and Elaine de Kooning.

== Early life and education ==
Lee Hall was born on December 15, 1934, in Lexington, North Carolina. Her parents divorced when she was young and her early childhood was spent in Florida.

She attended the Woman’s College of the University of North Carolina, in Greensboro (now the University of North Carolina at Greensboro) and received a BFA degree in 1955. She had studied under painter John Opper. She continued her studies at New York University and received a MA degree in art education in 1959, followed by a PhD in creative arts in 1965. She did postdoctoral work at Warburg Institute.

== Art career ==
Hall was an abstract landscape painter. Early in her career she formed relationships with painters Elaine and Willem de Kooning, and art dealer Betty Parsons. She had exhibited her paintings alongside Jackson Pollock, Mark Rothko, and Robert Motherwell. For many years she had maintained her painting studio on a farm in Lyme, Connecticut.

Lee’s art is held in many museum collections including the Indianapolis Museum of Art, the Montclair Art Museum, the Seattle Art Museum, the Newark Museum of Art, the Hudson River Museum, the Weatherspoon Art Museum, the Rhode Island School of Design Museum, the Bechtler Museum of Modern Art, and the Mint Museum.

== Teaching and arts administration ==
Hall taught at State University of New York at Potsdam (SUNY Potsdam) from 1958 until 1960; she was an Associate Professor and Head of the Department of Art at Keuka College from 1960 until 1962; she taught at Winthrop College (now Winthrop University) from 1962 until 1965; and served as Chair of the Department of Art at Drew University from 1965 until 1974.

From 1975 until 1983, Hall served as the 13th President of the Rhode Island School of Design in Providence. During her tenure at RISD Hall was part of the effort to introduce the first computer system for the administration, she was in leadership during the unionization of the faculty, she worked to revise the faculty manual, and to restructure the financial administration. On June 30, 1983, Hall stepped down from her role as president of RISD and she was succeeded by Thomas F. Schutte.

== Later career ==
After RISD, Hall became a partner in the Betty Parsons Gallery in New York City as well as joined the Academy for Educational Development (AED) the following year.

In 1993, Hall released the book Elaine and Bill, Portrait of a Marriage: The Lives of Willem and Elaine de Kooning (1993, HarperCollins) which was highly debated amongst artists and caused controversy due to the portrayal of Elaine de Kooning as "a sexual predator".

Hall died of stomach cancer on April 17, 2017, in Northampton, Massachusetts.

== Publications ==
- Hall, Lee (1991). Betty Parsons: Artist, Dealer, Collector. New York City, NY: Harry N. Abrams, Inc. ISBN 9780810937123.
- Hall, Lee (1993). Elaine and Bill, Portrait of a Marriage: The Lives of Willem and Elaine de Kooning. New York City, NY: HarperCollins Publishing. ISBN 9780060183059.
- Hall, Lee (1997). Patrick, William (ed.). Athena: A Biography. Da Capo Press. ISBN 9780201870466.

== See also ==
- List of presidents of the Rhode Island School of Design
