= Robert Yasuda =

American visual artist

- Born: 1940 (age 85–86); Lihue, Kauai, Territory of Hawaii, United States
- Education: Pratt Institute
- Known for: Painting, installation art, works on paper
- Spouse: Judith Murray
- Awards: American Academy of Arts and Letters, National Endowment for the Arts
- Website: Robert Yasuda

Robert Yasuda (born 1940) is an American abstract painter, most known for contemplative, atmospheric works that straddle painting, sculpture and architecture. He first attracted wide attention in the 1970s for large wall works merging painting and installation art, mounted at MoMA PS1, the Corcoran Museum of Art, and Museum of Contemporary Art, Chicago. Since the 1990s, he has focused on paintings that disrupt conventional formats using hand-carved wood panels and custom framing elements, upon which he builds multi-layered iridescent surfaces that respond dynamically to shifting conditions of light, time and vantage. Reviewing this later work, ARTnews critic Barbara MacAdam described Yasuda as a "romantic minimalist" whose paintings present an intangible, fleeting reality that is nonetheless referential, showing his roots in their construction, shifting tones and titles.

Robert Yasuda, Harmony, acrylic polymer on fabric on wood, 80" x 62", 2005.

Yasuda has exhibited internationally, including shows at the Museo di Palazzo Grimini (Venice Biennale), Galerie Bischofberger, Betty Parsons Gallery, The Clocktower, and Albright-Knox Art Gallery, among others. His art belongs to the public collections of the Brooklyn Museum, Library of Congress and New York Public Library, among others, and he has received awards from the American Academy of Arts and Letters, National Endowment for the Arts, and John Hay Whitney Foundation. He lives and works in New York City and Sugarloaf Key, Florida with his wife, artist Judith Murray.

== Life and career ==
Robert Masao Yasuda was born in Lihue, Kauai, Hawaii in 1940. He spent his childhood in rural Hawaii before attending boarding high school in Honolulu, where exposure to museums and concerts influenced his decision to be an artist. In 1958, he moved to New York City to study art at the Pratt Institute, earning BFA and MFA degrees and immersing himself in the work of the New York School artists. In the early 1960s, he rented a vacant cafeteria on Long Island for use as a studio and began painting multi-image abstract oil paintings on canvas. These early paintings were exhibited in solo shows at Galerie Bischofberger (Zurich and St. Moritz) in 1968 and 1969.

In the early 1970s, Yasuda converted a space in SoHo into a live-work studio and began exploring themes of perception and light in minimal paintings that increasingly took on a sculptural and architectural presence. This work evolved into large-scale wall-painting installations, the first of which he mounted at Betty Parsons Gallery in 1975; Over the next decade, he created site-specific installations determined by the venue architecture at The Clocktower Gallery, MoMA PS1, Corcoran Museum of Art, Museum of Contemporary Art, Chicago, and the Brooklyn Bridge Anchorage.

Later in his career, he turned to hand-crafted multi-panel paintings in solo exhibitions at Koplin Gallery in Los Angeles (1982–8), Elizabeth Harris Gallery (New York, 1993–06), Sundaram Tagore Gallery (New York and Singapore, 2010, 2014), and David Lusk Gallery (Memphis, 2000–19), among others. He has also appeared in group shows at the McNay Art Museum, Newhouse Center for Contemporary Art, and The Contemporary Museum, Honolulu.

== Work and reception ==
Yasuda's paintings have been described as meditative investigations of ephemerality, perception and form that slowly reveal themselves through subtle marks, alterations and color shifts in relation to changing light and viewing conditions. Throughout his career, he has defied conventional painting boundaries, introducing new spatial contexts and idiosyncratic sculptural, architectural and framing elements, frequently in multi-panel works; these elements include bowed and carved wooden panels and forms, rounded or upturned corners, and incomplete frames suggesting lintel, gate or bridge forms, among others. He employs a collage-like process that generally begins with acrylic-painted wooden structures, which he then wraps with sheer fabrics, layers again with translucent, fresco-like veils of pigment, and lastly, varnishes to create light-active surfaces. Over time, he has moved beyond formal minimalism toward more subjective and sensual work that seeks to visually convey moments of perception and insight, along with allusions to nature and his heritage, including impressions of Hawaii and Florida and his childhood teachings in Buddhism.

Robert Yasuda, Pompeii, acrylic polymer on fabric on wood, 80" x 156", 1992.

=== Early work and wall painting installations (1970–85) ===
Yasuda's early work consisted of multi-panel, often unconventionally shaped paintings and large-scale wall painting installations. His wall paintings angled off existing walls or structures in forward tilts to create new, compressed and angular spaces, distinguishing themselves as objects rather than murals. He used diagonals, simple painted motifs, subtle lines and shifts in hue to both enhance and offset these physical and spatial sensations, exploring contradictions of perspective and perception. Critic John Perreault wrote that the installations demonstrated "abstract art's potential for spiritual power," while New York Magazine's Thomas Hess described the work as "an art of delicacies" developed at an architectural scale.

Yasuda's installation for PS1's inaugural exhibition "Rooms" (1976) occupied two connecting rooms. In one room, he displayed a large, tilted painting inscribed with a triangle and a subtle, mirrored double above it, which was arranged to be visible through the door to the adjoining room; in the other, two tilted paintings almost as large as the original walls featured diagonals that reflected the other room's painting. His installation at The Clocktower, Double Oblique (1977), employed four back-to-back panels in a W-formation, each divided by a diagonal running between opposite corners, which led the eye inward, outward, up or down depending on vantage point and compressed or expanded the space. In 1979, the Museum of Contemporary Art, Chicago invited Yasuda (and four others, including Robert Ryman and Lucio Pozzi) to create large, individual temporary visual environments directly on the museum's principal exhibition walls.

Yasuda's solo exhibitions of this time often combined installation and individual works. Arts Magazine described his 1977 Parsons Gallery exhibition as a "tour de force statement" of understated purity on the possibilities of transforming space, light and color. Using natural, artificial and reflected light and subtle color effects, the show featured slim vertical works spanning gallery corners, rectangular paired canvases suspended diagonally out from walls, and straightforward horizontal paintings with divided diagonal or horizontal areas of closely related, barely inflected peach, pink and white. In shows throughout the U.S. in the 1980s—at Albright College and the Thomas Babeor, Betty Parsons, Marianne Deson, Hoshour, and Koplin galleries—Yasuda evolved this work to include shield-like, irregularly shaped multi-panel works, and later, irregular framing devices.

Robert Yasuda, Footprint, acrylic polymer on fabric on wood, 49" x 32", 1998.

=== Later work ===
In two exhibitions at Elizabeth Harris Gallery (1993, 1996), Yasuda presented large abstractions combining rectangular wood panels placed side-by-side or stacked, which New York Times critic Pepe Karmel compared to pairs and quartets of monochrome canvases by Brice Marden. Critics noted in these paintings a quiet optical effect of inner light, achieved through Yasuda's alternating layers of translucent color and scrim-like, stretched fabric, the tight weave adding a grid-like formality over autumnal and spring-like shades of gray, green, tan, blue and grey. In title, these works often allude to actual locales (e.g., Pompeii, Prairie), but were actually painted partly plein air in the Florida Keys summer and finished in Yasuda's New York studio. Cover Magazine wrote that despite the work's non-objective minimalism, it convincingly suggested sea air and dappled light, creating "an exotic amalgam of natural and artificial settings, of daylight and Halogen-influenced time."

In the 2000s, Yasuda exhibited work at Elizabeth Harris (2002–6) and Sundaram Tagore (2010, 2014) that critics increasingly defined by its luminosity, lyricism, eccentrically shaped supports, and subtle emphasis on states of mind (Bliss, 2001; Harmony, 2005) and ephemeral aspects of water, light, air, form and color (e.g., Footprint, 1998; Vapor, 2001; Wind, 2002). During this period, he increasingly hand-crafted his shaped panels with refined idiosyncrasies that played with expectations and thwarted their geometric aspects to otherworldly effect: bowed supports, protruding edges, gentle curves, clefts and contoured or feathered corners that suggested impermanence and motion. In a Brooklyn Rail review, Michael Brennan writes that this hands-on craftsmanship "is essential to [the] works' poetic aura," and echoing others, relates the panels to the aerodynamic shaping of surfboards, part of Yasuda's experience in his native Hawaii.

Critics suggest that the disturbances in Yasuda's panel shapes offset his harmonious color treatment, at that time, mottled shades of blue, grey, green, warm pink or gold that Barbara MacAdam wrote "resemble pockets carved out of atmosphere or the surface of the ocean." In the middle of the decade, he increasingly turned to interference paints yielding more intense, silvery tones that shift according to vantage point and light source and were compared to the pearlescence of interior abalone shells or the iridescence of butterflies and exotic fish. He sometimes extended the sense of flickering color or back-illumination by painting the backs of his wall supports to create subtle reflected color and shadowing on walls surrounding the work.

Robert Yasuda, Across the River, acrylic polymer on wallboard, 120" x 336", 2016. Installation at MoMA PS1.

In later exhibitions, Yasuda has expanded his range, re-introducing and reworking early motifs and developing new elements. His 2006 and 2010 shows offered narrow corner paintings (e.g., Beacon 2005; Guardian, 2009) that function like vertical studs or posts and appear as part of the gallery structure; Michael Brennan compared their rigor, atmospherics, and reflected iridescence to the light sculptures of Dan Flavin. The latter show also featured imposing, near-monochrome panels stacked or abutted to one another, as in Ancestor (2009), a seven-foot, mint green work consisting of two pillar-like shapes; ARTnews critic Doug McClemont described such works as confident but unassuming "pearly gateways" that together created a mysterious "cathedral atmosphere." Yasuda also began augmenting his panels with strips of hand-carved black wood balanced above panels that act as architectural or framing elements (e.g., Thesis, 2009; Vintage, 2012; and Aurora, 2013) ARTnews's Lilly Wei considered his 2014 show a breakthrough, whose "lush" works offered a more nuanced and fluid visual experience through an expanded palette, richer surface tonalities, and increasingly undulating contours; these included Botanikos (2013), which mixed rosy hues into translucent, oceanic green panels clefted with turquoise.

With installations at the MoMA PS1 40th anniversary exhibition, "Forty" (2016, curated by Alanna Heiss), and the Museo di Palazzo Grimini (2015, collateral to the Venice Biennale), Yasuda revisited the wall paintings of his early career. The creation of the site-specific MoMA PS1 work, Across the River—a two-part, largely green backlit work that engages its room's lighting, paint surfaces and architecture— was documented in the film, Making Sense of It (2017), by Mark Ledzian.

== Public collections and awards ==
Yasuda's work belongs to the public collections of the Brooklyn Museum, Library of Congress, New York Public Library, Bass Museum, Carnegie Museum of Art, McNay Art Museum, State Foundation for the Arts (Honolulu), Virginia Museum of Fine Arts, Wadsworth Atheneum, and several higher learning institutions. He has been recognized with two American Academy of Arts and Letters Purchase Awards (2016 and 2008) and grants from the National Endowment for the Arts (1981) and John Hay Whitney Foundation (1962).
