= Mahmoud Jalal =

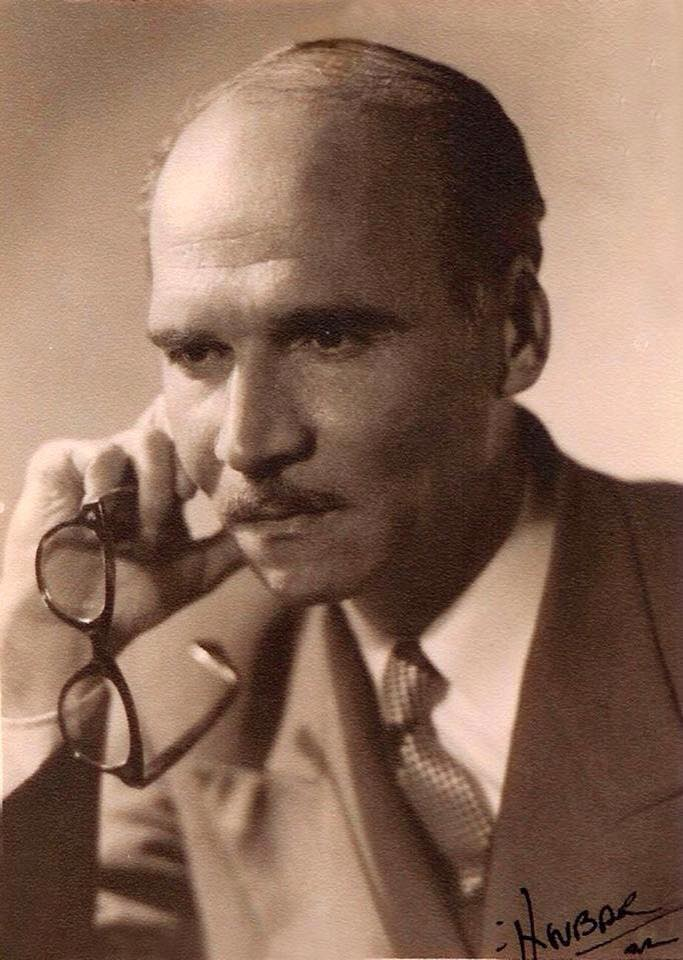
- Born: 1911; Tripoli, Libya
- Died: 1975 (aged 63–64); Damascus, Syria
- Movement: Syrian Modern Art

Mahmoud Jalal (Arabic: محمود جلال), (1911 - 1975), was a Syrian artist, painter, sculptor, and medalist born in Libya. He is one of the early leaders of the modern art movement in Syria.

== Biography ==
Mahmoud Jalal was born in 1911, Tripoli, Libya. He died in 1975, Damascus, Syria, where he participated at the beginning of the construction of the academic and artistic foundations and the development of local art institutes. His artworks have been exhibited nationally and internationally, during his lifetime and to this day, with his artwork being well represented in the National Museum of Damascus. For one of the exhibitions at the museum honoring Mahmoud Jalal in 1993, the late critic and the then director of the Directorate of Fine Arts of Damascus, Tariq al-Sharif, spoke of Jalal's contribution as an artist, as well as an “educator of generations of artists, and a distinct personality within our artistic movement.” In another article, Tariq al-Sharif described Jalal as a “leading artist of the art movement in Syria”, and shared of Jalal's struggle to elevate the artistic movement and how he “remained faithful to his principles until the end.”

=== Education ===
As a young man, in 1935, Mahmoud Jalal was accepted to study painting at the Accademia di Belle Arti di Roma, while at the same time, he took sculpture courses at the San Jacomo Institute in Rome, Italy. After his graduation from the academy in 1939, Jalal returned to Syria and began teaching and introducing new art concepts. Later, in 1960, he became an overseer of the art programs for Damascus schools.

=== Contributions ===
Mahmoud Jalal was one of the original founders of the Syrian Society in 1950, then the Association of Syrian Artists for Painting and Sculpture, where he became president. Jalal was one of the few who made a great effort to establish the College of Fine Arts in 1960, where he served as a professor of sculpture and painting, and later became dean until 1970. After the establishment of the College of Fine Arts, he became the Rapporteur of the Committee of Fine Arts at the Supreme Council for the Care of Arts and Arts from its establishment until 1969. Jalal was commissioned by the state to complete several large sculptures and memorials, including a monument in the city of Amouda.

=== Awards and recognition ===
- Mahmoud Jalal won the first prize in drawing in 1951 at the National Museum in Damascus.
- Won the first prize in sculpture in 1951 at the Damascus National Gallery.
- Granted a patent of appreciation from the Ministry of Culture in 1960.
- Presented the founding statement of the Fine Arts Association in the first founding session of the Syndicate in 1969.
- Awarded the first class of the Syrian Order of Merit in 1971.

=== Collections ===
- National Museum of Damascus, Syria.
- Ministry of Foreign Affairs, Damascus, Syria.
- Ministry of Culture, Damascus, Syria.
- Ministry of Education, Damascus, Syria.
- Mahmoud Jalal's artwork has also been acquired by private collectors inside and outside the country.
