= Jock Truman =

- Born: 4 September 1920; Minneapolis, Minnesota
- Died: 2011
- Known for: Art History, Art Collectors

Jock Truman (1920-2011) was an art dealer and collector in the twentieth-century arts scene in New York City. He was known as an art collector and dealer who worked at the Betty Parsons Gallery in New York, NY. From 1976 to 1979, he also owned the commercial art gallery bearing his name, the Truman Gallery. Processing of his personal papers at the Archives of American Art suggests that his longtime "companion" was Eric Green.
