= Lawrence Osgood =

Lawrence Osgood, on the Barrenlands

Lawrence Osgood (died December 13, 2018) was a novelist, playwright and essayist with joint US/Canadian citizenship. He held a bachelor's degree cum laude in English Literature from Harvard and a master's degree in Creative Writing from the University of Michigan.

He has had short stories, essays, and a major novel published in the US and Canada, been a member of the playwrights' committee at the Actors Studio in New York, has had plays published and produced in New York and regionally in the US, directed at theaters on both coasts, and has taught acting and playwriting at the University of Connecticut. He lived, traveled, and worked in the Canadian Arctic for ten years, directing an Inuktitut revitalization language project for an Inuit organization, developing and producing Inuit children's television programming, and kayaking several Arctic rivers, some of them in first descents.

Works

Short stories and essays in The London Magazine, Canadian Fiction Magazine, Quest/77, Potpouri, The Carleton Miscellany, How I Write (a textbook), and the St. Martin's Press Year's Best Fantasy and Horror.

Midnight Sun (novel)
The Rook (play)
Pigeons (play)
Soap (play)
Ox on the Roof (play)
Old Buffalo (play)

The author's website can be found at http://lawrenceosgood.wordpress.com/
