= Museum of Arts and Sciences (Macon, Georgia) =

Museum in Macon, Georgia, USA

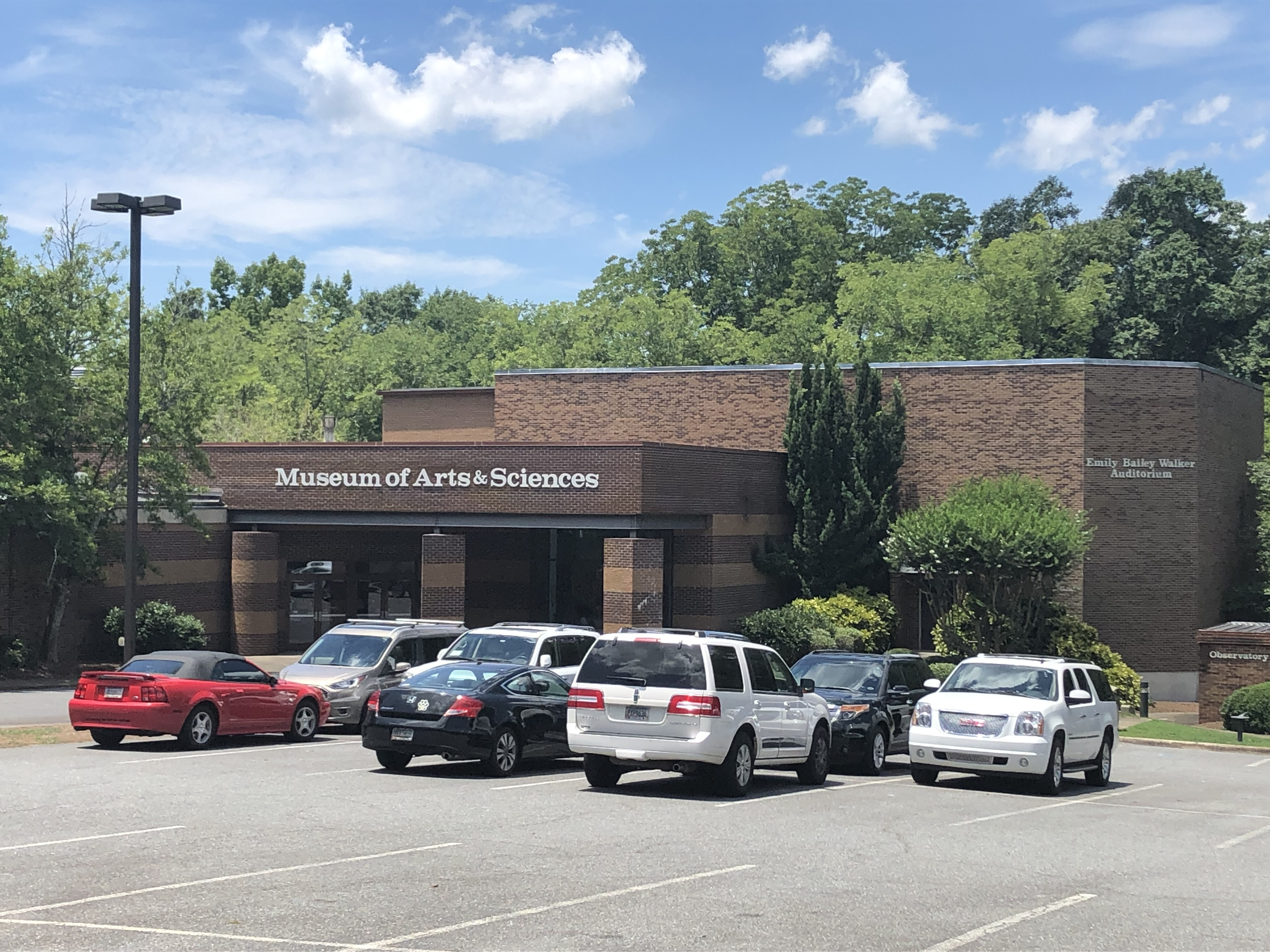
- Main Entrance in June 2019
- Established: 1956
- Location: 4182 Forsyth Road, Macon, Georgia
- Coordinates: 32°51′53.3″N 83°41′42.6″W
- Type: Art, Science
- Accreditation: American Alliance of Museums
- Director: Jim Greenhouse
- Website: www.masmacon.org

The Museum of Arts and Sciences in Macon is a community museum in the U.S. state of Georgia. The facility includes four galleries with frequently changing exhibitions, the Discovery House with hands-on activities, live animal habitats, the Mark Smith Planetarium, nature trail, garden, store, auditorium, and classrooms. New exhibitions on fine arts, science topics, and the humanities are presented for periods of four to six months. The museum is open to the public daily and offers programs to schools and groups. The museum is a member of the American Alliance of Museums as of July 2019.

== History ==
The museum first opened in 1956 and started as a room in the Wesleyan Conservatory with a few activities for children. In 1964, the museum moved locations with the construction of a gallery and workshop. A year later, a planetarium would be added as a new wing of the museum. A 1980 addition included most of the museum's infrastructure. The Discovery House, a new lobby, and classrooms were added in 2001. In 2018, an additional building was added which provides a view of the peach orchard behind the building. Planned additions to the museum, including a bat cave and amphitheater, were approved in March 2019 and are expected to be complete by the end of the year.

== Exhibitions ==
=== Art Gallery ===
The Museum of Arts and Science's art gallery is a mixture of permanent gallery pieces and temporary exhibit pieces. The gallery is typically divided into three sections, with one section being for the permanent fixtures and the other two for the exhibits. Exhibitions shown include Fired by Genius: The Ceramics of Pablo Picasso, Sunlight and Shadow: American Impressionism, and The Art of Tiffany.

=== Mark Smith Planetarium ===
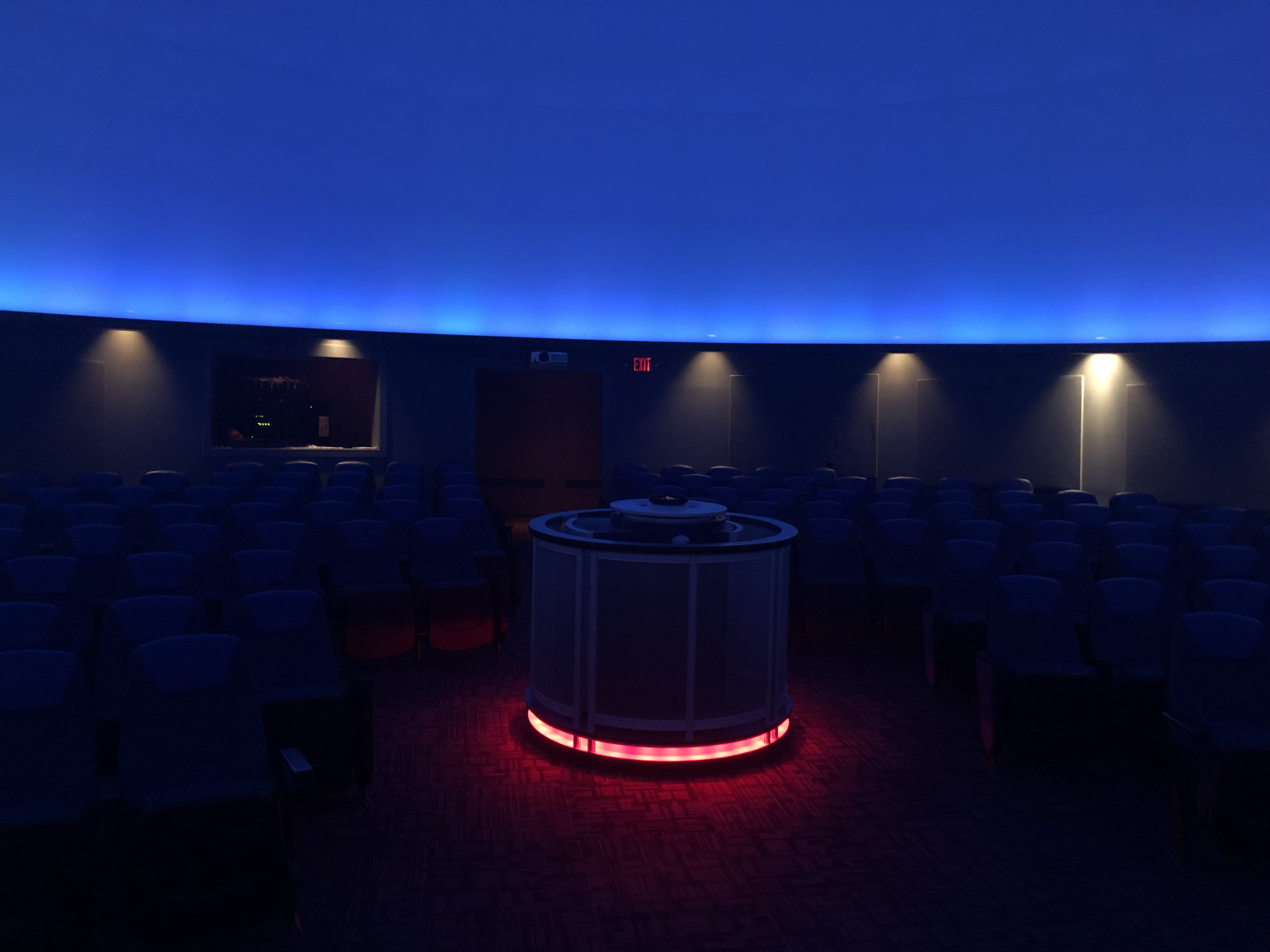
Inside of the Mark Smith Planetarium

The Mark Smith Planetarium is an observatory built in 1965 and located to the southwest of the main entrance. The planetarium runs shows over various topics in astronomy, with two daily shows. The shows switch astronomical topics every two months. In addition to the shows, the planetarium is able to produce a virtual skyline with over 4,000 stars available for viewing. The size of the dome is 12.2 meters, and the planetarium can seat up to 118 people.

=== Mini-Zoo ===
The Mini-Zoo is a wing of the facility that houses animals, located to the left of the Discovery House. It has housed numerous kinds of animals, including monkeys, birds, snakes, and an alligator. The exhibit is designed to simulate a jungle environment, and has two stories for visitors to view the animals from. The animals are also part of auditorium shows, led by the museum's animal caregivers.

=== Discovery House ===
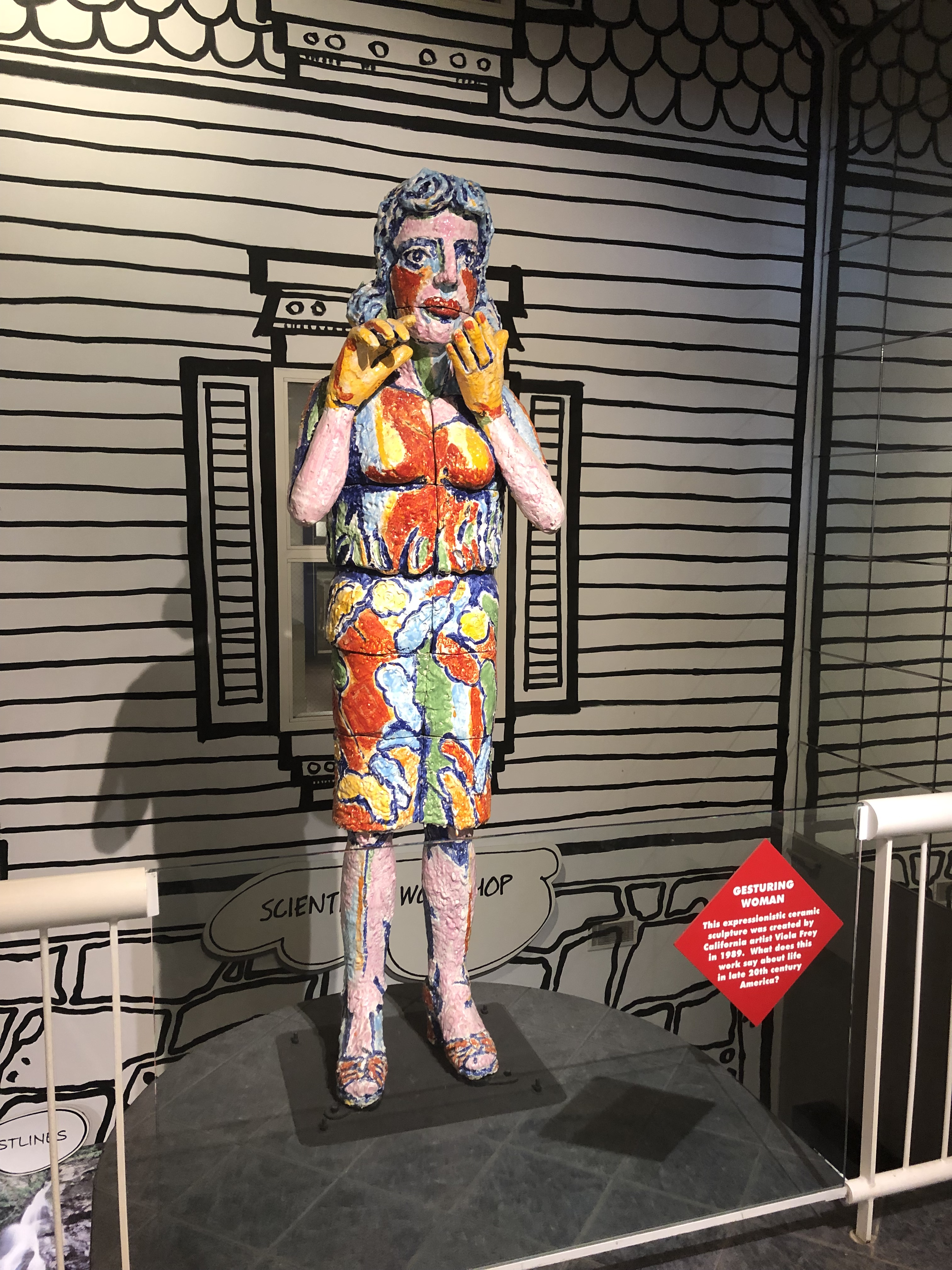
Gesturing Woman by Viola Frey.

The Discovery House is a three-story wing, making it the largest exhibit in the museum. It is preceded by Gesturing Woman, a piece by Viola Frey. Each floor is focused on a different area of study; The upper floor is focused on visual art, including activities that allow for children to create their own art such as paper dolls and a light box; The base level floor focuses on the humanities, providing activities intended to promote well-rounded education on the world such as poetry writing and a map room; The bottom floor focuses on science, with activities such as fossil digging and simple experiments in weather and magnetism. This section of the museum includes "Ziggy", a 40 million year old whale fossil, as well as a taxidermy adult polar bear.

=== Outdoor Spaces ===
The Museum of Arts and Sciences' grounds include an amphitheater, a pavilion, raptor retreat, bat cave, and walking trails.
