= Betty Parsons =

American artist, art dealer, and collector

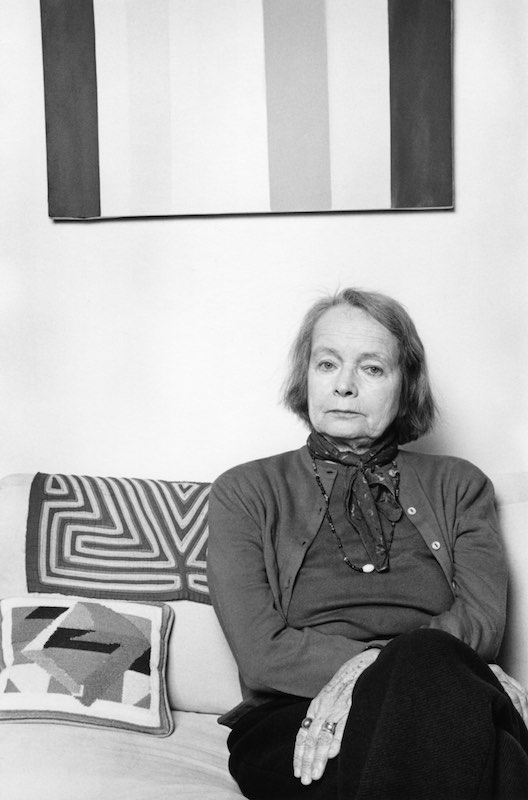
- Parsons photographed by Lynn Gilbert in front of a painting by Calvert Coggeshall (1977)
- Born: Betty Bierne Pierson; January 31, 1900; New York, New York
- Died: July 23, 1982 (aged 82); Southold, New York
- Known for: Painting, Art Dealer, Art Collector
- Movement: Abstract Expressionism
- Spouse: Schuyler Livingston Parsons (m. 1919–1922)
- Partner: Adge Baker

Betty Parsons (born Betty Bierne Pierson, January 31, 1900 – July 23, 1982) was an American artist, art dealer, and collector known for her early promotion of Abstract Expressionism. She is regarded as one of the most influential and dynamic figures of the American avant-garde.

== Early life and education ==
Betty Bierne Pierson was born on January 31, 1900, the second of three daughters. She came from a wealthy New York family that divided its time between New York City, Newport, Palm Beach, and Paris.

At the age of ten, Parsons was enrolled in Miss Chapin's school for girls in New York. She remained at the Chapin School for five years but was a mediocre student who was easily bored. In 1913, Parsons visited the Armory Show, the International Exhibition of Modern Art. She was delighted and inspired by what she saw and described this pivotal moment years later: "It was exciting, full of color and life. I felt like those paintings. I couldn't explain it, but I decided then that this was the world I wanted... art." Although her parents disapproved, she soon began studying art in the studio of Gutzon Borglum, whom she described as a poor teacher.

In 1919, Parsons married Schuyler Livingston Parsons, an affluent, New York City socialite ten years her senior. Her family hoped that Parsons would settle down into a conventional lifestyle, but the couple divorced in Paris, only three years later on the grounds of incompatibility, and as a result, her family disinherited her. Parsons remained in Paris and enrolled in the Académie de la Grande Chaumière, where she studied under the sculptors Émile-Antoine Bourdelle (formerly an assistant to Auguste Rodin) and Ossip Zadkine. In the summers, she studied painting with Arthur Lindsey on the coast of Brittany. She bought a small house in Montparnasse where she lived with a British art student, Adge Baker, with whom she had a romantic relationship. The two separated in 1932, but remained lifelong friends.

In 1933, after losing her alimony support in the Great Depression, Parsons returned to America. She first traveled to Santa Barbara, California, where she taught sculpture classes for a short time. In 1936, she moved back to New York and had her first solo exhibition in New York at Midtown Gallery. Her watercolor paintings were well-received, and referred to in one review as "delightful" and "interestingly conceived". She would have nine more one-woman shows at Midtown over the next twenty years.

== Gallery employee ==
Following her one-woman show at the Midtown Galleries, owner Alan Bruskin offered Parsons her first gallery job: selling art on commission. That position was short-lived and, in the fall of 1937, Parsons began working at the gallery of Mary Quinn Sullivan, a founding trustee of the Museum of Modern Art, New York.

In 1940, Parsons left Sullivan's gallery and took a position managing a contemporary gallery in the Wakefield Bookshop at 64 East 55th Street. This was her first job managing a gallery on her own; she had full curatorial control regarding artists and exhibitions. She was soon representing many contemporary artists, including Saul Steinberg, Adolph Gottlieb, Alfonso Ossorio, Hedda Sterne, Theodoros Stamos, and Joseph Cornell.

In September 1944, after four years at the Wakefield Gallery, Parsons was invited to start and manage a contemporary art division in the gallery of art dealer Mortimer Brandt. When Brandt moved to England after the war, Parsons subleased the space from him and opened her own gallery at the urging of her artists.

== Gallerist ==
The Betty Parsons Gallery opened in 1946 at 15 East 57th Street in Manhattan. The gallery regularly exhibited twelve shows a season, from September to May, with each show lasting only two to three weeks. At a time when the market for avant-garde American art was minuscule, Parsons was the only dealer willing to represent artists like Jackson Pollock after Peggy Guggenheim closed her Art of This Century gallery and returned to Europe in 1947. Parsons showed work by William Congdon, Clyfford Still, Theodoros Stamos, Ellsworth Kelly, Boris Margo, Mark Rothko, Hedda Sterne, Forrest Bess, Michael Loew, Lyman Kipp, Judith Godwin, and Sari Dienes, among others. In 1950, she gave Barnett Newman, whom she had met in 1943, his first solo show; Rothko and Tony Smith assisted with the installation. In 1951, on Clyfford Still's recommendation, she boldly gave Robert Rauschenberg his first solo show, and although failing to sell a single work, it was Rauschenberg's gift of one of them to John Cage who had visited her gallery, that led to many of their major collaborative impacts on the contemporary arts scene. Later in the 1950s, Smith and Newman helped to remodel Parsons' gallery, creating an almost cube-shaped main space framed by white walls with subtly curved corners and a concrete floor whose proportions fitted their ordered works. Helen Frankenthaler, the painter, who met Parsons in 1950, said, "Betty and her gallery helped construct the center of the art world. She was one of the last of her breed." Many of the Abstract Expressionist artists she had launched left her gallery for more commercial galleries, such as Sam Kootz and Sidney Janis. Art critic B. H. Friedman noted, "She was resentful. She had struggled so long to get them established, and other dealers capitalized on her efforts."

She later moved on to a younger generation of American artists, including Mino Argento, José Bernal, Ib Benoh, Jasper Johns, Agnes Martin, Richard Pousette-Dart, Jeanne Reynal, Walter Tandy Murch, Leon Polk Smith, Richard Tuttle, Robert Yasuda, Jack Youngerman, and Oliver Steindecker (who was Mark Rothko's last assistant) among others. She ran the gallery until her death in 1982, after which it was taken over by her former gallery assistant Jack Tilton (1951–2017) who then transformed it into his own establishment. Her friend of many years, painter Lee Hall became a partner at Betty Parsons Gallery starting in 1983 and Hall later wrote Parsons biography.

=== Artists: employee-clients ===
Parsons was generous in promoting artists. She never refused walk-in artists with their artwork. Always encouraging and caring, she often gave critiques on the spot. Parsons nurtured the artists who assisted her and they were encouraged to show at her gallery. Richard Tuttle had his first show a year after he began assisting Betty Parsons. Thomas Nozkowski worked for her after graduating from Cooper Union. Parsons showed his sculptures. In 1980, Ib Benoh began working for Betty Parsons as her assistant and that same year she included him in a group show, adding Benoh to her list of gallery artists.

== Painter and sculptor ==
Parsons was also a painter, but her great love was sculpture, which she couldn't afford. In 1959, Tony Smith designed her waterfront house-studio on the North Fork of the east end of Long Island, New York, perched on a cliff overlooking Long Island Sound, where Parsons worked on her art in her time off from the gallery. Her painting style changed in 1947, turning from small landscapes and portraits into a bold, subjective abstraction when she began to make constructions from bits of wood and other materials that washed up on the beach near her home; most often her constructions reflected the area around her North Fork home, but sometimes the pieces reflected her travels to the Caribbean and abroad.

During her lifetime, Parsons received important solo exhibitions at the Whitechapel Gallery, London (1968), the Montclair Art Museum, New Jersey (1974) and Nigel Greenwood Gallery, London (1980). Following her death, the Pollock-Krasner House and Study Center of East Hampton showed her paintings on paper in 1992; that same year, the Fine Arts Gallery of the Southampton Campus of Long Island University exhibited painted wood "constructions". Her work has also been exhibited at a number of other galleries, including the Anita Shapolsky Gallery, New York; Spanierman Gallery, New York; and Virginia Miller Galleries in Coral Gables, Florida.

Parsons is now represented by Alexander Gray Associates, New York, and Alison Jacques Gallery, London.

== Legacy ==
Parsons' work is held in the collections of the Whitney Museum of American Art, New York; Smithsonian American Art Museum, Washington, DC; and the Museum of Modern Art, New York; Her personal papers and those from the Betty Parsons Gallery are held at the Archives of American Art.

Her image is included in the iconic 1972 poster Some Living American Women Artists by Mary Beth Edelson.

In 2016 her biography was included in the exhibition catalogue Women of Abstract Expressionism organized by the Denver Art Museum.

In 2023 her work was included in the exhibition Action, Gesture, Paint: Women Artists and Global Abstraction 1940-1970 at the Whitechapel Gallery in London.

== See also ==
- Art Students League of New York
- New York School
