= Viktor Romanov (painter) =

Russian painter

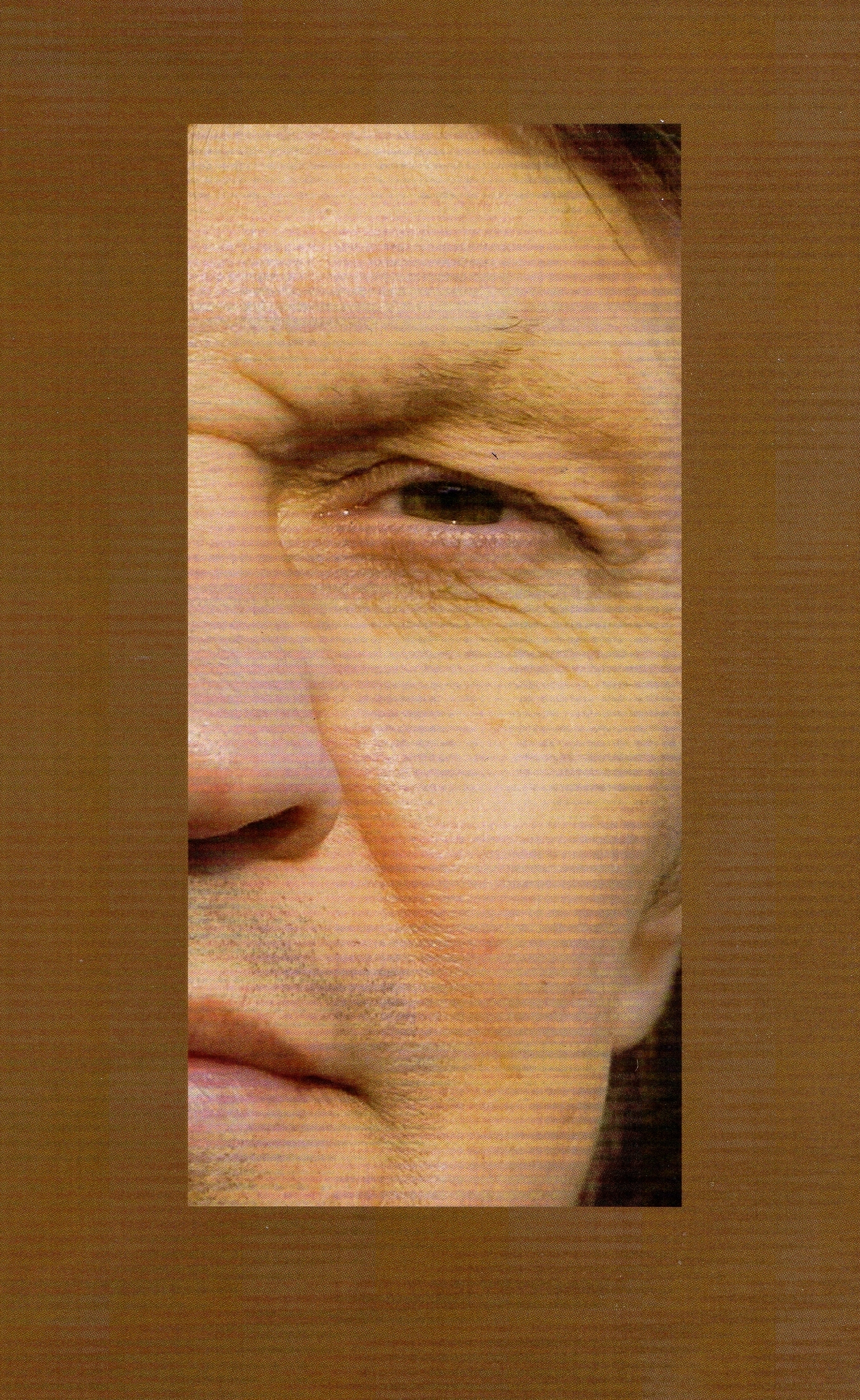
- Born: 1959 (age 66–67); Zilairsky sovkhoz, Bashkir Soviet Socialist Republic, USSR
- Known for: Painting, drawing
- Movement: Hypergeometrism

Viktor Mikhailovich Romanov (born 1959 in Bashkir Soviet Socialist Republic, USSR) is a Russian painter, founder of hypergeometrizm.

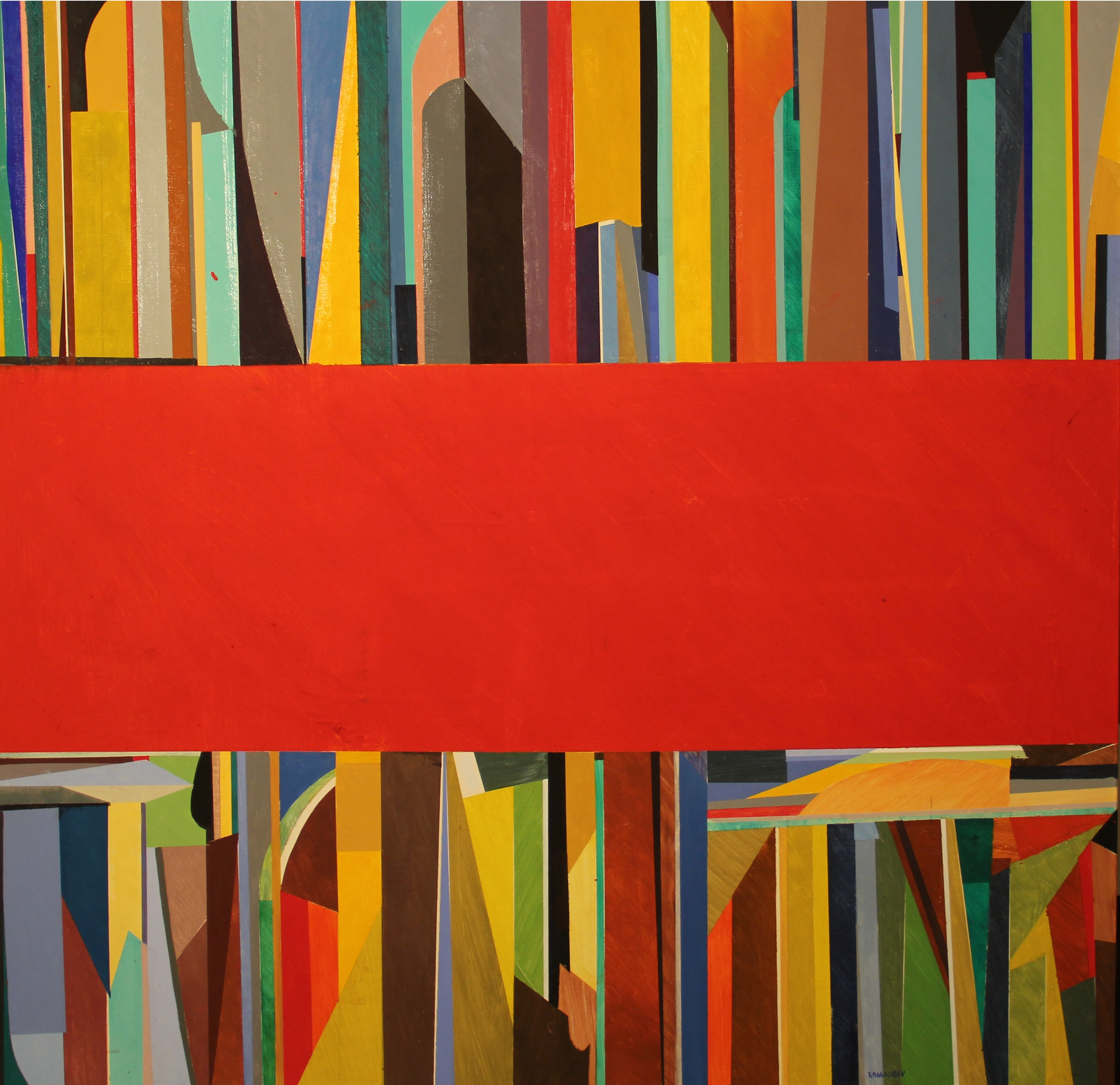
The Red Stripe - One of the most famous paintings

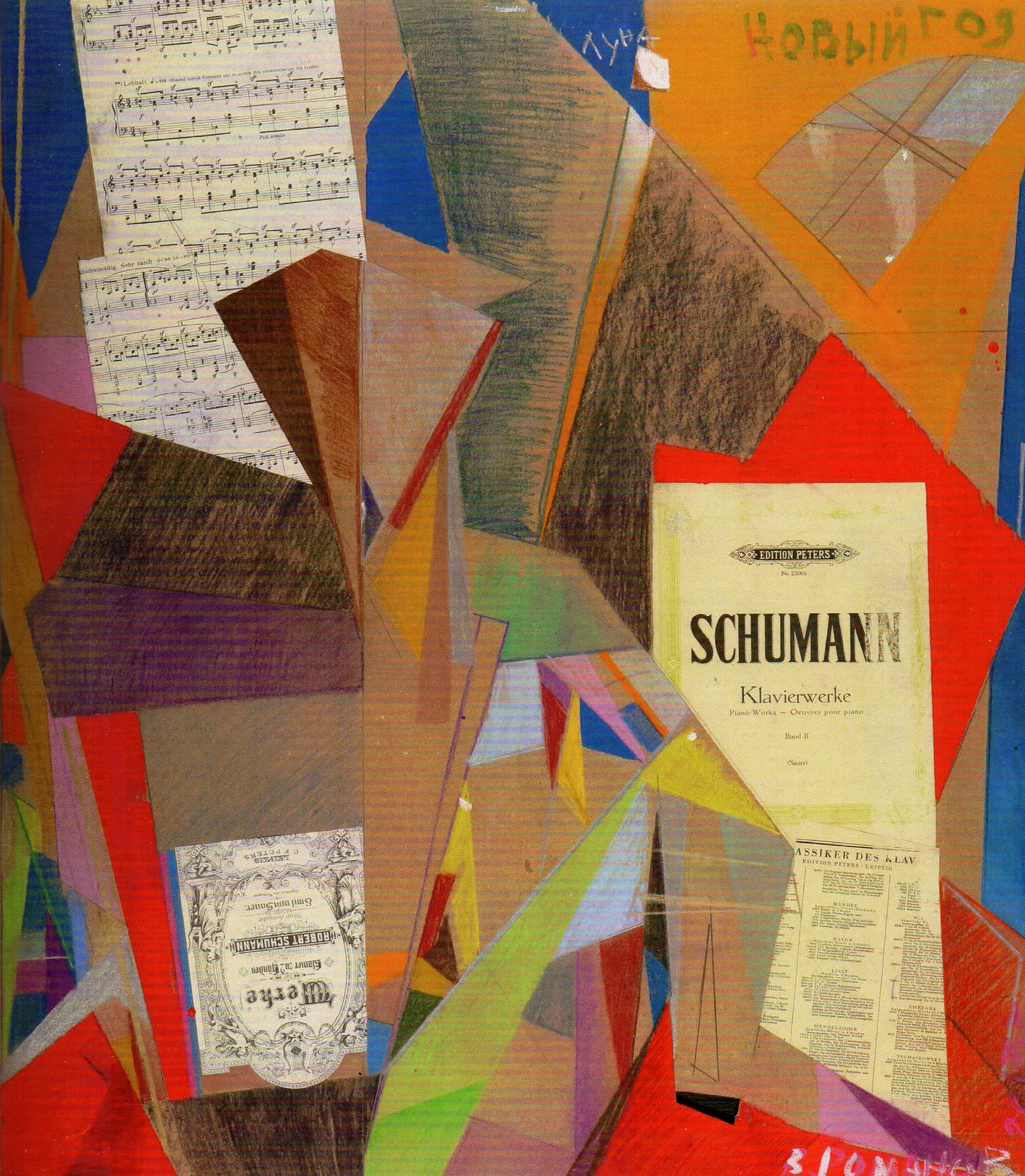
another painting from the middle period

== Biography ==
Since 1967 lives in Siberia, Khanty-Mansiysk District-Yugra, Surgut. Secondary education. Does not have any professional art education. In 1983—1985 studied in Moscow. He tried to engage in literature, theater, fashion. The first exhibition held in recreation center of "Izvestia" newspaper in 1984 and then solo exhibition at the youth center. Participated in more than 25 exhibitions. He was a curator of eight exhibitions.
The period, conforming to the laws of nature was Hypergeometrizm. Before Hypergeometrizm were impressionism, abstract, expressionism, hyperrealism ... "... Viktor Romanov, learning the complicated laws of fine arts, he proved himself a skillful painter, landscape painter, portraitist, the author of the lyric and the story pictures, however, his talent in full force revealed in a fantastic, multicolor and symbolic abstract paintings.
In his oeuvre he came to the period of blossom of his talent. "(Nikandr Maltsev, academician, professor. 04.05.2009)." ... The artist's painting differs in lyrical interpretation of images of nature and man in the tradition of Russian symbolism, impressionism, abstract art. ... "(Yuri Bobrov, doctor of Arts, Corresponding member of the Russian Academy of Arts. Professor. 23.10.2008). "... It affects primarily by range from full-scale sketches, to abstracted spaces, expressed and developed in color and rhythm. ..." (Gennady Raishev, Honored artist of Russia, Corresponding member of the Russian Academy of Arts. 01/12/2015).

== Selected exhibitions and curatorial projects ==
- 2017 – "The first exhibition of hyergeometrism", historical-cultural center (journalists house).
- 2015 - "State Art Museum", Khanty-Mansiysk District-Yugra, Khanty-Mansiysk. The exhibition "From Impressionism to gipergeometrizma. Personal exhibition V.Romanova "VODA.ZHIZN.NAROD" Russkinskaya - Khanty-Mansiysk 2015 ", (with the publication of the exhibition catalog).
- 2015 – the Russkinskaya Village, Khanty-Mansiysk District-Yugra, Surgut. The exhibition "From Impressionism to gipergeometrizma. Personal exhibition V.Romanova "VODA.ZHIZN.NAROD" Russkinskaya - Khanty-Mansiysk 2015 ", (with the publication of the exhibition catalog).
- 2011 - "49 zhekle interior." Exhibition. "RETURN" Author's project. Salon-shop "Kingdom of doors and parquet", Surgut.
- 2007 - Langepas. Exhibition of painting and easel graphics. Recreation house "Neftyanik" (2010 - the Central Committee of "Neftyanik").
- 2003 - Surgut Philharmonic exhibition.
- 1990 - "The first exhibition of young avant-garde artists of Surgut". Surgut History Museum with the support of TSRMI and CM "Magnit".
- 1989 - "The first exhibition of contemporary art in Surgut". RH "Energetic" supported TSRMI.
- 1987 - Surgut. Exhibition of easel graphics. DC "Energetic", (2003 - Surgut Philharmonic).
- 1984 - Moscow. Exhibition of paintings and graphics. Recreation house of "Izvestia" the newspaper.
- First exhibited sculpture "Dance" (three pieces). Tree. Height 45 cm. The original location is not known.

== Interesting facts ==
In 2015 has been included in a long-list of the award "Innovation" (the regional project)

== Selected works ==
- In the morning (1989)
- Ugorian Madonna (1991)
- Fallen angel (2001)
- Hypergeometrical composition of A1 (2012)
- Hypergeometrical composition No. 4 (2012)
- Hypergeometrical composition No. 5 (2012)
- 21st century (triptych) (2014)
- She and a painter (2014)

== Editions ==
- N. Maltsev - "Victor Romanov" (an album of early works), “News of Ugra” publishing house 2012
- V. Romanov - "Hypergeometrizm" (an album, the manifesto of hyipergeometrizm), TN printing house, 2014
- V. Romanov - the Exhibition catalog "From impressionism to a hyipergeometrizm ", TN printing house, 2015

== See also ==
- Avant-garde
- Abstract art
- Geometric abstraction
- Kazimir Malevich
