= Joe Doyle =

Joe or Joseph Doyle may refer to:

- Joe Doyle (artist) (born 1941), American artist
- Joe Doyle (cyclist) (1933–2012), Irish road racing cyclist and cycle sport administrator
- Joe Doyle (musician) (born 1977), Irish musician
- Joe Doyle (politician) (1936–2009), Irish Fine Gael politician
- Joe Doyle (rugby league, born 1894) (1884–?), English rugby league footballer
- Joe Doyle (rugby league, born 1912) (1912–1995), Australian rugby league player
- Joseph Doyle (baseball), part of the original ownership team of what became the Brooklyn Dodgers
- Joseph Doyle (economist), health economist and Erwin H. Schell Professor of Management and Applied Economics at the MIT Sloan School of Management
- Joseph Doyle (pioneer) (1817–1864), trapper, trader, lawyer, legislator and founder of Doyle Settlement
- Joseph A. Doyle (1920–2014), U.S. Assistant Secretary of the Navy (Manpower and Reserve Affairs) 1979–1981
- Joseph T. Doyle (1931–2012), Pennsylvania politician
- Slow Joe Doyle (1881–1947), pitcher for the New York Highlanders and Cincinnati Reds from 1906 to 1910
- USCGC Joseph Doyle, a USCG Sentinel-class cutter, and its namesake, Joseph O. Doyle, US Coast Guard radioman
