= Joe Doyle (artist) =

American artist (1941–2020)

- Born: Joe Doyle; February 27, 1941; New York City, New York
- Died: April 7, 2020 (aged 79)
- Education: San Francisco State University
- Known for: Painting
- Movement: Abstract Illusionism

Joe Doyle (February 27, 1941 – April 7, 2020) was an American artist. He was one of the original painters of abstract illusionism of the 1970s and has since evolved his style using computerized technologies to create Digital art.

== Life and work ==
Doyle established himself as a painter during the movement toward new abstraction in San Francisco in the mid-seventies. Stylistically, his work evolved from photo-realist aircraft renderings, which exaggerated differences in background and foreground focus." By 1975, his imagery shifted to arrangements of flat, geometric forms and tubular squiggles in a trompe-l'œil manner, creating the illusion of a multi-layered, three-dimensional space. By the late 1970s, Doyle, James Havard, Jack Reilly, and others had attained national prominence by working in this style now referred to as Abstract Illusionism. Doyle and others were included in 'Reality of Illusion', a large touring exhibition of primarily American illusionist artists organized by the University of Southern California and The Denver Art Museum.

According to an interview by Mark Levy in the January/February 1982 issue of Art Voices, Doyle began his artistic career in the Air Force, where he says he was relieved of difficult assignments and encouraged to paint by a sergeant who appreciated his realistic landscape paintings. However, when he began painting abstractly, the sergeant relegated him to K.P. duty. Following the Air Force, Doyle enrolled at San Francisco State College, receiving his M.A. in 1971. From 1971 to 1975, he was a photo-realist transferring images from photographs using airbrush techniques on canvas, occasionally adding political satire into the subject matter, as in "Ice House (1971).

Doyle was an instructor and co-founder of the Multi-Media Arts Department at Berkeley City College. In 2010, then Berkeley Mayor Tom Bates and the Berkeley City Council recognized Doyle and the Berkeley City College’s Digital Arts Club (DAC) for "its talent, creativity, and many years of artistic contributions to Bay Area galleries and exhibits." His most recent work delves into the realm of both 3-D realism and 3-D non-objective abstraction. In 2017, he released a new series titled "New Abstracts" employing 3-D modeling and color fields to create an illusion of 3-dimensional space.

In early 2020, Joe experienced coronary issues and underwent heart surgery. Complications during recovery led to pneumonia and what doctors believed to be COVID-19. He died on April 7, 2020. A memorial page can be found at ForeverMissed.com.

== Solo exhibitions ==
- Nuage, Environment for Contemporary Art, Los Angeles 1977
- Foster Goldstrom Fine Arts, San Francisco, CA Foster Goldstrom Fine Arts, San Francisco
- San Jose Museum of Fine Art, San Jose, 1979
- O. K. Harris West, Scottsdale 1981
- Route 66 Gallery, Philadelphia, PA, Foster Goldstrom Fine Arts, San Francisco, 1982
- Foster Goldstrom Fine Arts, San Francisco, 1983
- Route 66 Gallery, Philadelphia, 1984
- Foster Goldstrom Gallery, Dallas, 1985
- J. Rosenthal Fine Arts, Chicago, 1985
- Illinois Metropolitan Center, Chicago, 1986
- "Joe Doyle New Work", Harcourts Contemporary, San Francisco, 1988
- Kennedy Art Center, Holy Names College, Oakland, 1990
- Harcourt's Contemporary Gallery, San Francisco, 1991
- Artists Gallery, San Francisco, 2008

== Group exhibitions ==
- "Arts and Industry," Brooks Hall, San Francisco, 1971
- "Options 73/30," Contemporary Ar~ Center, Cincinnati, 1973
- San Jose Museum of Art, San Jose, 1975
- "Art for Collecting and Giving, San Francisco Museum of Modern Art, San Francisco, 1977
- "Six East Bay Painters," Oakland Museum of Art, Oakland, 1977
- "The Annual," San Francisco Art Institute, San Francisco, 1977
- "Bay Area Artist," Oakland Museum of Art, Oakland, 1977
- "Aesthetics of Graffiti," San Francisco Museum of Modern Art, San Francisco, 1978
- "Reality of Illusion, University of Southern California, Touring Show, 1979
- Selections from the Contemporary Art Collection of the Oakland Museum," Kaiser Center, Oakland, 1980
- "George Irwin Collection, Krannert Museum, IL, 1980
- Palo Alto Cultural Center, Palo Alto, 1980
- "The Controlled Gesture -Aspects of Bay Area Abstraction," 1980
- Midwestern Museum of Art, Elkhorn, IN, 1981
- "The Goldstrom Collection," Davenport Art Center, Davenport, IA (National tour), 1988
- "Four from California," Yozo Ueda Gallery, Tokyo, 1988
- Art of Jingletown, Oakland Museum of California, Oakland, 2006
- Printing on the Edge, Alameda Historical Museum, Alameda, CA, 2009
- Thinking Big, Gualala Art Center, Gualala, CA, 2009
- Oakland Symphony Showcase, Oakland, 2010

== See also ==
- Abstract Illusionism
