= Bryce Hudson =

Moroccan-American painter (born 1979)

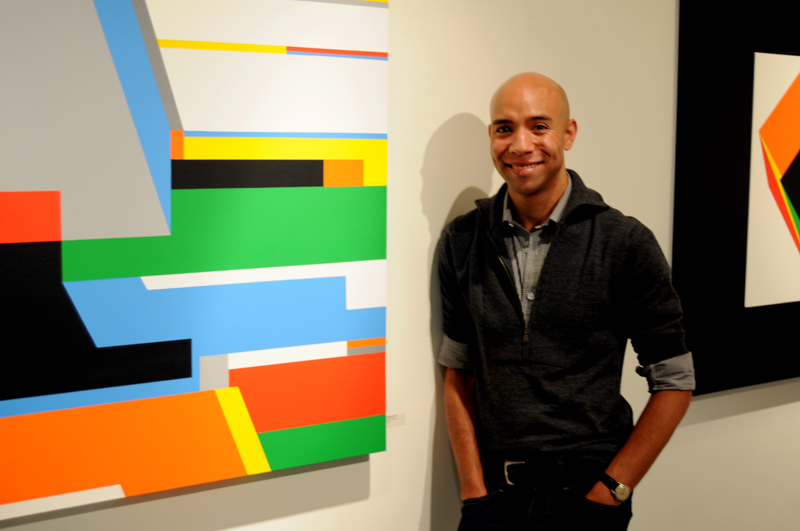
- Bryce Hudson
- Born: March 29, 1979; Rabat, Morocco
- Education: Kent State University
- Known for: Painting, murals, psychology
- Movement: Abstract art, cubism, geometric abstraction, neoclassicism
- Patrons: Brown-Forman Corporation, Matthew Barzun, Henry Schein Corporation

Bryce Hudson (March 29, 1979, Rabat, Morocco) is a Moroccan-American Neo-plasticist (De Stijl) painter. Hudson's early geometric paintings explore race and stereotypes through means of the Geometric abstraction style. Later in his career, influenced by the theories of Constructivism the paintings and wall sculptures referenced abstracted architectural and spatial elements. His printmaking combines movements in art history such as Minimalism and Rococo.

Along with contemporaries Pierre Clerk and Ilya Bolotowsky, Hudson works within a small set of artist working within the Neo-Plastic style - not adhering to strict rules, but exploring the depth and future of geometric abstract art.

== Life ==
Bryce Hudson was born in Rabat, Morocco and adopted into an American family as an infant. He studied painting, psychology, and sculpture at Kent State University School of Fine Art. In a 1999 exhibit at the Speed Museum, he explored mixed-race and psychological influences of race and identity in contemporary society.

== Notable exhibits, awards, and medals ==
- 1999 – Beyond The Walls - Speed Art Museum, Louisville KY.
- 2006 – Contemporary Geometric Abstraction - Mason Muir Fine Art, Atlanta, Georgia
- 2007 – Finding Family - 21c Museum Hotel, Louisville, KY
- 2008 – Neue Perspektiven in der Malerei (New Perspectives in Painting) - Tsinghua University, Beijing, China
- 2010 – Embracing Ambiguities – California State University, Fullerton, California
- 2011 – Art Taipei – Taipei, Taiwan
- 2012 – Thomas More College – Cincinnati, Ohio
- 2012 – Koru Contemporary – Hong Kong, HK
- 2012 – East African Art Biennale – Dar es Salaam, Tanzania, Africa
- 2014 – Art Miami – The Duane Reed Gallery
- 2015 – Koru Contemporary Art Center – Hong Kong, HK
