= George D. Green =

American painter (1943–2020)

George D. Green (1943–2020) was an American abstract illusionist painter, with vividly colored paintings that featured trompe l'oeil abstractions. He graduated from the University of Oregon.
