= Michael B. Gallagher =

American painter

Michael Gallagher
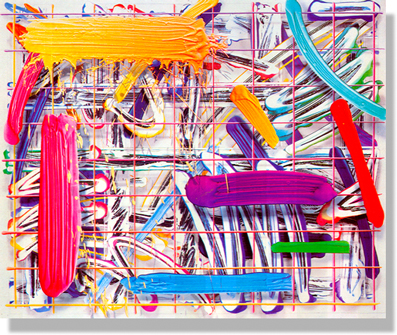
- Pralaya, 1978, 60" x 72", acrylic / canvas, Guggenheim Museum, New York City
- Born: 1945 (age 80–81); Los Angeles, California,
- Education: University of Southern California, Yale University
- Known for: Painting
- Movement: Abstract Expressionism, Abstract Illusionism, Lyrical Abstraction, digital painting
- Awards: 1967 Yale-Norfolk Summer School Grantee

Michael B. Gallagher (born 1945) is an American painter whose work is associated with Abstract Illusionism.

== Life ==
Born and raised in Los Angeles, California, in 1964-68 he received a Bachelor of Fine Arts from the University of Southern California. In 1967 he was a Yale-Norfolk Summer School Grantee, and In 1970 he received a Master of Fine Arts from Yale University.

== Public collections ==
Museums:
The Metropolitan Museum of Art, New York, NY
The Solomon R. Guggenheim Museum, New York, NY
Frederick R. Weisman Art Foundation, Beverly Hills, CA
Butler Institute of American Art, Youngstown, Ohio
Albany Museum of Art, Georgia
University of Arizona Museum of Art (Tucson, AZ), Tucson, AZ
Erie Art Museum, Erie, PA
Smithsonian Institution, Washington, D.C.
Wharton School of Business, Philadelphia, PA
Jewish Museum, New York, NY
Bryant University, Smithfield, RI

== Exhibitions ==
- 2008–09 "Art & Illusion", Susquehanna Art Museum, Harrisburg, PA
- 2008 "Reflections from the Artist's Eye", Frederick Weisman Museum of Art, Pepperdine University, Malibu, CA
- 2008 "Inaugural exhibit at Roseville's Blue Line", Blue Line Gallery, Roseville, CA
- 2006 "Art and Illusion: Selections from the Frederick R. Weisman Art Foundation", Bakersfield Museum of Art, Bakersfield, CA
- 2005 "Made in California", Frederick Weisman Museum of Art, Pepperdine University, Malibu, CA
- 2004 "Sketchbook 88: Jean-Michel Basquiat, Georges Braque, Marc Chagall, Dale Chihuly, Richard Diebenkorn, Ronald Davis, Richard Estes, Sam Francis, Helen Frankenthaler, Michael Gallagher, Keith Haring, Michael Heizer, David Hockney, Robert Indiana, Jasper Johns, Mark Kostabi, Alex Katz, Roy Lichtenstein, Mel Ramos, Robert Motherwell, Helmut Newton, Kenneth Noland, Pablo Picasso, Gerhard Richter, Susan Rothenberg, Todd Rundgren, Thomas Ruff, Larry Rivers, James Rosenquist, Julian Schnabel, Frank Stella, Donald Sultan, David Salle, Cy Twombly, Rufino Tamayo, William Wegman, Andy Warhol", Galerie Sho Contemporary Art, Tokyo, Japan
- 1999 Louis K. Meisel Gallery, New York, NY
- 1995 Louis K. Meisel Gallery, New York, NY

== Additional sources ==
Piepho, Rob, Palm Springs Art Magazine.com, Spring, 2017, "Forgotten Beauty", Art Patron talks to Michael Gallagher and Jack Reilly

Thorpe, Carole, Westways: May June, 2008, "Art that Moves You".
Belnapp, Susan, OC Metro Business: April, 2008, "The Art of Mike Gallagher".
Dalkey, Victoria, The Sacramento Bee: February 29, 2008, “Big space, big show Inaugural exhibit at Roseville's Blue Line suggests a bright future”.
Wylder, Greer, Greer's OC: November 21, 2007, "Art that Moves You".
Montgomery, Tiffany, Shop-Eat-Surf.com:, November 14, 2007, "Surfing as Art, a Talk with Michael Gallagher".
Dr. Leda Cempellin. "Abstract Illusionism: A Perspective," Hawaii International Conference on Arts and Humanities Honolulu: January 12–15, 2007, South Dakota State University.
Edward Lucie-Smith.“American Art Now”: 1986, William Morrow and Company, Inc.
Peter Frank (art critic). "Abstract inflected by Illusion: a Recent History, in Breaking the Plane: Stuart M. Speiser Collection" (New York: Louis K. Meisel Gallery), 1984.
Jane K. Bledsoe. "Centric 9 – Trompe L’Oeil Abstraction', The University Art Museum, California State University, Long Beach, October 11-30th,1983.
Atkins, Robert. Architectural Digest: 1983, April, “Art to Intrigue the Eye”.
