= James Havard =

American painter, sculptor (1937–2020)

- Born: James Pinkney Havard; 1937; Galveston, Texas, United States
- Died: December 15, 2020 (aged 82–83); Texas, United States
- Education: Sam Houston State College,
- Known for: Painting, sculpture
- Movement: abstract illusionism, abstract expressionism
- Children: 2

James Pinkney Havard (1937 – December 15, 2020) was an American painter and sculptor. He was a pioneer of abstract illusionism in the 1970s. In the 1980s he changed his style into a form of abstract expressionism influenced by Native American and tribal cultures as well as outsider art. Drawing inspiration from outsider and tribal art, Havard stands within a tradition that includes such notable artists as Paul Gauguin, Cy Twombly, Jean Dubuffet, Jean-Michel Basquiat, and Joseph Beuys.

== Early life, family, and education ==
James Pinkney Havard was born in 1937, in Galveston, Texas.

He received a bachelor of science degree in art from Sam Houston State College (now Sam Houston State University) in Huntsville, Texas, in 1959. From 1961 to 1965 he studied at Pennsylvania Academy of the Fine Arts in Philadelphia, Pennsylvania, and has a 1967 CFA degree.

Havard was married three times: Charlotte Liles (1958–1961), Elizabeth "Buffie" Corson Beardsley (1965–1974), and Catherine Bruni (1985–1989). He has two children, Inga Renee Esterak Posey (b. 1960) and Houston James Havard (b. 1985), from his first and third marriages respectively.

== Career ==
There he was influenced by realist painters Ben Kamihira and Hobson Pittman. His career can be divided into three broad periods: realism (1960s), abstract illusionism (1970s), and abstract expressionism with tribal and outsider influences (1980s and beyond). “His early work was . . . realistic and traditional, including landscapes, churches, and figuration much in the same styles as Camille Corot, Édouard Manet, and Edgar Degas.”

Beginning in 1967, he broke away from realism and went through a period of experimentation with various abstract and contemporary styles (e.g., monochromatic paintings).

By the late 1970s Havard was considered one of the founders of abstract illusionism along with Al Held, Jack Lembeck, John Clem Clarke, George D. Green, and Tony King. His work during this period is characterized by pastel colors, “optical illusions and combinations of gesso wipes, chalk scrawls, incised lines, and squirts of paint directly from the tube.” In 1976, one art critic wrote of his paintings, "Though conceived to fool the eye, Havard's paintings are at once daring and subtle, complex in scheme and simplistic in symbolic reference."

He moved to New York in 1977 and took frequent trips to Santa Fe, New Mexico, beginning in 1978. In New York, his color palette darkened and his works became richer in texture. He began including Native American images and Native American words (e.g., mimbres) inscribed in loose script as well as random numbers. During the 1980s Havard’s paintings began to include thicker layers of paint, more collage elements, and fewer squiggles of paint and optical illusions.

He moved to Santa Fe in 1989 where he continued to develop his style, ultimately freeing himself from all references to abstract illusionism. His later paintings have fewer overt tribal references and are smaller in size than many of his earlier pieces. One critic accused Havard's paintings of "display[ing] the female body with what comes off as a misogynistic vigor." Havard began to use an encaustic medium that allowed him to incise the surface of the painting which gave them a carved, luminous appearance. His palette varies from dark, rich, and contrasting colors to bright blues and reds. Rich textures and visually arresting but crudely rendered figures define his work. Many of his paintings seem visually dense. One collector of Havard's paintings remembered his initial uniformed response to them: "What a mixed up mess these are."

In 2006 Havard suffered a stroke, and was no longer able to walk but he continued to paint. Due to Havard's limited mobility, his later works are small in scale, but "are nonetheless extremely powerful, perhaps even more so because the reduced format concentrates them."

== Death and legacy ==
Havard died at home in December, 2020.

Havard's work is in the permanent collection of museums, including at the Solomon R. Guggenheim Museum (New York City), Smithsonian Institution (Washington, D.C.), Metropolitan Museum of Art (New York City), Museum of Modern Art (Stockholm, Sweden), Tucson Museum of Art (Arizona), and the Los Angeles County Museum (California).

== Bibliography ==
- Sasse, Julie. James Havard. New York: Hudson Hills Press, 2006.
- McKanic, Arlene. “The Figure 2001,” Artnews, March 2002.
- Korotkin, Joyce. “James Havard,” The New York Art World, April 2001.
- Kolpas, Norman. "Expert Guidance," Southwest Art 29, no. 3 (Aug. 1999): 74-78.
- Polsky, Richard. “Allan Stone Gallery,” Art Market Guide: Contemporary American Art, 1998, 174.
- Haggerty, Gerard. “James Havard,” Artnews (June 1997): 128.
- Cavanaugh, Tony. “James Havard's powerful paint personages have real presence,” Artspeak March 1997.
- Bell, J. Boyer. “Spring Group Exhibition,” Review Art, June 1996, 31.
- McCormack, Ed. “Four Diverse Talents and James Havard solo show at Allan Stone,” Artspeak, Spring 1996, 4.
- “James Havard,” Santa Fe Magazine, October 1991.
- Lipton, E.C. “Opposites in Art,” Artspeak, March 16, 1990.
- Ratcliff, Carter. “The Collectors: An American Palette,” Architectural Digest, May 1986, 205.

== See also ==
- Abstract Illusionism
