= Jack Reilly (artist) =

American painter

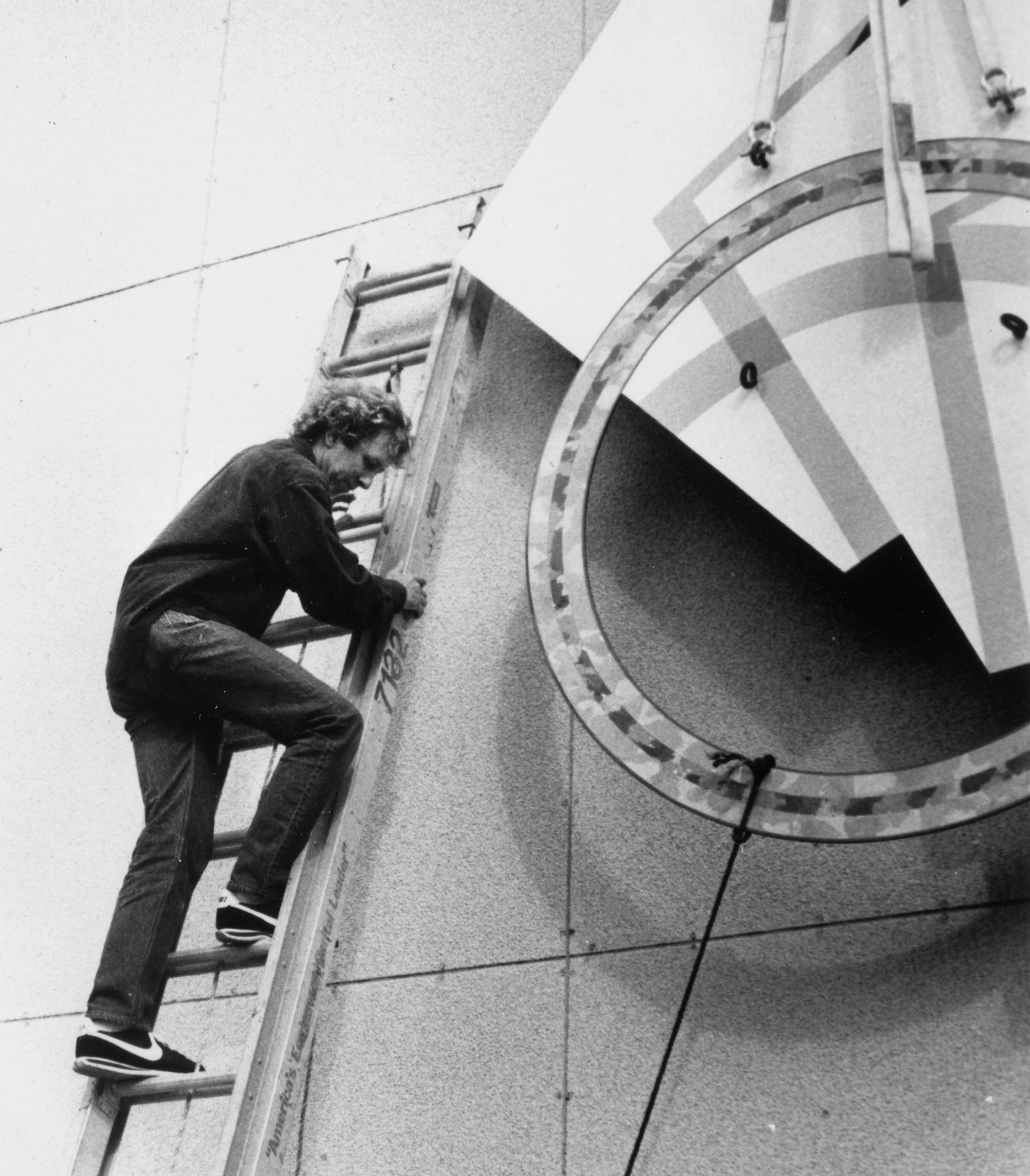
- Jack Reilly installing public art commission
- Born: 1950 (age 75–76)
- Known for: Painting
- Awards: National Endowment for the Arts grant, Arizona Commission on the Arts grant
- Years active: 1978-current
- Website: www.jackreilly.com

Jack Reilly (born 1950) is an American (Los Angeles) artist known for his complex shaped canvas paintings. His work is widely exhibited and included in public and private collections internationally.

== Work ==
Reilly's early abstract paintings reflected various influences of prominent artists of the time including Frank Stella, Ellsworth Kelly, Ronald Davis, Jules Olitski, and Trevor Bell. Each of these abstract painters dealt with structure, color, atmosphere, light and ambiguous space; elements that would eventually converge in Reilly's abstract paintings. Shortly after moving to Los Angeles in 1978, Reilly's geometric abstraction emerged, extracting and redefining elements prevalent in contemporary abstract painting. His work commented on numerous formal and pictorial issues of the era, and by combining illusionary space with color field painting, Reilly created a synthesis of geometric abstraction and pictorial depth, which is also referred to as Abstract Illusionism. In 1979 Reilly's work was exhibited in his first solo show in Los Angeles at the Molly Barnes Gallery. That same year, curator Donald Brewer included Reilly's painting in a major museum exhibition entitled "The Reality of Illusion," an international survey of painting and sculpture that explored trompe-l'œil in both abstract and representational art. The exhibition opened at the Denver Art Museum and traveled throughout the United States for two years.

By 1980, Reilly's paintings were represented by galleries in major American cities including the Molly Barnes Gallery in Los Angeles, Aaron Berman Gallery in New York, Foster Goldstrom Fine Arts in San Francisco and Marilyn Butler Gallery in Scottsdale. Articles and reviews on Reilly's shaped canvas paintings were subsequently published in Arts Magazine, Art Week, and the Los Angeles Times, and in books including Inside the L.A. Artist (1988) by Marva Morrow, American Art Now (1985) by Edward Lucie-Smith, and Introduction to Design (1983) by Robin Landa.

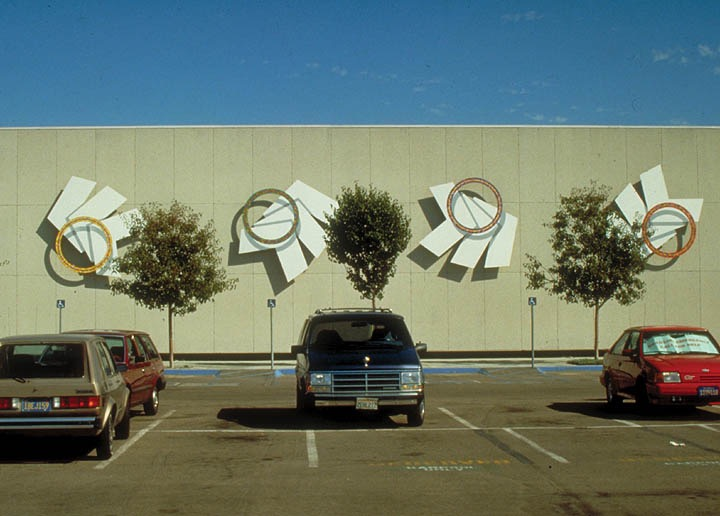
Jack Reilly, Public Art - San Diego, CA 1991

The 1990s yielded large-scale public art and corporate commissions for Reilly with the County of San Diego Public Arts Program and American Airlines at Los Angeles International Airport. In the late 1990s, his paintings evolved in scope as he introduced elements of figure painting and mixed media into his signature shaped canvas artworks. In addition to his work as a contemporary painter, Reilly maintained an active academic career, having taught as professor of art at California State University, Northridge from 1985 to 2001, followed by California State University, Channel Islands 2001–2015, where he developed the university's art department and served as department chair and professor of art. In 2016 he was awarded Professor Emeritus status. Reilly's paintings were included in a 2012 solo exhibition as part of the Getty Foundation initiative, Pacific Standard Time: Art in L.A., 1945-1980, which documented the contributions to Los Angeles contemporary art by artists, curators and critics. In 2016 his work was the subject of a solo retrospective at the California Museum of Art (CMATO) Thousand Oaks, California. Throughout the years, Reilly has mounted over fifty solo exhibitions and remains an extremely prolific painter. His work is included in public collections of the Arizona State University Art Museum, the Oakland Museum of California and numerous corporate collections including Atlantic Richfield (ARCO) and Verizon Communications among others.

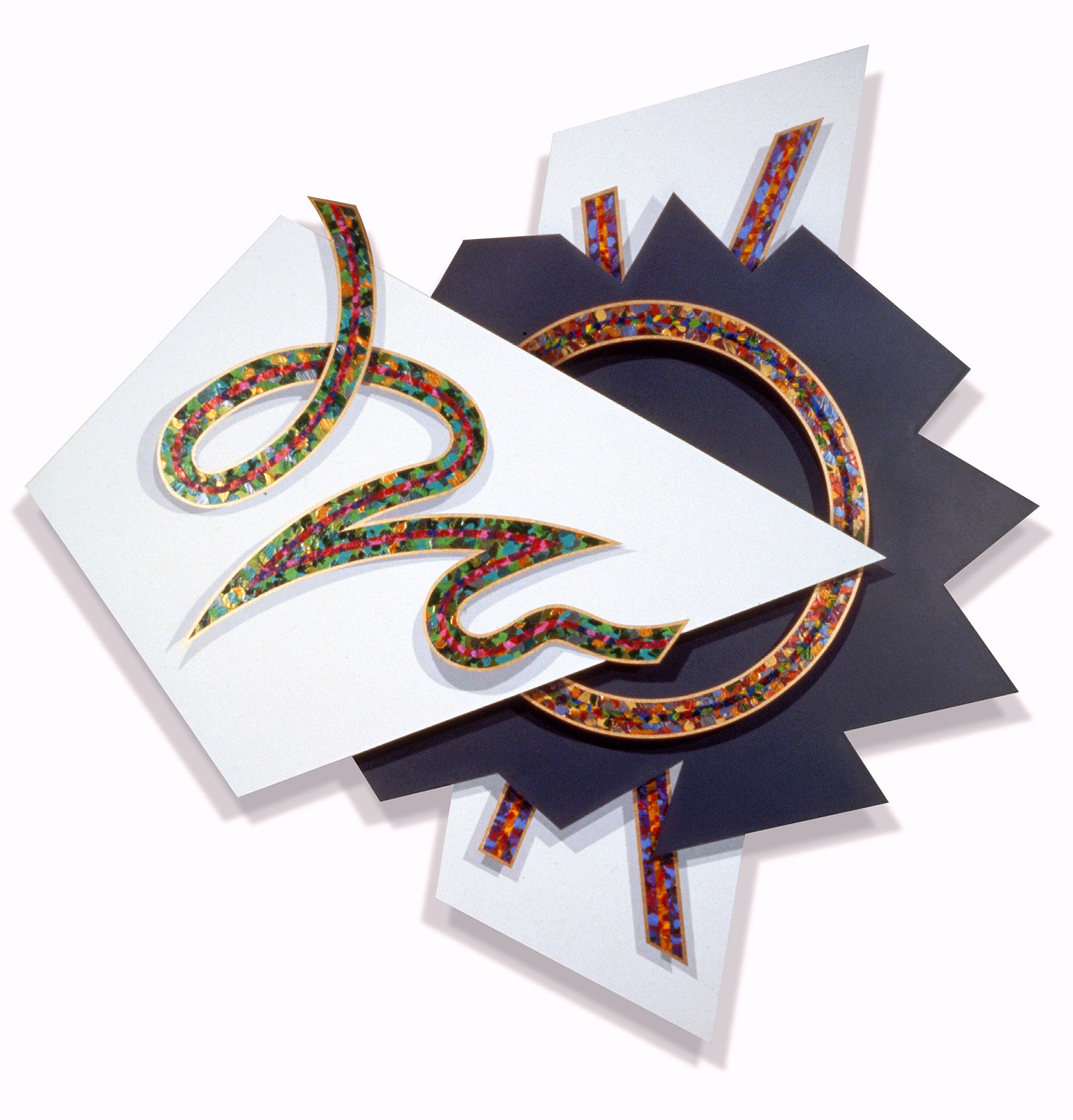
Jack Reilly - Shaped Canvas Painting, 1993

== See also ==
- Geometric abstraction
- Shaped canvas
- Abstract Illusionism
