= Allan D'Arcangelo =

American painter (1930–1998)

- Born: June 16, 1930; Buffalo, New York
- Died: December 17, 1998 (aged 68); New York City
- Education: Mexico City College
- Known for: Painting and Printmaking
- Movement: Pop art, Minimalism, Surrealism, Hard-Edge Painting, Precisionism

Allan D'Arcangelo (June 16, 1930 – December 17, 1998) was an American artist and printmaker, best known for his paintings of highways and road signs that border on pop art and minimalism, precisionism and hard-edge painting, and also surrealism. His subject matter is distinctly American and evokes, at times, a cautious outlook on the future of this country.

== Biography ==
Allan D'Arcangelo was born in Buffalo, New York to Italian immigrant parents. He studied at the University at Buffalo from 1948 to 1953, where he got his bachelor's degree in history. After college, he moved to Manhattan and picked up his studies again at the New School of Social Research and the City University of New York. At this time, he encountered Abstract Expressionist painters who were in vogue at the moment. After joining the army in the mid 1950s, he used the GI Bill to study painting at Mexico City College from 1957 to 1959, driving there over 12 days in an old bakery truck retrofitted as a camper.

However, he returned to New York in 1959, in search of the unique American experience. It was at this time that his painting took on a cool sensibility reminiscent of Roy Lichtenstein and Andy Warhol. However, throughout his life, D'Arcangelo remained politically active, and this is evident in his painting, though not necessarily in an overt way. His interests engaged with the environment, anti-Vietnam War protests, and the commodification and objectification of female sexuality. Through his painting and writings, it is clear that D'Arcangelo had a palpable discomfort with the social mores of his time, which can be read in the detached treatment with which he treated his subjects.

D'Arcangelo first achieved recognition in 1962, when he was invited to contribute an etching to The International Anthology of Contemporary Engraving: America Discovered; his first solo exhibition came the next year, at the Thibaud Gallery in New York City. In 1965 he contributed three screenprints to Original Edition's 11 Pop Artists portfolio. By the 1970s, D'Arcangelo had received significant recognition in the art world. He was well known for his paintings of quintessentially American highways and infrastructure, and in 1971 was commissioned by the Department of the Interior to paint the Grand Coulee Dam in Washington state.

However, his sense of morality always trumped his interest in art world fame. In 1975, he decided to quit the gallery that had been representing him for years, Marlborough Gallery, because of the way they handled Mark Rothko's legacy. This ultimately sealed his fate of exclusion in the art establishment. He retired to a farm in Kenoza Lake with his family, where he continued to paint and even make earth works. Because of this move, D'Arcangelo's legacy is perhaps less well known than it could have been. He was considered a figure who straddled the lines between many styles of art and was hard to categorize. His cool, Pop-like sensibility also met with the usual crisis concerning art movements in the contemporary art world; usually, art movements only last a decade and are then replaced with a new style. However, he did return to the city to continue teaching at Brooklyn College from 1973 to 1992 and the School of Visual Arts from 1982 to 1992, where he had also previously taught from 1963 to 1968. Finally, he died in 1998 in New York City due to complications with leukemia.

== Artistic style ==
D'Arcangelo rejected Abstract Expressionism, though his early work has a painterly and somewhat expressive feel. He quickly turned to a style of art that seemed to border on Pop Art and Minimalism, Precisionism and Hard-Edge painting. Evidently, he didn't fit neatly in the category of Pop Art, though he shared subjects (women, signs, Superman) and techniques (stencil, assemblage) with these artists. To D'Arcangelo, his style was less important than the subject matter he depicted and he believed that a culture of protest and resistance was more meaningful than any aesthetic concerns. And the subject he chose to explore first and foremost was the American experience. At first he touched on specific motifs in the contemporary American consciousness, such as President Kennedy's tragic death in "Place of Assassination" (1965) and environmental concerns in "Can Our National Bird Survive?" (1962). However, he quickly turned to expansive, if detached, scenes of the American highway. These paintings are reminiscent of de Chirico — though perhaps not as interested in isolation — and Dali — though there is a stronger interest in the present and disinterest in the past. These paintings also have a sharp quality that is reminiscent of the Precisionist style, or, more specifically, Charles Sheeler. These paintings also show a deep interest in the contradictions of flatness and perspective as represented on a canvas — ideas that, likewise, artists of the Middle Ages and early Renaissance pondered often. Overall, D'Arcangelo makes an effort at distilling his subject matter into its most honest, intelligible, and synoptic descriptions; his paintings are interpretations of the American experience, not just his own memories.

=== 1950s ===
Before D'Arcangelo returned to New York, his style was roughly figurative and reminiscent of folk art.

=== Early 1960s ===
During the early 1960s, Allan D'Arcangelo was linked with Pop Art. "Marilyn" (1962) depicts an illustrative head and shoulders on which the facial features are marked by lettered slits to be "fitted" with the eyebrows, eyes, nose and mouth which appear off to the right in the composition. In "Madonna and Child" (1963), the featureless faces of Jackie Kennedy and Caroline are ringed with haloes, enough to make their status as contemporary icons perfectly clear. Aside from film stars and icons from pop culture, D'Arcangelo also turned to political matters. His well known painting "Can Our National Bird Survive?" (1962) was painted the same year Rachel Carson published her seminal Silent Spring; its ambiguity also allows the viewer to interpret it as a statement about the Vietnam War.

=== Late 1960s ===
By the mid 1960s, D'Arcangelo had abandoned figurative elements and turned to the American landscape, or, more specifically, the highway. D'Arcangelo is better known for his pictures of highways and roadblocks, which pictured deep perspectival vistas in a simplified, flat plane, the view as seen from the driver's seat as one zooms along the seemingly never-ending American highway in most any state. He was initially interested in painting these scenes in a series, like a film strip, as the view changes outside your car window. In these paintings, the artist treats every single object with the same quality — both the same flatness and lack of extreme detail. This reads as detached; D'Arcangelo sought to investigate our separation from the natural world, which become more of a symbol than a description in these paintings. He was actually critiqued for these paintings as much as he was celebrated; Pop Art was considered a flat style, lacking perspectival plays of space. However, he argued that despite the receding lines of roads, the paintings ultimately were flat. In fact, these works are full of contrasts and contradictions: the flat surface has deep linear perspective; though there are recognizable motifs present, they are highly schematized; and abstract designs are mixed with recognizable objects, such as trees.

=== 1970s ===
Next came the series "Barriers", in which cropped, abstracted imagery of road barriers were superimposed over the one-point perspectival highway vistas. These were a move further towards concern with abstract, two-dimensionality without negating the element culled from seen aspects of the American landscape. The series called "Constellation" (there are 120 in all) further abstracted the view of road barriers into perspectival, jutting patterns thrusting across the canvas against a white ground. The element of the seen is never obliterated and always primary in D'Arcangelo's dialectic, as amply evidenced in his return to highway imagery in the 1970s. Though works from these two series appear abstract, D'Arcangelo still referred to them as landscapes because they generate the same sense of endless space and forces the space of the canvas to move between flatness and depth.

=== Late 1970s and early 1980s ===
For several years during this time, D'Arcangelo slowed down his formerly prolific output. He shed highway motifs completely and turned, instead, to cropped views of buildings and other structures, containers, and views outside of an airplane. In the spring of 1982 he had his first one-man exhibition in New York in five years. The new pictures were rather scenic landscape vistas, simplified and showing his ongoing concern with jutting perspectival space, now inhabited by flatly painted images of highway overpasses, a jet wing, grain field, electric lines. Indications of the American industrial scene seem more related to the hand-painted, pristine look of Charles Sheeler than to the pop of, say, Roy Lichtenstein. In form, there is also a reminiscence of field paintings in the simplicity and emblematic quality of these works. Now, as before, the main element in D'Arcangelo's pictures is the post-abstraction search for, as he put it, "icons that matter", monumental archetypes of the contemporary American expansive landscape highway.

== Exhibitions ==
=== Solo exhibitions ===
1958

- Allan D'Arcangelo: Oleos y Dibujos, Galeria Genova, Mexico City, August 1–19

1961

- Allan D'Arcangelo, Long Island University Galleries, Brooklyn, November 8–December 1

1963

- Fischbach Gallery, New York, April 30–May 25

1964

- Fischbach Gallery, New York, February 25–March 21

1965

- Ileana Sonnabend Gallery, Paris, January–February
- Fischbach Gallery, New York, May–June
- Gallery Müller, Stuttgart, Germany
- Hans Neuendorf Gallery, Hamburg, Germany

1966

- Dwan Gallery, Los Angeles, January 18–February 12

1967

- Fischbach Gallery, New York, February 14–March 4
- Galerie Ricke, Kassel, Germany, March 4–April 5
- Obelisk Gallery, Boston, November
- Minami Gallery, Tokyo, November 22–December 9
- Württembergischer Kunstverein, Stuttgart, Germany

1968

- Allan D'Arcangelo: Recent Paintings, Franklin Siden Gallery, Detroit, February 13–March 9
- Lambert Gallery, Paris

1969

- Allan D'Arcangelo, Gegenverkehr, Aachen, Germany, January 16–February 6
- Fischbach Gallery, New York, February 1–20
- Franklin Siden Gallery, Detroit

1970

- Obelisk Gallery, Boston, March
- Skylite Gallery, Wisconsin State University, Eauclaire, September 16–October 6

1971

- Allan D'Arcangelo, Paintings 1963–1970, Institute of Contemporary Art, University of Pennsylvania, Philadelphia, March 10–April 16; Albright-Knox Art Gallery, Buffalo, May 16–June 27; Museum of Contemporary Art, Chicago, July 10–September 5
- Allan D'Arcangelo: Recent Work, Marlborough Gallery, November 6–30

1972

- Allan D'Arcangelo: Recent Paintings and Works on Paper, Franklin Siden Gallery, Detroit, March 4–31
- Elvejen Art Center, University of Wisconsin, Madison

1974

- Schacht Fine Art Center, Russell Sage College, Troy, New York
- Patricia Moore Gallery, Aspen, Colorado
- Hokin Gallery, Chicago

1975

- Recent Paintings by Allan D'Arcangelo, Marlborough Gallery, New York, January 11–February 1
- Gallery Kingpitcher, Pittsburgh

1977

- Allan D'Arcangelo, Drawings and Graphics, Contemporary Art Forms, Encino, California, October 7–28
- Fiterman Gallery, Minneapolis

1978

- D'Arcangelo, Paintings of the Early Sixties, Neuberger Museum, State University of New York at Purchase, June 6–September 10

1979

- Allan D'Arcangelo, Institute of Contemporary Art of the Virginia Museum, Virginia Museum of Fine Arts, Richmond, May 8–July 1

1979–1980

- The American Landscape, Paintings by Allan D'Arcangelo, Burchfield Center, Buffalo, May 6–August 31, 1979; Fort Lauderdale Museum of Art, November 7–25, 1979; University Art Gallery, State University of New York at Albany, January 22–February 29, 1980; Wichita Art Museum, Kansas, March 30–May 11, 1980; Olean Public Library, New York, June 10–July 8, 1980

1982

- Allan D'Arcangelo: Paintings 1978–1982, Grace Borgenicht Gallery, New York, May 11–June 6

1984

- Recent Paintings, Elizabeth Galasso Gallery, Ossining, New York

1991

- Allan D'Arcangelo: Paintings, Jaffe Baker Gallery, Boca Raton, February–March

2000

- Allan D'Arcangelo: The Pop Years, Beth Urdang Gallery, November 11–December 6

2005

- Allan D'Arcangelo, Retrospettiva, Palazzina dei Giardini, Modena, January 23–March 28

2009

- Allan D'Arcangelo: Paintings 1962–1982, Mitchell Innes & Nash, New York, April 2–May 2

2014

- Beyond Pop: Allan D'Arcangelo, Hollis Taggart Galleries, New York, May 1–31

2017

- Allan D'Arcangelo: Without Sound, 1974–1982, Garth Greenan Gallery, New York, April 18–June 3

2018

- Allan D'Arcangelo: Pi in the Sky, Waddington Custot, London, UK, January 12–February 28

=== Group exhibitions ===
1958

- Annual Exhibition, Mexican American Institute, Mexico City

1963

- Landscape USA, Wilcox Gallery, Swarthmore College, Pennsylvania, February 9–March 5
- Pop Art USA, Oakland Art Museum, California; California College of Arts and Crafts, September 7–29
- The Popular Image, Institute of Contemporary Art, London, October 24–November 23
- Mixed Media and Pop Art, Albright-Knox Art Gallery, Buffalo, November 19–December 15
- Three Centuries of Popular Imagery, Des Moines Art Center, Iowa; Addison Gallery, Phillips Academy, Andover, Massachusetts
- The Hard Center, Thibaut Gallery, New York
- New Realism, University of Massachusetts, Amherst, Massachusetts
- Popular Imagery, Sarah Lawrence College, New York

1963–1964

- An American Viewpoint, Contemporary Art Center, Cincinnati, Ohio, December, 1963–January 7, 1964
- Toys by Artists, Betty Parsons Gallery, New York, December 17, 1963 – January 4, 1964

1964

- Sight and Sound, Cordier Ekstrom Gallery, New York, January 3–25
- Nieuwe Realisten, Haags Gemeente Museum, The Hague, Netherlands, June 24–August 30; Akademie der Kunst, Berlin, Germany
- Pop, Etc., Museum des 20 Jahrhunderts, Vienna, Austria, September 19–October 31
- West Side Artists: New York City, Riverside Museum, New York, September 27–November 8
- Landscapes, Bryon Gallery, New York
- American Landscape Painting, Museum of Modern Art, New York; Spoleto Festival, Italy
- Boxes, Dwan Gallery, Los Angeles
- Anti-Sensitivity Art, Ohio University, Athens
- Salon du Mai, Paris

1965

- The Arena of Love, Dwan Gallery, Los Angeles, January 5–February 1
- Pop Art, Nouveau Realisme, Etc. ... , Palais des Beaux-Arts, Brussels, February 5–March 1
- The New American Realism, Worcester Art Museum, Massachusetts, February 18–April 4
- Allan D'Arcangelo: Bilder und John Chamberlain: Plastiken, Galerie Rudolf Zwirner, March
- Pop Art and the American Tradition, Milwaukee Arts Center, Wisconsin, April 9–May 9
- Northeastern Regional Exhibition of Art Across America, Institute of Contemporary Art, Boston, May 1–June 6
- Self-Portraits, School of Visual Arts, New York
- Pop Art Aus USA, Galerie Neuendorf, Hamburg, Germany
- New Acquisitions, Larry Aldrich Museum, Ridgefield, Connecticut
- Figuration in Contemporary Art, Greuze Gallery, Paris
- Aspen Institute of Humanistic Studies, Colorado
- Love and Kisses, Dwan Gallery, Los Angeles

1965–1966

- Arakawa, Allan D'Arcangelo, Mark di Suvero, Robert Grosvenor, Anthony Magar, Neil Williams, Dwan Gallery, Los Angeles, December 21, 1965 – January 15, 1966

1965–1967

- Pop and Op, Virginia Museum of Fine Arts, Richmond, 1965; American Federation of Arts Gallery, New York, 1966; Commercial Museum, Philadelphia Civic Center, Philadelphia, 1966; Baltimore Museum of Art, Baltimore, 1966; Everson Museum of Art, Syracuse, New York, 1966; Flint Institute of Arts, Michigan, 1966; William Rockhill Nelson Gallery of Art, Kansas City, Missouri, 1966; Isaac Delgado Museum of Art, New Orleans, 1966; Columbus Museum of Arts and Crafts, Columbus, Georgia, 1966; High Museum of Art, Atlanta, 1966; Cincinnati Art Museum, Ohio, 1966; California Palace of the Legion of Honor, San Francisco, 1967; Portland Art Museum, Oregon, 1967; Municipal Art Gallery, Los Angeles, 1967; Oklahoma Art Center, Oklahoma City, 1967; Munson-Williams-Proctor Institute, Utica, New York, 1967

1966

- Contemporary Art USA, Norfolk Museum of Arts and Sciences, Virginia, March 18–April 10
- Conditional Commitment: The Artist's Terms, Upsala College, East Orange, New Jersey, March 25–April 10
- Games Without Rules, Fischbach Gallery, New York, March 29–April 16
- Critic's Choice, Long Beach Museum of Art, California, April 3–May 1
- 11 Pop Artists: The New Image, Galerie Friedrich-Dahlem, Munich, Germany; Galerie Neuendorf, Hamburg, Germany, April 24–May 31
- The Harry M. Abrams Collection, Jewish Museum, New York, June 29–September 5
- Sculpture and Painting Today: Selections from the Collection of Susan Hilles, Museum of Fine Arts, Boston, October 7–November 6
- A National Small Painting Show, University of Omaha, November 7–30
- American Pop Artists, Galleria La Bertesca, Genova, Italy, November 12–December 10
- Group Show, Pratt Center for Contemporary Printmaking, New York
- Current Trends in American Art, Westmoreland County Museum of Art, Greensburg, Virginia
- Graphics International, Phoenix Gallery, New York
- Prints, AFA Gallery, New York
- Landscapes, School of Visual Arts, New York
- Writer's Conference, Long Island University, Brooklyn

1966–1967

- The John G. Powers Collection, Larry Aldrich Museum, Ridgefield, Connecticut, September 25, 1966 – January 15, 1967
- The Watershed: Two Decades of American Painting, National Museum of Modern Art, Tokyo, October 15–November 27, 1966; Kyoto, December 10, 1966–January 22, 1967; National Gallery of Victoria, *Australia, 1967; Art Gallery of New South Wales, Australia, 1967; Lalit Kala Akademi, New Delhi, India, April 1967
- 5th International Biennial of Prints, National Museum, Tokyo, December 4, 1966 – January 22, 1967
- New Forms, Stedelijk Museum, Amsterdam; Württembergischer Kunstverein, Stuttgart, Germany, 1966–1967; Kunsthalle, Bern, Switzerland, 1967

1966–1970

- Americans Today, 25 Painters as Printmakers, Museum of Modern Art, New York, November 1–9; Abidjan, Ivory Coast, Africa, 1970

1967

- Paintings: Studio 11, Württembergischer Kunstverein, Stuttgart, Germany, January 17–February 5
- Formen der Farbe, Stedelijk Museum, Amsterdam, February 17–March 26
- Original Pop Art, Städtische Kunstausstellung, Gelsenkirchen, Germany, March 5–May 20
- American Painting Now, Expo 67, American Pavilion, Montreal, Canada, April–October
- Form, Color, Image, Detroit Institute of Arts, Michigan, April 11–May 21
- Premio Internacional, Instituto Torcuato di Tella, Buenos Aires, Argentina, September–October
- Transatlantic Graphics, Laing Art Gallery, Newcastle upon Tyne, September 30–October 21
- The 180 Beacon Collection of Contemporary Art, 180 Beacon Street, Boston, October
- Art on Paper, Weatherspoon Museum, Greensboro, North Carolina, October 15–November 22
- Protest and Hope, New School Art Center, New York, October 24–December 2
- Prints, Society of American Graphic Artists, New York
- Environment USA: 1957–1967, IX Bienal de São Paulo, Brazil
- Group Show, Vanderlip Gallery, Philadelphia
- Highlights of the 1966–1967 Art Season, Larry Aldrich Museum, Ridgefield, Connecticut
- American Painting Now, ACA Gallery, Boston
- Contemporary Drawings, New York University
- Director's Choice, Walker Art Center, Minneapolis, Minnesota
- Pop Art Americana: D'Arcangelo, Dine, Kelly, Lichtenstein, Oldenburg, Phillips, Ramos, Rosenquist, Segal, Warhol, Wesley, Wesselman, Galleria De' Foscherari, Bologna, Italy

1967–1968

- Frank O'Hara / In Memory of My Feelings, Museum of Modern Art, New York, December 5, 1967 – January 28, 1968
- Annual Exhibition of Contemporary American Painting, Whitney Museum of American Art, New York, December 13, 1967 – February 4, 1968
- American Painting Now, Horticultural Hall, Boston, December 15, 1967 – January 10, 1968

1968

- American Paintings on the Market Today, Cincinnati Art Museum, Ohio, April 9–May 12
- L'Art Vivant 1965–1968, Fondation Maeght à St. Paul de Vence, France, April 13–June 30
- Five Museums Come to Fordham University, Fordham University, New York, April 28–May 19
- Social Comment in America, Museum of Modern Art, New York; Museum of Art, Bowdoin College, Brunswick, Maine, June 13–July 7
- Beyond Literalism: An Exhibition of Painting and Sculpture by Allan D'Arcangelo, Charles Fahlen, Jack Krueger, Naoto Nakagawa, Frank Roth, William Schwedler, William Wiley, Moore College of Art, *Philadelphia, October 4–November 2
- Environment U.S.A.: 1957–1967, Rose Art Museum, Waltham, Massachusetts
- 1 Print, 1 Painting, School of Visual Art, New York
- Exposicion International de Dibujo, Universidad de Puerto Rico, Mayaguez
- Recent Directions in American Art, University of California at Riverside
- Last Ten Years of Contemporary Art, Fordham University, New York

1968–1969

- Querschnitt, Galerie Rickie, Lindenstraße, Germany, November 27, 1968 – January 7, 1969

1969

- Toledo Collectors of Modern Art, Toledo Museum of Art, Ohio, March 9–April 6
- American Sculpture of the Sixties, Grand Rapids Art Museum, Michigan, March 22–May 24
- Superlimited: Boxes, Books and Things, Jewish Theological Seminary of America, Jewish Museum, New York, April 16–June 29
- New Acquisitions, Whitney Museum of American Art, New York, May 15–June 22
- Contemporary Art – Acquisitions, 1966–1969, Albright-Knox Art Gallery, Buffalo, June 17–September 1
- Painting for City Walls, Museum of Modern Art, New York, July 14–November 5
- Ikonen der Verkehrskuitur, Kunstzentrum Gegenverkegr, Aachen, Germany
- Critic's Choice 1968–69, New York State Council on the Arts and the State University of New York

1969–1970

- American Drawings of the Sixties, A Selection, New School Art Center, New York, November 11, 1969 – January 10, 1970

1970

- The Highway, University of Pennsylvania, Institute of Contemporary Art, Philadelphia, January 14–February 25; Houston Texas Institute for the Arts, Rice University, March 12–May 18; Akron Art Institute, Ohio, June 5–July 26
- American Prints Today, Munson-Williams-Proctor Institute, Utica, New York, January 18–February 22
- Painting and Sculpture Today, Indianapolis Museum of Art, Indiana, April 21–June 1
- Using Walls (Indoors), Jewish Theological Seminary of America, Jewish Museum, New York, May 13–June 21
- Pop Art, Galerie de Gestlo, Hamburg, Germany, June 25–August 22
- Internationale der Zeichnung, Zeitgenossische Kunst, Darmstadt, Germany, August 15–November 11
- IV Bienal Americana de Grabado, Museo National de Bellas Artes, Santiago, Chile
- Kunst der Sechziger Jahre, Wallraf-Richartz Museum, Cologne, Germany
- XI Bienal De Arte Coltejer de Medellin, Colombia, South America
- Exhibition of Paintings Eligible for the Childe Hassam Fund Purchase, American Academy of Arts and Letters, New York
- American Painting: the 1960s, American Federation of Arts, New York

1971

- 20th-Century Painting & Sculpture from the New York University Art Collection, Hudson River Museum, Yonkers, New York, October 2–November 14
- Collage of Indignation, Hundred Acres/Lower Gallery, New York, October 13–November 6
- Inner Spaces/Outer Limits: Myths and Mythmakers, Lerner-Misrachi Gallery, New York, November 25–December 25

1971–1972

- The Artist and the American Landscape, AM Sachs Gallery, New York, November 30, 1971 – January 5, 1972

1972

- Art in Process, Finch College Museum of Art, New York, February
- Painting and Sculpture Today 1972, Indianapolis Museum of Art, April 26–June 4
- Bienal Americana des Artes Graficas, La Terulia Museum, Cali, Colombia
- Group Show, Elvehjem Art Museum, Madison, Wisconsin

1973

- Exhibition of Paintings Eligible for Childe Hassam Fund Purchase, American Academy of Arts and Letters, New York, November 9–December 16
- Contemporary Artists: Early and Late Paintings, Hamilton College, Root Art Center, Clinton, New York
- List Art Posters, New School Art Center, New York
- Group Show, National Academy of Design, New York

1973–1974

- Hommage à Picasso, Kestner-Gessellschaft, Hannover, Germany, November 23, 1973 – January 13, 1974

1974

- American Pop Art, Whitney Museum of American Art, New York, April 6–June 16
- Contemporary American Painting from the Lewis Collection, Delaware Art Museum, Wilmington, Delaware, September 13–October 27
- II Bienal Americana de Artes Graficas, Museo La Tertulia, Cali, Colombia

1974–1975

- Inaugural Exhibition, Hirshhorn Museum, Washington, D.C., October 4, 1974 – September 15, 1975

1975

- Six Corporate Collectors: Western New York's New Art Patrons, Burchfield Center, Buffalo
- Group Show, Dorsky Gallery, New York
- Group Show, Marlborough-Goddard Gallery, Toronto

1975–1976

- Images of an Era: The American Poster 1945–75, Corcoran Gallery of Art, Washington, D.C., November 21, 1975 – January 4, 1976; Contemporary Art Museum, Houston, February 2–March 19, 1976; Museum of Science and Industry, Chicago, April 1–May 2, 1976; Grey Art Gallery and Study Center, New York, May 22–June 31, 1976

1975–1977

- American Art since 1945: from the Collection of the Museum of Modern Art, Worcester Art Museum, Massachusetts, October 22–November 30, 1975; Toledo Museum of Art, Ohio, January 11–February 22, 1976; Denver Art Museum, Colorado, March 22–May 2, 1976; Fine Arts Gallery of San Diego, May 31–July 11, 1976; Dallas Museum of Fine Arts, August 19–October 3, 1976; Joslyn Art Museum, Omaha, Nebraska, October 25–December 5, 1976; Greenville County Museum, South Carolina, January 10–February 20, 1977; Virginia Museum of Fine Arts, Richmond, March 14–April 17, 1977

1976

- Urban Aesthetics, Queens Museum, New York, January 17–February 29
- The 54th Exhibition of the Society of American Graphic Artists, Pratt Institute Graphics Center, New York, March 11–April 7
- Prints and Techniques: Selections from the New York University Collection, Grey Art Gallery and Study Center, New York University, April 1–May 5
- Works by Living American Artists: Western New York, Burchfield Center, Buffalo, May 9–June 27
- Artists Celebrate the Bicentennial, National Museum Art Gallery, Singapore, May 25–June 11
- Bicentennial Banner Show, Hirshhorn Museum, Washington, D.C.
- III Bienal Americana de Artes Graficas, La Tertulia Museum, Cali, Colombia, October
- Exhibition of Paintings and Related Drawings, Charles Burchfield Center, Buffalo
- New York 1976, Riksutallingar Museum, Stockholm, Sweden
- Artists with Skowhegan, Boston Museum of Fine Art
- Benefit Exhibit for Artists' Rights, Genesis Gallery, New York
- Project Rebuild, Grey Art Gallery, New York University

1976–77

- In Praise of Space – The Landscape in American Art, Corcoran Gallery of Art, Washington, D.C.

1977

- Photonotations II, Rosa Esman Gallery, New York, May 3–June 4
- Brooklyn College Art Department: Past and Present, 1942–1977, Davis & Long Company, New York, and Robert Schoelkopf Gallery, New York, September 13–October 8
- Recent Gifts and Purchases, Guggenheim Museum of Art, New York, September 16–October 16
- Invitational American Drawing Exhibition, Fine Arts Gallery, San Diego, September 17–October 30
- Fotos Aus Der Kunstszene New York, Kunstmuseum Düsseldorf, September 23–October 16
- Artists Salute Skowhegan, Kennedy Gallery, New York, December 8–21
- Contemporary American Art, Minneapolis Institute of Art, Minnesota
- Arts for the Arts, Museum of Contemporary Crafts, New York

1977–1978

- Inaugural Exhibition, Wichita Art Museum, Kansas, October 23, 1977 – January 15, 1978
- Private Images: Photographs by Painters, Los Angeles County Museum, California, December 20, 1977 – March 5, 1978

1977–1979

- 55th National Traveling Print Exhibition, Society of American Graphic Artists, New York, October 1977–December 1979

1978

- Art and the Automobile, Flint Institute of Arts, Michigan, January 12–March 12
- Another Aspect of Pop Art, P.S. 1, Institute for Art and Urban Resources, Long Island City, New York, October 1–November 19
- Small Scale Work, Ehrlich Gallery, New York

1979

- Twenty-Fourth Annual Contemporary Painting Exhibition, Lehigh University, Bethlehem, Pennsylvania
- Art Package, Highland Park, Illinois

1980

- Printed Art: A View of Two Decades, Museum of Modern Art, New York, February 13–April 1
- Contemporary Artists of Western New York, Permanent Collection Including New Acquisitions, Charles Burchfield Center, Buffalo, February 24–September 7
- Annuals and Perennials: Latest Acquisitions and Others from the Permanent Collection, Charles Burchfield Center, Buffalo, June 22–September 28

1981

- Annuals and Perennials II: Latest Acquisitions and Others from the Permanent Collection, Charles Burchfield Center, Buffalo, May 10–September 20
- Cities and Villages: Drawings and Paintings by Western New York Artists, September 27–November 15

1982

- Annuals and Perennials: New Acquisitions and Other Selections from the Permanent Collection, Charles Burchfield Center, June 27–September 26

1983

- Spotlighting the Collection, Burchfield Art Center, March 27–May 11

1984

- Autoscape: The Automobile in the American Landscape, Whitney Museum of American Art, Fairfield County, Connecticut, March 30–May 30
- 33 Western New York Artists: Works from the Permanent Collection, Burchfield Art Center, Buffalo, July 22–September 23
- Buffalo's Waterfront: A Tribute to James Carey Evans III, Burchfield Art Center, Buffalo, November 4–December 2
- Night Lights, Dart Gallery, Chicago, November 16–December 11

1984–1985

- Automobile and Culture, Museum of Contemporary Art, Los Angeles, July 21, 1984 – January 6, 1985

1985

- Detroit Style, Automotive Form, 1925–1950, Detroit Institute of Arts, Michigan, June 12–September 8
- A Toast to the N.E.A.: Works by Western New York Artists, Charles Burchfield Art Center, Buffalo

1985–1986

- Inaugural Exhibition for the Frances and Sydney Lewis Wing, Virginia Museum of Fine Arts, Richmond, December 4, 1985 – January 26, 1986

1986

- Art from the City University of New York: Approaches to Abstraction, Shanghai Exhibition Hall, China, November

1986–1987

- Pop Art and Image: The Artists' Choice, Art Train Exhibition (nationwide tour)

1987

- Made in the USA: Art from the 50s and 60s, University Art Museum, Berkeley, California, April 4–June 21; Nelson-Atkins Museum of Art, Kansas City, July 25–September 6; Virginia Museum of Fine Arts, Richmond, October 7–December 7
- American Pop Art, Dorsky Gallery, New York, May 5–June 6
- The Artful Traveller, B.M.W. Gallery, New York, July–October 31
- Pop Art USA-UK: American and British Artists of the 60s and 80s, Odakyu Grand Gallery, Tokyo, July 24–August 18, 1987; Dalmaru Museum, Osaka; Funabashi Selbu Museum of Art, Funabashi; Sogo Museum of Art, Yokohama
- Dallas Pop Art Americana alla Nuova Figurazione, Padiglione d'Arte Contemporanea, Milan, September 23–November 23

1988–1989

- Drive!, B.M.W. Gallery, New York, October 1988–March 1989

1990

- Pop on Paper, James Goodman Gallery, New York, May 4–June 15

1991

- Pop Art, Royal Academy of Arts, London, September 13, 1991 – December 15, 1991

1994–1995

- The Prints of Roy Lichtenstein, National Gallery of Art, Washington, D.C., October 30, 1994 – January 8, 1995; Los Angeles County Museum of Art, February 16–April 30, 1995; Dallas Museum of Art, May 28–August 6, 1995

1997

- The Great American Pop Art Store: Multiples of the Sixties, University Art Museum, California State University, Long Beach, August 26–October 26
- The Pop '60s: Transatlantic Crossing, Centro Cultural de Belém, Lisbon, September 11–November 17

1997–2002

- Buffalo's Grain Elevators, Burchfield Penney Art Center, Buffalo, April 19–June 1; Kenan Center, Lockport, New York, September 10–October 8; Western New York Public Broadcasting Association, Horizons Plaza, Buffalo, December 10, 2001 – February 1, 2002

1998

- Masters of the Masters: MFA Faculty of the School of Visual Arts New York 1983–1998, Butler Institute of American Art, Youngstown, Ohio, April 4–May 17

1998–1999

- Pop Art: Selection from the Museum of Modern Art, High Museum of Art, Atlanta, October 24, 1998 – January 17, 1999

1999

- Pop Impressions Europe/USA: Print and Multiples from the Museum of Modern Art, Museum of Modern Art, New York, February 18–May 18
- Sites/Sights of Passage: Art of the New Jersey Turnpike, James Howe Fine Arts Gallery, Kean University, October 4–November 5

2001

- Pop Art: U.S./U.K. Connections, 1956/1966, The Menil Collection, Houston, January 26–May 23

2004

- Pop Classics, ARoS Aarhus Kunstmuseum, Denmark, May 28–September 5

2007

- Pop Art at Princeton: Permanent and Promised, Princeton University Art Museum, New Jersey, March 24–August 12

2012–2013

- Sinister Pop, Whitney Museum of American Art, New York, November 15, 2012 – March 31, 2013

2012–2016

- Pop Art Design, Vitra Design Museum, Weil am Rhein, Germany, October 13, 2012 – March 3, 2013; Louisiana Museum of Modern Art, Humlebaek, Denmark, February 21–June 9, 2013; Moderna Museet, Stockholm, Sweden, June 27–September 9, 2013; Barbican Art Gallery, London, October 18, 2013 – February 9, 2014; Emma Espoo, Finland, February 17–May 10, 2015; Henie-Ostad Kunstenter, Hovikodden, Norway, May 28–August 30, 2015; Museum of Contemporary Art, Chicago, December 19, 2015 – March 27, 2016

2014

- Bridging the Great Divide: Landscape From Tradition to New Media, Burchfield Penney Art Center, February 14–June 1

2015

- America Is Hard to See, Whitney Museum of American Art, New York, May 1–September 27

2016–2017

- From the Collection: 1960–1969, Museum of Modern Art, New York, March 26, 2016 – March 12, 2017
- Human Interest: Portraits from the Whitney's Collection, Whitney Museum of American Art, New York, April 6, 2016 – February 12, 2017

2017

- Pop 'n' Op, Asheville Art Museum, North Carolina, March 18–May 14

== Collections ==
D'Arcangelo's work is found in the permanent collections of major museums and other public institutions worldwide.

- Albright-Knox Art Gallery, Buffalo
- Allentown Art Museum, Pennsylvania
- Anderson Gallery, University of Buffalo, New York
- Art Institute of Chicago
- Asheville Art Museum, North Carolina
- Boca Raton Museum of Art, Florida
- Brooklyn Museum
- Burchfield-Penney Art Center, Buffalo, New York
- Butler Institute of American Art, Youngstown, Ohio
- Canton Museum of Art, Ohio
- Casa Cavazzini, Museum of Modern Art, Udine, Italy
- Centre Pompidou, Paris
- Chazen Museum of Art, University of Wisconsin-Madison
- Cleveland Museum of Art, Cleveland, Ohio
- Contemporary Art Museum, Skopje, North Macedonia
- Currier Museum of Art, New Hampshire
- Dallas Museum of Art
- Denver Art Museum
- Detroit Institute of Arts
- De Young Museum, San Francisco
- Fine Arts Collection, Luther College, Decorah, Iowa
- Fisogni Museum, Tradate, Italy
- Fogg Museum, Harvard University, Cambridge, Massachusetts
- Fred Jones Jr. Museum of Art, University of Oklahoma, Norman
- Gemeentemuseum Den Haag, The Hague, Netherlands
- Georgia Museum of Art, University of Georgia, Athens
- Godwin-Ternbach Museum, Queens College, City University of New York
- Governor Nelson A. Rockefeller Empire State Plaza Art Collection, Albany, New York
- Grey Art Gallery, New York University
- Hirshhorn Museum and Sculpture Garden, Washington, D.C.
- Indianapolis Museum of Art, Indiana
- Kunstmuseum Gelsenkirchen, Gelsenkirchen-Buer, Germany
- Massachusetts Institute of Technology, Cambridge, Massachusetts
- Metropolitan Museum of Art, New York
- Minneapolis Institute of Art
- Museum Ludwig, Cologne
- Museum of Art and Archaeology, University of Missouri, Columbia
- Museum of Modern Art, New York
- National Gallery of Art, Washington, D.C.
- National Gallery of Australia, Canberra
- National Gallery of Victoria, Melbourne, Australia
- New Jersey State Museum, Trenton
- New Orleans Museum of Art
- Niigata Prefectural Museum of Modern Art, Nagaoka, Japan
- North Carolina Museum of Art, Raleigh, North Carolina
- Pensacola Museum of Art, University of West Florida
- Pomona College Museum of Art, Claremont, California
- Rose Art Museum, Brandeis University, Waltham, Massachusetts
- Royal Museums of Fine Arts of Belgium, Brussels
- Smithsonian American Art Museum, Washington, D.C.
- Solomon R. Guggenheim Museum, New York City
- Tate Modern, London
- Virginia Museum of Fine Arts, Richmond
- Wadsworth Atheneum, Hartford, Connecticut
- Walker Art Center, Minneapolis
- Weatherspoon Art Museum, Greensboro, North Carolina
- Weisman Art Museum, University of Minnesota, Minneapolis
- Whitney Museum of American Art, New York City
- Wichita Art Museum, Kansas

== See also ==
- Abstract Illusionism
- Pop Art
- Hard-edge painting
