= Zanis Waldheims =

Latvian painter (1909-1993)

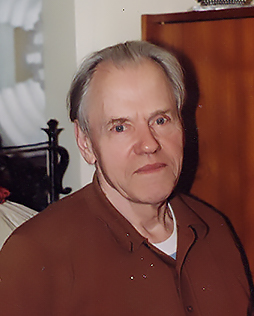
- Waldheims in 1987
- Born: Žanis Valdheima; 19 September 1909; Jaunpils, Zemgale, Latvia
- Died: 19 July 1993 (aged 83); Montreal, Canada
- Known for: graphic artist
- Movement: Geometric abstract art

Zanis Waldheims (Latvian: Žanis Valdheims; 19 September 1909 – 19 July 1993) was a Latvian geometric abstractionist artist who produced contemporary art from the 1950s until his death in 1993.

He adopted an art-based research practice to develop a visual language of geometric abstraction that acts as a map to orient thinking and understanding towards solutions that lead to peace and security. In addition to having a collection of over 650 pieces of art, he also kept extensive personal journals, sketchbooks, and hundreds of handwritten notes and figures that served as documentation for his ideas.

== Biography ==
Zanis Waldheims lived his early years in Latvia and experienced World War I and the subsequent declaration of independence from communist Russia in 1918. He married Irene Migla in 1938 and they had two children. He completed his studies in law at the Riga University in 1941 but never practiced because of the Russian and German occupations of Latvia. By the end of 1945, they lived in the United Nations Relief and Rehabilitation Administration (UNRAA) refugee camps in Bamberg, Germany. They separated in 1947. His wife and children moved to Michigan State in the United States, while he moved to France for the next five years.

He emigrated to Canada in February 1952 and settled in Montreal where he worked as a labourer in a goods and materials distribution warehouse. He was joined one year later by Bernadette Pekss, a Latvian compatriot he met in Paris and with whom he lived until his death. In 1961, he was laid off and dedicated the next ten years to the development of his ideas on geometrization. He returned to work in 1971 and continued to expand his ideas on geometrization and his art until his death.

== Artistic development ==
=== Motivation ===
Waldheims was motivated by the political impact of the conclusion of World War II. He revolted against the leading political leaders who negotiated the post-war agreements which left his country Latvia and the Baltic states under the occupation rule of the communist Soviet Union. By the late 1950s, his path led him to imagine and develop a visual language to address societal and political issues. His goal was to overcome the manipulation of words and ideologies through propaganda. This resulted in the development of a ‘map for human orientation' inspired by French philosopher and psychologist Maine de Biran.

=== Early geometrization (1952-1960) ===
He undertook a self-directed research program in history, philosophy, psychology, physics, geometry, and mathematics. His earliest sketches are dated back to 1956 where they supplement his notes and interpretations of his readings. These became more complex and layered to construct the framework of a schema for thinking. He used technical drawing techniques and tools to enhance the regularity and intention in his schema. He found that a geometric framework provided a unifying intellectual structure upon which he could map a systematic approach to conflict resolution. He categorised relevant ideas with a set of geometric symbols. He later added colors with ink and eventually began to draw more complex and larger drawings with colored pencils. Beginning in 1963, he drew larger (600 mm x 600 mm) colorful geometric artwork for which he has become known.

=== Thesis (1960-1970) ===
During this period, he applied himself full time to his research, the development of the schema being the superposition of layers of meanings. By 1963, he had a set of 214 black and white figures and an essay outlining his motives and geometrization. On October 15, 1970, the Office of Copyright in Ottawa registered (register number 132769) as an unpublished literary work La géométrisation de la pensée exhaustive (The Geometrization of Exhaustive Thought) in which he explains his ideas and theory along with a series of 314 figures to which many of the first 230 colored works of art can be associated.

=== Sculptural phase (1971-1985) ===
The next phase of his artistic development involves the exploration in three dimensions or his artwork through the construction of cubic Styrofoam sculptures. This extended the abstraction of thought from the unidimensional linear structure of sentences, to the two dimensions of a drawing to the three dimensions of a sculpture. He relied more on work from his sketchbooks to develop series that expand on a theme. He correlated the base of the 3D structures with darker shades and progressed to the higher elevations with lighter and brighter colors.

=== University years (1985-1988) ===
In 1985, at the age of 76, he enrolled in the Bachelors of Philosophy program at the Université du Québec à Montréal (UQAM). He used this period to challenge and validate in an academic setting his own ideas with those of the philosophers he studied . He also used this period also to challenge the teachers with his method of geometrization. Some teachers were receptive to his approach, while others did not as they did not see the rapport between ideas and their geometrical abstractions. He obtained his bachelor's degree in 1988. It is also at this time that he stopped drawing.

=== Final years (1989-1993) ===
His last years were dedicated to reviewing his early ideas and essays into a final version of his Philosophie plastique. This 500-page document was never published.

He died age 83 in Montreal on July 19, 1993.

== Geometrization of the exhaustive thought ==
=== Philosophical perspectives ===
Geometrization here is not only a technique to construct representative figures, reduced forms of concrete or abstract objects, but it is also an art in quest of harmony between what is beautiful and true in knowledge and of the balance between personal good and universal justice. Waldheims sees the necessity of merging of aesthetics and science into a holistic way of expression and address sociological and human issues with geometric abstraction.

Waldheims developed his approach of the exhaustive thought from many sources. He explored the domains of phenomenology of Kant, Heidegger, Cassirer and Husserl. He counterbalanced these ideas with scientific and mathematical ideasfrom de Broglie, Descartes, Heisenberg, and Poincaré. He constructed his framework on the principles space-time formulated by Hermann Weyl and present in the Minkowski Space. He also included elements of logic from Bertrand Russell and Stephane Lupasco. He adapted Hegel's dialectic principle to develop the unité de sens (unit of meaning) that conjugates two opposing or complementary points of view along with a third central element of consensus as part of the solution to existential and societal issues. He also explored the domain of psychology of Jung, Freud, Weizacker, and Adler. He also included artistic perspectives from Goethe, Ostwald, Albers, Klee, Kandinsky and Vasarely.

Waldheims was inspired to geometrize the human psyche from his readings of Maine de Biran and Max Scheler who both proposed that the human psyche can be imagined as a pyramidal structure. He also integrated Jean Piaget's epistemology of intellectual development. The ideas of his 1970 thesis explore the multiple facets of this pyramid of the consciousness or Noosphere inspired from Pierre Theilard de Chardin and Rudolph Arnheim. With these foundations he produced hundreds of drawings and constructed a three-dimensional model, the Schéma de l'entendement (Schema of understanding) that synthesizes the many years of research into his process of geometrizing thought.

The artistic philosophy that underlies this schema seeks to overcome the challenges of social polarization resulting from the ideological discourse of authoritarians and anarchists. It relies on the application of the schema to find the convergence of commonalities between opposing or complementary position. Applying the principles of geometrization will orient individuals in an exhaustive thought process that supersedes the simplicity of binary options of being for or against an idea and rally around what binds "myself" and "the other" into the "us".

=== Principles of geometrization ===
Geometrization utilizes a set of five basic shapes (square, circle, diamond, star and cartesian axes) and their combinations to categorise words and simplify complex ideas. Each basic shape represents a degree of abstraction of a phenomenon or an idea along a spectrum between the concrete perception of the image (extensive) and the abstract possibilities that can be imagined (intensive). These shapes are added as exponents above words to categorize them. They are also found in the margins of the books he read to geometrize key ideas and construct his schematic system of exhaustive thinking. The next step in the design consists of schematic line drawings that subdivides the space according to a set of anchoring points shared by all the basic shapes and their combinations. Colors are then added to differentiate significant areas on the drawings. The shading of colors from dark to light enhances the impression of movement and depth leading to the construction of three-dimensional structures. This sculptural aspect of his art encourages the development of thought as a progression through four structural orders that are progressively more complex and comprehensive. They move through the point, line, surface and volume where the architectural aspects coordinate and subordinate the thought processes just as the philosophy hopes to create harmony between the individual and other members of society.

== Exhibitions ==
=== Exhibitions ===
- 1976 – Lachine Public Library. Montreal, Canada. (February 16 – 28, 1976).
- 1981 – La Pommeraie Elementary School. Mont Saint-Hilaire, Canada (November 13–15, 1981).
- 1982 – Brébeuf College. Montreal, Canada. (September 20–25, 1982).
- 1992 - L'art populaire urbain. Musée de la Ville de Lachine. Montreal, Canada. (July 25 - September 20, and November 1992)

=== Posthumous exhibitions ===
- 2006 - Presentation of the Noosphere. Frank Lloyd Wright School of Architecture. Scottsdale, Arizona.
- 2016 - Survival Kit 8 - Acupuncture of Society. Latvian Center for Contemporary Art, Riga, Latvia. (September 8–25, 2016)
- 2018 - Portable Landscapes, Latvian National Museum of Art, Riga, Latvia. (April 27 - June 17, 2018)
- 2020 - Riga Notebook - Following the Lines of Wacław Spakowsky, Muzeum Sztuki, Łódź, Poland. (October 23, 2020 - February 28, 2021)
- 2020 - The Exhaustive Thought. October 28 - November 21, 2020. Art Museum, Toronto, Canada (October 28 - November 21, 2020). Curated by Xenia Benivolski.

=== Academic presentations and publications ===
- Jeanson, Yves. 2006. Presentation of the Noosphere. Frank Lloyd Wright School of Architecture. Scottsdale, Arizona.
- Jeanson, Yves. 2008. Geometry as an Abstraction. Proceedings. 20th Biennial Congress of International Association of Empirical Aeshtetics (IAEA) Chicago, United States. pp. 155–156
- Jeanson, Yves. 2010. Zanis Waldheims' Creative Process. Abstract. 21st Biennial Congress of International Association of Empirical Aesthetics (IAEA) Dresden, Germany.
- Jeanson, Yves. 2012. Zanis Waldheims' Abstract and Geometric Art. Proceedings 15th International Conference on Geometry and Graphics (ICGG), Montreal, Canada.
- Jeanson, Yves. 2013. Zanis Waldheims: Giving meaning to abstract art - a non-conformist approach or the Pathway to self-reliance. Scientific Proceedings of the 12 th International Conference on Engineering Graphics BALTGRAF. Riga, Latvia.
- Guy, Raymond. 2020. Zanis Waldheims : une interprétation géométrique de la société. M@GM@ Revue internationale des humanités et de sciences sociales v.18 n.02. ISSN 1721-9809
- Guy, Raymond. 2021. Une pensée exhasutive dans un monde binaire. M@GM@ Revue internationale des humanités et de sciences sociales v.19 n.03. ISSN 1721-9809
