= Peter Hugo McClure =

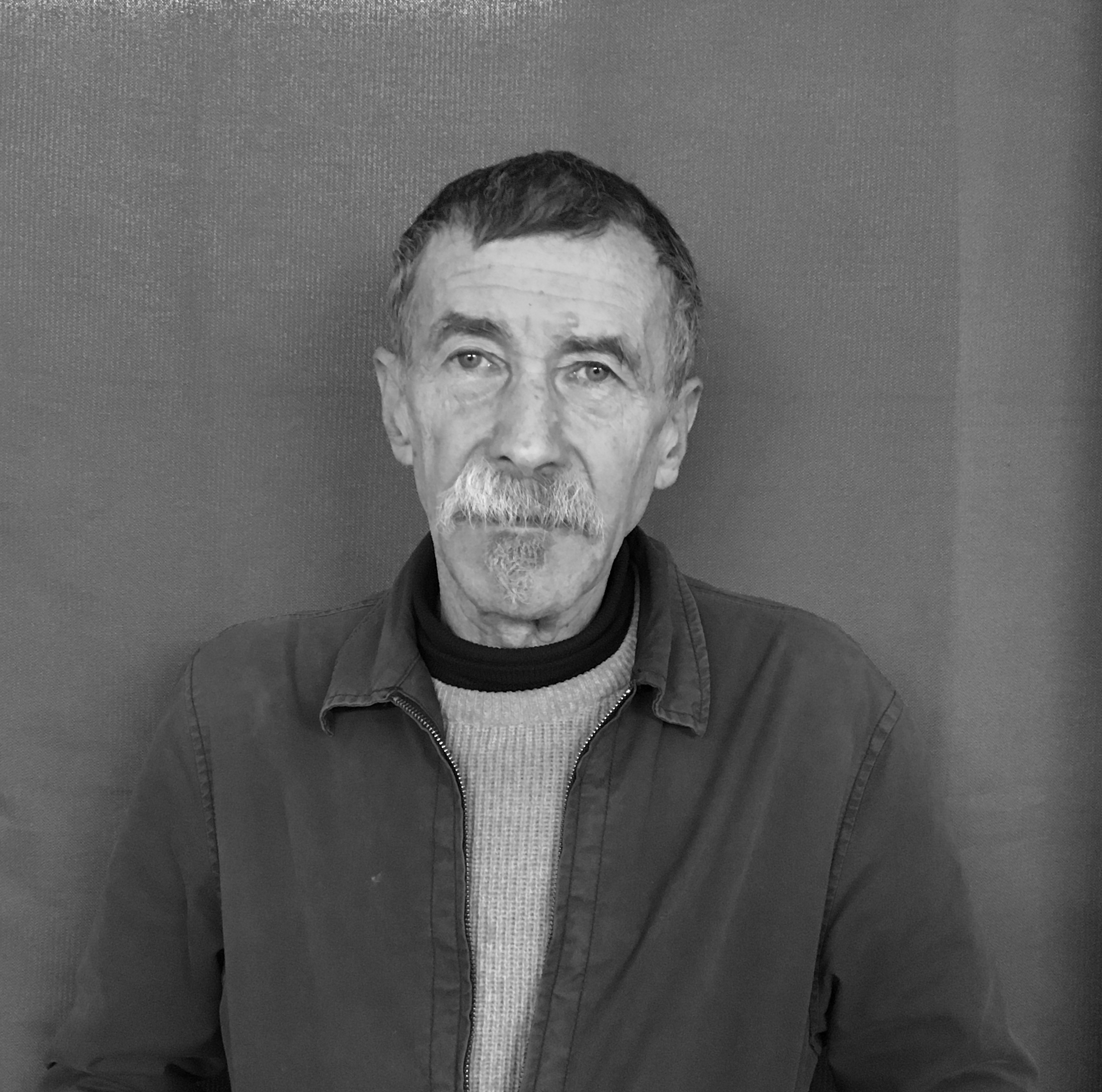
- Born: August 19, 1947; Venice
- Known for: Abstract Painting, Architect
- Notable work: Puzzle 1986
- Movement: Geometric abstraction

Peter Hugo McClure (born August 19, 1947) is a British artist, poet and architect who is classified as a Geometric abstractionist.

== History ==
Peter was born in an RAF hospital in Venice, Italy to a Scottish Father and Serbian Mother.

He studied Art and Architecture at Waltham Forest Technical College, and Art at Ealing. He is best known for geometric art which has influenced furniture design, and featured on book covers and in magazines.

McClure's fascination for magic squares, prime numbers, the golden ratio and geometry has driven much of his artwork.

McClure is currently living and working on the Kintyre peninsula.

== The Millhouse Gallery ==
In 1989, McClure took over the running of the Millhouse restaurant in Penzance and converted it into a mini arts centre as a gallery venue for chess and the arts.

As the first and only vegan restaurant in Penzance at the time, it became a magnet for local and international celebrities including Jonathan Guinness, 3rd Baron Moyne and Susan (Shoe) Taylor who were regular visitors.

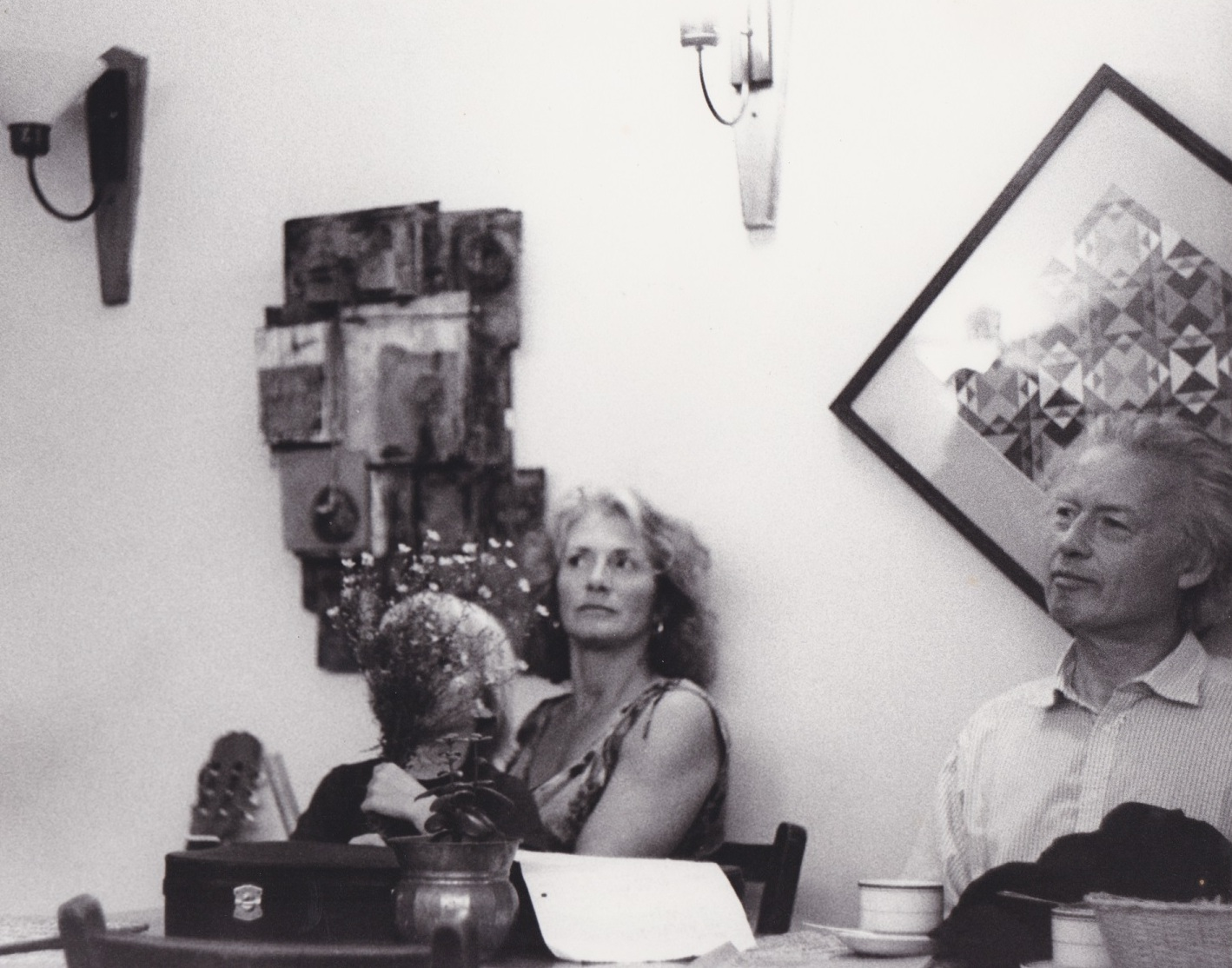
Jonathan Guinness, Shoe Taylor and Tom at the Millhouse, Penzance

== Galleries and locations exhibiting his work ==
- Roberts & Margari Trust, North Virginia
- Arnold Ashkenazy Foundation, Los Angeles, USA
- Shoe Taylor / Jonathan Guinness Trust, Cornwall / Ireland
- Unity Church, Irvine, Orange County, USA
- Far North Regional Museum, Kataia, New Zealand
- Serbian Church, Ladbrooke Grove, London
- Bridgeman Art Library, Westbourne Grove, London
- Taipa Area School, Far North, New Zealand
- Sara Rudman Collection, Penzance, Cornwall
- "District & Urban" Enterprises, Westbourne Grove, London
- Keeping It Local, Campbeltown, Scotland
- Tyler Gallery, Mousehole, Cornwall, UK
- Wetherspoons Restaurant / Gallery, St. Ives, Cornwall

== Exhibitions ==
- Google Plus
- Castle Gallery, West Kensington, London - exhibition of photographs - November 1980
- St, Ives Public Library, Cornwall - April 1985
- Penzance Art Centre - April/May 1985
- H.S. Galerie, Heidelberg, F.R.D. - May 1985,
- Galerija Zel, Belgrade, Yugoslavia June 1985
- Koetshuis Kunst Galerie, Amsterdam, Holland Late June 1985
- International Photo Exposition, Belgrade, Oct.1985,
- Kunsthaus, W. Welker, Heidelberg, F.R.D. - April 1986
- Catania Opera House, Scicily - Sept. 1991
- Studio Gallery, Sky Park Circle, Irvine, California, USA March 1993
- Bakehouse Gallery, Penzance - Oct. 1996
- Penzer Gallery, Bread St. Penzannce, Cornwall - March 1997
- Far North Gallery, Kaitaia, N.Z. - Dec. 1999
- Taipa Beach Hotel, Far North, New Zealand - 2000
- Far North Regional Museum Summer 2001
- Local Council Gallery, Oneroa, Waiheke Island, New Zealand - Jan. 2001
- The Garage Studio, Lamorna, Cornwall - Aug/Sep 2002
- Chy Gwella, House of Healing, Penzance - Oct. 2005
- Lamorna Village Hall, Nr. Penzance - Aug. 2006
- St.Ives Arts Club, Cornwall - Oct. 2010
- Mounts Bay Contemporary, Western Promenade, Penzance, Cornwall - 2012
- Central Library, Hartlepool - April 2013
- Chelsea Art Fair, Summer 2017
- The Tyler Gallery, Mousehole, Cornwall - 2017
