= Mary Henry (artist) =

American painter (1913–2009)

- Mary Henry, after receiving the Twining Humber Award for Lifetime Artistic Achievement, 2006.
- Born: Mary M. Dill; March 19, 1913; Sonoma, California
- Died: May 20, 2009 (aged 96); Coupeville, Washington
- Known for: Painting
- Movement: Abstract Art
- Spouse: Wilbur Henry

Mary Henry, "Both Sides Now", 1989, acrylic on canvas, 72 x 96 inches. Like most of Henry's work, the style is geometric abstraction; it is one of several works whose titles are popular culture references, in this case to a Joni Mitchell song.

Mary Henry (March 19, 1913 – May 20, 2009), born Mary M. Dill, was an American artist whose work, most notably large oil paintings and acrylics but also prints, was characteristized by geometric abstraction. Many of her pieces are diptychs and some are triptychs. Some of her work resembles, variously, op art, constructivism, or even psychedelic art.

== Life ==
Born in Sonoma, California, Mary Henry studied 1933–34 at the California College of the Arts (then called the California School of Arts and Crafts) in Oakland, California, where her teachers included modernists Ethel Abeel, Glen Wessels, and Marie Togni. She won a prize in a printmaking contest sponsored by Iowa State University (Ames, Iowa), and was invited there to teach applied art in their home economics department. Her "childhood sweetheart" Wilbur Henry "reluctantly" agreed to marry her and accompany her to Iowa, where he completed a master's degree in entomology while she taught.

During World War II, back in California while her husband served in the military, Henry studied lithography at San Francisco School of Fine Arts and worked drafting engineering drawings at Hewlett-Packard; this drafting experience would later allow her to draw uncommonly straight lines freehand in executing her paintings.

In 1939 in Berkeley, California, Henry attended a lecture by Bauhaus artist László Moholy-Nagy. This led to her studying with him at the Institute of Design in Chicago in 1945, leaving her daughter Suzanne in California with Henry's mother. She studied drawing, architectural drawing, photography, texture, and sculpture; her work was so good as to result in a job offer—the first that the institute had ever made to a woman—but she decided upon her husband's discharge from the military that she had to follow him to Arkansas where he had accepted a job with the U.S. Public Health Service, fighting malaria.

Henry traveled to Europe in 1962; she was divorced in 1964, which marks the beginning of her career as a mature artist. She lived in Mendocino, California, running a bed-and-breakfast and painting. Matthew Kangas writes, "It was as if, after 20 years of fulfilling conventional expectations as a wife, worker, and mother, she was released into a constant stream of creative production, capturing the exuberant hedonism of Northern California, while reined in by the consummate formal control she had assimilated as an American Constructivist in Chicago." Her 1968 show at Arleigh Gallery in San Francisco resulted in a write-up in Artforum.

In 1976, Henry traveled to Alaska before settling in Washington, where she has lived since 1981 on Whidbey Island. Also in 1976, at Centrum in Port Townsend, Washington, she attended a master painter's class with Jack Tworkov, then in his seventies. Tworkov remarked the affinity between their work; according to Kangas, the "linear precision and complexity" of Tworkov's late work owes a great deal to Henry; he, in turn, greatly encouraged her in her work.

Henry still made art until about 2003, but she ceased painting in her early 90s when she could no longer stretch her own canvases.

Henry died after suffering a stroke.

== Honors and awards ==
- Member of American Abstract Artists since 1992
- Flintridge Award for Visual Artists (2001)
- Twining Humber Award for Lifetime Artistic Achievement (2006)

== Shows and collections ==
Henry's work is in the collections of the Seattle Art Museum, Tacoma Art Museum, Portland Art Museum, Institute of Design IIT, Microsoft, Safeco, Hewlett-Packard, and Amgen, among others.

Henry has been particularly championed by curator Matthew Kangas, who included her work in a salon des refuses (Seattle, 1980), in numerous shows (1985–2000) at the Bumbershoot arts festival, and in a 1994 show of works owned by Seattle City Light, as well as curating solo shows of her work at Open Space (Victoria, British Columbia, 1985) and the Wright Exhibition Space (Seattle, 2007).
