= Pierre Clerk =

- Born: April 26, 1928 (age 98); Atlanta, Georgia, United States
- Known for: Painting, Sculpture

Pierre Clerk (born 1928) is a contemporary artist who works primarily in painting and sculpture.

== Life ==
Clerk was born to Canadian parents in Atlanta, Georgia. He lived in Canada between 1932 and 1952. He studied fine arts at McGill University, Loyola College, at Canada School of Art and Design, and at Montreal Museum of Fine Arts. in 1952, he also trained at the Académie Julian in Paris and later at the Accademia di Belle Arti in Florence. Clerk moved to New York in 1959. His work has been widely recognized, and he has won grants from a number of institutions, including Canadian Council Awards; Tamarind Fel, Albuquerque, New Mexico; United States Information Service Exhibition Grant; Municipal Art Society Grant; and U.S. Department of State Travel Grant. Currently, he lives and works in Southwest France and in New York City.

== Work ==
Pierre Clerk's abstract, geometrical works are held in many museums and galleries in the United States and Canada, such as: Museum of Modern Art; Solomon R. Guggenheim Museum; Whitney Museum of American Art; National Gallery of Art, Washington, D.C.; National Gallery of Canada, Ottawa; Montreal Museum of Fine Arts; Brooklyn Museum; Glasgow Art Museum, Scotland; New Mexico University, Albuquerque; Queens College, New York; and State University of New York, Purchase. Several of Clerk's paintings, serigraphs, and tapestries are in the collection of the Port Authority of New York and New Jersey and have been exhibited at the international arrivals building at John F. Kennedy International Airport and the World Trade Center. In addition, a collection of his papers (covering the years 1956 through 1982) are in the Smithsonian: Archives of American Art, Smithsonian Institution, Washington, D.C.

Clerk first came to national attention in the U.S. in the spring of 1956, when he was chosen as one of three artists to be featured in the Museum of Modern Art's 9th New Talent Exhibition. The New York Times described the show as "one of the best in this series" and went on to say: "Clerk's boldly colored and decorative non-objective oils are in the general tradition of Matisse and are laid out in deliberate patterns like those in an oriental rug, handsome and clear in their planning.". Since the mid-1950s, his work has been included in many group and solo shows. In 2010, the gallery Cortex Athletico in Bordeaux, France, mounted a large show of paintings and smaller sculptures. Called 70/10, the show presented a dialogue between recent works and those of the 1970s. In 2011, a very large retrospective of his works was shown in the Base Sous Marine in Bordeaux.

Speaking of his own work, Clerk cites Theo van Doesburg, Piet Mondrian, Neoplasticism, Brâncuși, and the cubism of Picasso as major influences.

== Monumental Sculpture ==
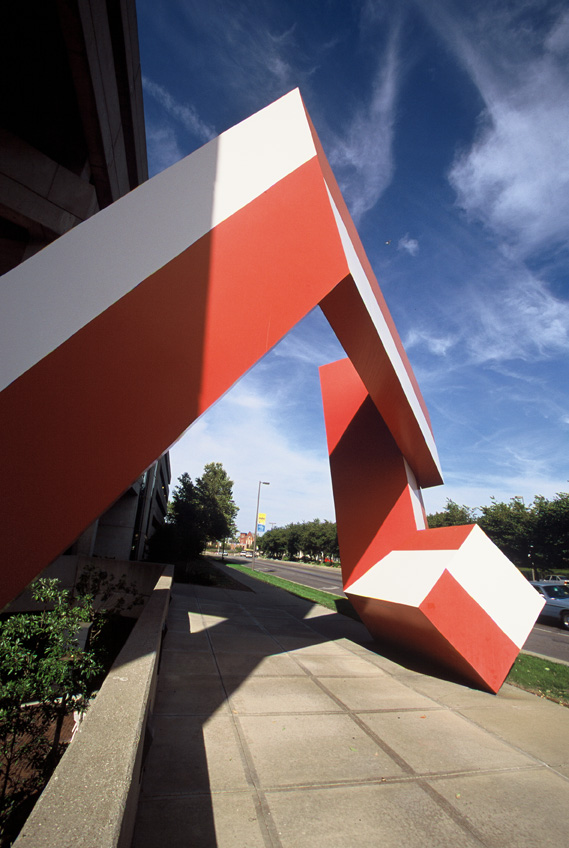
Pierre Clerk, City Candy, 1983. Aluminum. Summit Street, Toledo, Ohio. Arts Commission of Greater Toledo

In addition to painting, Clerk has also created monumental sculptures of note. In 1977, four of Clerk's large sculptures, which the artist crafted specifically for the location, were installed at Waterside Plaza, an apartment complex on Manhattan's East River. Sponsored by the Public Arts Council of the Municipal Art Society, the installation garnered a positive review in The New York Times. Of the large geometric pieces, Paul Goldberger wrote: "The success of the Clerk exhibition, which will remain at Waterside Plaza for an indefinite period, is an obvious reminder of the extent to which sculpture can assist in solving an architectural problem.... The sculptures neither give in to the buildings nor fight them; instead they treat them almost playfully, teasing the towers' somber forms, yet never becoming shrill or unkind. It is the sort of balance more urban sculpture should strike."

Clerk's two-story City Candy (1983), described as a "commanding presence" by the Toledo Blade, weighs 25,000 pounds. The red-and-white striped aluminum sculpture, which measures 42 feet by 48 feet by 24 feet and has one base inside a parking garage and the other on the adjacent sidewalk, was named by the winner of a 1984 "name the sculpture" contest. As the first city in Ohio to adopt a one percent for arts program, Toledo, Ohio boasts more than 80 examples of public, outdoor art, which include large sculptures, environmental structures, and murals. These works are organized into a number of tours. The Toledo Blade cites City Candy as being "among our favorites" on the Promenade Park–River Walk tour. But, as almost all public art does, City Candy has drawn its share of criticism, and it "continues to be a controversial sculpture with opinions being voiced strongly on both sides."

== Personal exhibitions ==
2020-2021: "Paintings-Sculptures", Francis Maer Fine Arts Gallery, Gand, Belgique

2017: "Works", Galerie Thomas Bernard - Cortex Athletico, Paris, France

2014: "The Long View", Galerie Thomas Bernard - Cortex Athletico, Paris, France

2013: "Pierre Clerk, Peintures, Sérigraphies, Sculptures", Salle des Dominicains, Château Canon La Gaffelière, Saint-Émilion, France

2013: "Driven to abstraction", Musée Gajac, Villeneuve-sur-Lot, France (France 3 Aquitaine on Dailymotion)

2012: "Out of his mind", Galerie Crone, Berlin, Allemagne

2012: "Out of his mind", Galerie Thomas Bernard - Cortex Athletico, Bordeaux, France

2011: «Couleur, forme, espace», Base Sous Marine, Bordeaux, France

2010: "70 / 10", Galerie Thomas Bernard - Cortex Athletico, Bordeaux, France

2009: "Constructs", Galerie Thomas Bernard - Cortex Athletico, Bordeaux, France

2003: "Pierre Clerk", Aurelio Atefanini Arte Moderna e Contemporanea, Firenza, Italy

1989: "Pierre Clerk: selected works", Square One Gallery, Block Island, RI

1987: "Pierre Clerk: cutout reliefs, recent sculptures", DiLaurenti Gallery, New York City

1981: "Pierre Clerk: oeuvres récentes, Painting and sclupture", Centre culturel canadien, Paris, France

1978: "Cutout Reliefs", Recent Sculptures, DiLaurenti Gallery, New York

1978: "Œuvres Récentes", Centre culturel canadien, Paris, France

1977-1978: Rio Bec, Ossokmanuan, Double Occupancy and Untilted, Monumental Outdoor Sculpture Program, Public Art Fund, New York

1977-1978: "Pierre Clerc: paintings, tapestries, grapics" :

Part I: sponsored by USIA, traveling exhibit, Quito, Mexico, Guatemala, New Delhi, Islamabad, Kabul, Tehran (American Center)

Part II: sponsored by USIA, traveling exhibit, Tokyo, Hong Kong (Honk Hong Art Center), Singapore, Manila (Metropolitan Museum of Art), Kuala Lumpur, Sydney, Wellington

1977: "PIERRE CLERK AT WATERSIDE", Outdoor monumental sculpture exhibit, sponsored by The Public Art Fund, NYC

1976-1977: "NY Pierre Clerk", Everson Museum of Art, Syracuse, New York

1972: Pierre Clerk, Galerie Moos, Montréal, Canada; Gimpel Weitzenhoffer, New York

1971: Gimpel Hanover, Zurich, Switzerland; Gimpel Fils, London, England

1965-1967: Siegelaub Gallery, New York

1958: Il Cavallino Galleria, Venice, Italy; Cittadella Gallery, Ascona, Switzerland

1957: Montreal Museum of Fine Arts, Montreal; Benô Gallery, Zurich, Switzerland; New Gallery, New York

1956: Galleria Totti, Milan, Italy

1955: Numero Galleria, Florence, Italy

== Group exhibitions ==
- 2017 : FIAC, Galerie Thomas Bernard - Cortex Athletico, Grand Palais, Paris, France
- 2016 : « The Future is the Future », Galerie Thomas Bernard - Cortex Athletico, Paris; « The Past is the Past », Galerie Thomas Bernard - Cortex Athletico, Paris
- 2014 : Présentation des nouvelles acquisitions, Artothèque, Villeurbanne, France; « Quelque chose à vous dire », galerie Thomas Bernard - Cortex Athletico Paris, France
- 2013 : « Campagnes / campagne », galerie Thomas Bernard - Cortex Athletico, Bordeaux, France
- 2012 : « My own private #1, The Snake », galerie Thomas Bernard - Cortex Athletico, Paris, France
- 2011 : Artbrussels 2011, galerie Thomas Bernard - Cortex Athletico, Bruxelles, Belgique; « Il est si doux... », galerie Thomas Bernard - Cortex Athletico, Château Giscours, Margaux, France
- 2010 : « Matériaux divers et autres bonnes nouvelles », galerie Thomas Bernard - Cortex Athletico, Bordeaux, France; « Armory Show », galerie Thomas Bernard - Cortex Athletico, New York, NY
- 2009 : FIAC, galerie Thomas Bernard - Cortex Athletico, Paris, France
- 1990 : « Contemporary Sculpture at Chesterwood », Stockbridge, MA; Albright Knox Museum, Buffalo, NY
- 1988 : « Contemporary Sculpture at Chesterwood », Stockbridge, MA
- 1987 : Katharina Perlow Gallery, New York, NY; Robert Kidd Gallery, Birmingham, MI; Kauffman Galeries, Houston, TX; Hokin Gallery, Bay Harbor Islands, FL; D. Erlien Fine Art, Milwaukee, WI; Zack/Shuster Gallery, Boca Raton, FL; Contemporary Sculpture at Chesterwood, Stockbridge, MA
- 1981 : « Sculpture on Shoreline Sites (outdoor) », Fordham University-Lincoln Center, NY; Chicago International Art Exposition, « Sculpture ‘81 » (outdoor), Philadelphie, PA
- 1976 : « Painting & Sculpture Today », Indianapolis Museum of Art, Indianapolis, IN; British International Print Biennial, Bradford, Royaume-Uni; Spectrum Canada, Montreal, Canada; Artists Celebrate the Bicentennial, worldwide Bicentennial Banners, Hirshhorn Museum, Washington, DC.
- 1971 : « Rosc ‘71 », International Exhibition of Modern Art, Dublin, Irlande; ROSC Modern Graphics, Waterford, Irlande; New Acquisitions, Whitney Museum, New York, NY
- 1968 : 7th Biennial of Painting, Ottawa, Canada
- 1967 : « EXPO ‘67 », Montreal, Canada
- 1962 : World Fair, Bruxelles, Belgique; Canadian Pavillon, Biennial of Art, Ottawa, Canada
- 1959 : Carnegie International, Pittsburgh, PA
- 1958 : Biennial of Venise, Italy
- 1956 : New Acquisitions, Museum of Modern Art, New York, NY; Art Gallery of Toronto, Toronto, Canada; Biennial of Venise, Italy
- 1955 : New Talent Exhibition, Museum of Modern Art, New York, NY

== Civic Involvement ==
In 1996, Clerk lead the SoHo Community Council, an ad hoc group of artists and other Soho residents who sued the New York State Liquor Authority for granting a liquor license to a nightclub on Grand Street in Manhattan. Opponents of the club, who included actor Willem Dafoe; Christopher Burge, the chairman of Christie's; along with the Soho Alliance, another community group; and the local community board; charged that the authority had broken a 1993 law which was intended to prevent residential neighborhoods from becoming over-saturated with bars and nightclubs. The case went to the State Supreme Court, where, in 1997 the judge ruled in favor of Clerk and the neighborhood groups. The judge ordered an immediate revocation of the club's liquor license. Clerk told The New York Times that the ruling "sends the message to the S.L.A. that it can not frivolously issue licenses in opposition to what the community wants, especially here in SoHo."
