= Geometric abstraction =

Form of abstract art involving geometry

František Kupka, Amorpha, Fugue en deux couleurs (Fugue in Two Colors), 1912, oil on canvas, 210 x 200 cm, National Gallery in Prague

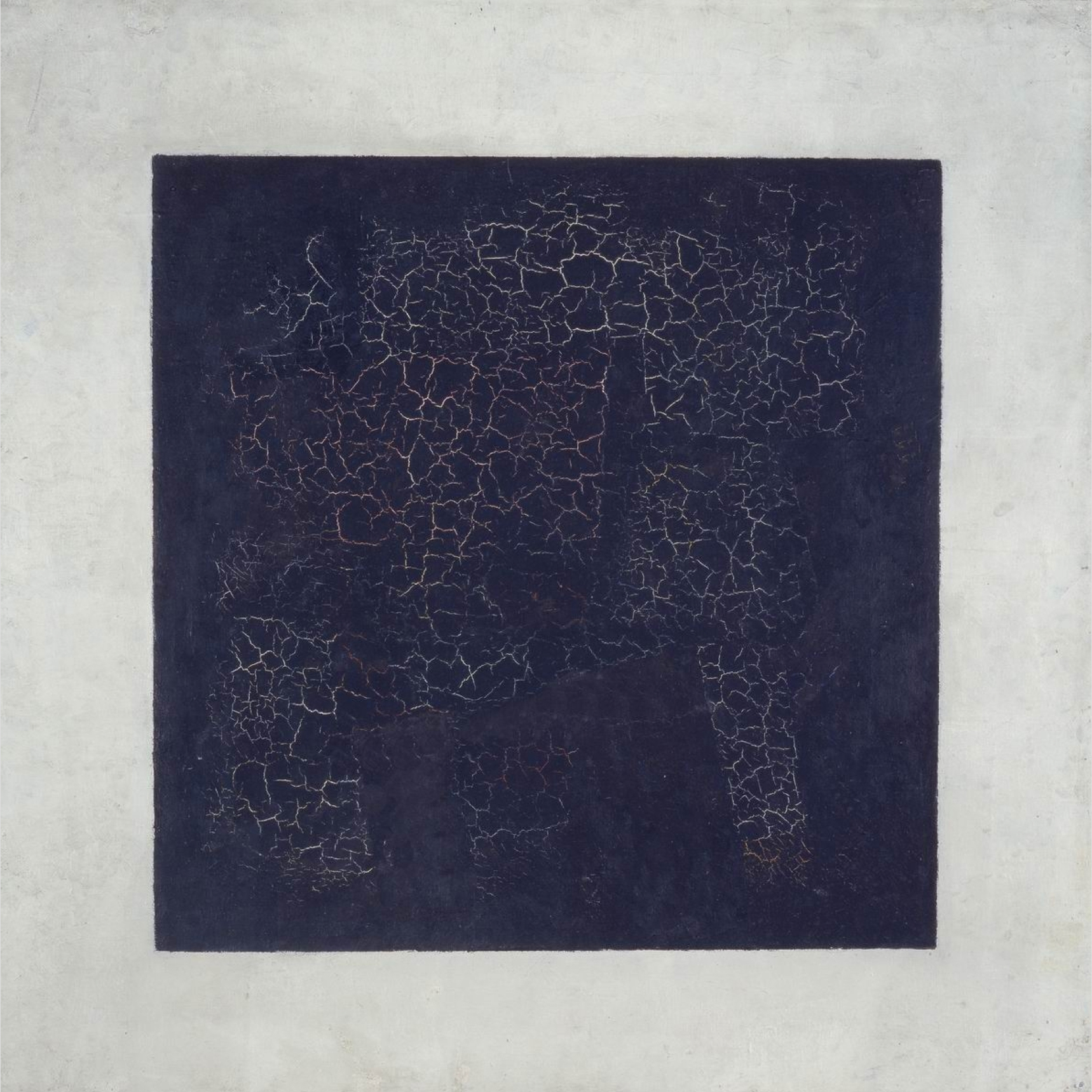
Kazimir Malevich, Black Square, 1915, oil on linen, 79.5 x 79.5 cm, Tretyakov Gallery, Moscow

Geometric abstraction is a form of abstract art based on the use of geometric forms sometimes, though not always, placed in non-illusionistic space and combined into non-objective (non-representational) compositions. Although the genre was popularized by avant-garde artists in the early twentieth century, similar motifs have been used in art since ancient times.

== History ==
Geometric abstraction is present among many cultures throughout history both as decorative motifs and as art pieces themselves. Islamic art, in its prohibition of depicting religious figures, is a prime example of this geometric pattern-based art, which existed centuries before the movement in Europe and in many ways influenced this Western school. Aligned with and often used in the architecture of Islamic civilations spanning the 7th century-20th century, geometric patterns were used to visually connect spirituality with science and art, both of which were key to Islamic thought of the time.

== Scholarly analysis ==
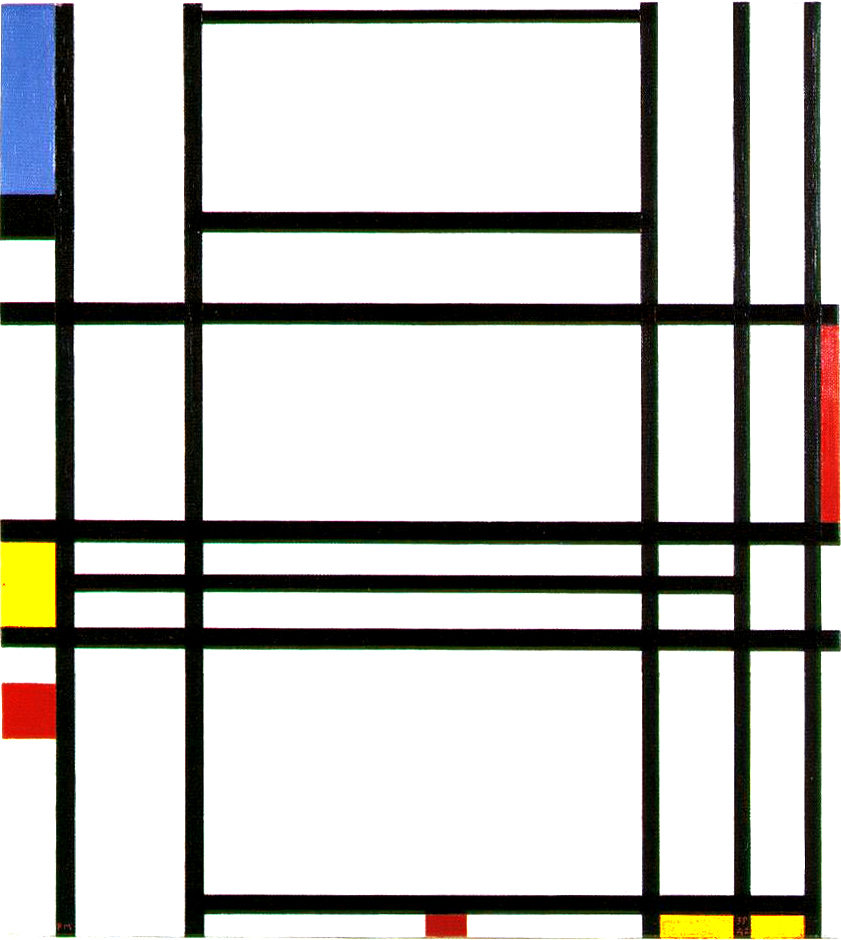
Piet Mondrian, Composition No. 10, 1939–1942, oil on canvas

Throughout 20th-century art historical discourse, critics and artists working within the reductive or pure strains of abstraction have often suggested that geometric abstraction represents the height of a non-objective art practice, which necessarily stresses or calls attention to the root plasticity and two-dimensionality of painting as an artistic medium. Thus, it has been suggested that geometric abstraction might function as a solution to problems concerning the need for modernist painting to reject the illusionistic practices of the past while addressing the inherently two dimensional nature of the picture plane as well as the canvas functioning as its support. Wassily Kandinsky, one of the forerunners of pure non-objective painting, was among the first modern artists to explore this geometric approach in his abstract work. Other examples of pioneer abstractionists such as Kasimir Malevich and Piet Mondrian have also embraced this approach towards abstract painting. Mondrian's painting "Composition No. 10" (1939–1942) clearly defines his radical but classical approach to the construction of horizontal and vertical lines, as Mondrian wrote, "constructed with awareness, but not with calculation, led by high intuition, and brought to harmony and rhythm."

Just as there are both two-dimensional and three-dimensional geometries, the abstract sculpture of the 20th century was of course no less affected than painting by geometricizing tendencies. Georges Vantongerloo and Max Bill, for example, are perhaps best known for their geometric sculpture, although both of them were also painters; and indeed, the ideals of geometric abstraction find nearly perfect expression in their titling (e.g., Vantongerloo's "Construction in the Sphere") and pronouncements (e.g., Bill's statement that "I am of the opinion that it is possible to develop an art largely on the basis of mathematical thinking.") Expressionist abstract painting, as practiced by artists such as Jackson Pollock, Franz Kline, Clyfford Still, and Wols, represents the opposite of geometric abstraction.

== Relationship with music ==
Abstract art has also historically been likened to music in its ability to convey emotional or expressive feelings and ideas without reliance upon or reference to recognizable objective forms already existent in reality. Wassily Kandinsky has discussed this connection between music and painting, as well as how the practice of classical composition had influenced his work, at length in his seminal essay Concerning the Spiritual in Art. (1912)

== Selected artists ==
Artists who have worked extensively in geometric abstraction include:

- Nadir Afonso
- Josef Albers
- Amadour
- Richard Anuszkiewicz
- Mino Argento
- Hans Arp
- Rudolf Bauer
- Willi Baumeister
- Karl Benjamin
- Max Bill
- Ilya Bolotowsky
- Patrick Henry Bruce
- Kenneth Wayne Bushnell
- Norman Carlberg
- Ilya Chashnik
- Joseph Csaky
- Nassos Daphnis
- Ronald Davis
- Robert Delaunay
- Sonia Delaunay
- Tony DeLap
- Jean Dewasne
- Burgoyne Diller
- David Diao
- Ding Yi
- Thomas Downing
- Lorser Feitelson
- María Freire
- Günter Fruhtrunk
- Albert Gleizes
- Frederick Hammersley
- Erwin Hauer
- Mary Henry
- Gottfried Honegger
- Bryce Hudson
- Al Held
- Auguste Herbin
- Carmen Herrera
- Hans Hofmann
- Budd Hopkins
- Wassily Kandinsky
- Ellsworth Kelly
- Hilma af Klint
- Ivan Kliun
- František Kupka
- Ronnie Landfield
- Pat Lipsky
- El Lissitzky
- Michael Loew
- Peter Lowe
- Kazimir Malevich
- Robert Mangold
- Agnes Martin
- Kenneth Martin
- John McLaughlin
- Peter Hugo McClure
- László Moholy-Nagy
- Vera Molnár
- Piet Mondrian
- François Morellet
- Aurélie Nemours
- Barnett Newman
- Ben Nicholson
- Marion Nicoll
- Kenneth Noland
- Alejandro Otero
- Rinaldo Paluzzi
- I. Rice Pereira
- Francis Picabia
- Harvey Quaytman
- Ad Reinhardt
- Jack Reilly
- Bridget Riley
- Ivo Ringe
- Dorothea Rockburne
- Alexander Rodchenko
- Morgan Russell
- Sean Scully
- Victor Servranckx
- Leon Polk Smith
- Julian Stanczak
- Henryk Stażewski
- Jeffrey Steele
- Frank Stella
- Sophie Taeuber-Arp
- Leo Valledor
- Theo van Doesburg
- Georges Vantongerloo
- Victor Vasarely
- Friedrich Vordemberge-Gildewart
- Charmion von Wiegand
- Zanis Waldheims
- Gordon Walters
- Neil Williams
- Stanton Macdonald-Wright
- Peter Young
- Larry Zox

== See also ==
- American Abstract Artists
- Concrete art
- Formalism (art)
- Hard-edge painting
- Lyrical Abstraction
- Post-painterly abstraction
- Shaped canvas
