= Ronald Davis =

American painter (1937–2025)

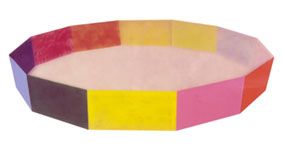
- Ring, 1968, 60 1/2 × 134 inches, polyester resin and fiberglass, (Dodecagon series), Museum of Modern Art, New York City
- Born: June 29, 1937; Santa Monica, California, U.S.
- Died: November 19, 2025 (aged 88); Arroyo Hondo, New Mexico, U.S.
- Education: University of Wyoming, San Francisco Art Institute
- Known for: Painting
- Movement: Abstract Expressionism, Geometric abstraction, Abstract Illusionism, Lyrical Abstraction, Hard-edge painting, Shaped canvas painting, Color field painting, Digital art, Digital painting and 3D Computer Graphics
- Awards: 1962 Yale-Norfolk Summer School Grantee

Ronald Davis (June 29, 1937 – November 19, 2025) was an American painter whose work was associated with geometric abstraction, abstract illusionism, lyrical abstraction, hard-edge painting, shaped canvas painting, color field painting, and 3D computer graphics. He was a veteran of more than seventy solo exhibitions and hundreds of group exhibitions.

== Background ==
Born in Santa Monica, California, he was raised in Cheyenne, Wyoming. In 1955–56, he attended the University of Wyoming. In 1959 at the age of 22, he became interested in painting. In 1960–64, he attended the San Francisco Art Institute. Abstract expressionism, the prevailing artistic movement of the time, would have an influence on many of his future works. In 1962, he was a Yale-Norfolk Summer School Grantee. In 1963, his paintings became hard-edged, geometric and optical in style, and by 1964 his works were shown in important museums and galleries. He lived and worked in Los Angeles, 1965–71, and in Malibu, California, 1972–90. From 1991, he lived and worked in Arroyo Hondo on the outskirts of Taos, New Mexico. He died there on November 19, 2025, at the age of 88. At the time of his death he had been suffering from both COPD and kidney disease.

== Career ==
Davis, from the earliest days of his career, had a significant impact on contemporary abstract painting of the mid-1960s. According to art critic Michael Fried:

Ron Davis is a young California artist whose new paintings, recently shown at the Tibor de Nagy Gallery in New York, are among the most significant produced anywhere during the past few years, and place him, along with Stella and Bannard, at the forefront of his generation.

He had his first one-person exhibition at the Nicholas Wilder Gallery in Los Angeles in 1965.

Barbara Rose wrote an in depth essay about Davis' paintings of the 1960s in the catalogue accompanying an exhibition of his Dodecagon Series in 1989 in Los Angeles. Among other observations she wrote:

Davis saw a way to use Duchamp's perspective studies and transparent plane in The Large Glass for pictorial purposes. Instead of glass, he used fiberglass to create a surface that was equally transparent and detached from any illusion of reality. Because his colored pigments are mixed into a fluid resin and harden quickly, multiple layers of color may be applied without becoming muddy. his is essentially an inversion of Old Master layering and glazing except that color is applied behind rather than on top of the surface.

Alone among his contemporaries, Davis was equally concerned with traditional problems of painting: space, scale, detail, color relationships and illusions as he was with the California emphasis on hi-tech craft and industrial materials. How to reconcile the literal object produced with the latest technology with transcendental metaphor became the problem that occupied throughout the Sixties.

In an Artforum article in 1970 artist/art critic Walter Darby Bannard commented: "Though Davis is plagued by 'series' ideas, and has yet to get a grip on the inherent monumentality of his style, he is young and inspired, and these things will evolve naturally." From 1966 to 1972, Ron Davis created geometric shaped, illusionistic paintings using polyester resins and fiberglass. About Davis' paintings of the late 1960s in an essay accompanying the Ronald Davis retrospective exhibition Forty Years of Abstraction, at the Butler Institute of American Art in 2002, the abstract painter Ronnie Landfield wrote: "the Dodecagons from 1968–69 remain among the most visually stunning, audacious and intellectually interesting bodies of work made by an abstract painter in the last half of the twentieth century." The 70's produced another prominent series with the "Snap Line I" canvas art featuring futuristic Pollockian splashed backgrounds, chalk-line perfection, and hard-edged acrylic monoliths up to 19 feet. The artist's flair for color had matured and is on full display. To paraphrase the artisan himself: "I had one platinum album and one gold album, the resin paintings and the snap lines."

In 1966, Davis was an instructor at the University of California, Irvine. Also in that year he had his first one-man exhibition at the Tibor de Nagy Gallery in New York City and a solo exhibition at Leo Castelli Gallery in 1968.

His works are held in the collections of the Museum of Modern Art in New York City, the Tate Gallery, London, the Los Angeles County Museum of Art and the Art Institute of Chicago and he has been awarded a National Endowment for the Arts grant. Since the 1990s, he has worked in digital painting and digital art., while still exploring his roots with smaller concept hand painted items.

== See also ==
- Digital art
- Digital painting

=== Works cited ===
- Alley, Ronald (1981). "Ronald Davis". Catalogue of the Tate Gallery's Collection of Modern Art other than Works by British Artists. London: Tate Gallery and Sotheby Parke-Bernet. pp. 143–4 – via Tate.org.uk.
- Bannard, Walter Darby (January 1970). "Notes on American Painting of the Sixties". Artforum. 8 (5): 40–45 – via Irondavis.com.
- Fried, Michael (April 1967). "Ronald Davis: Surface and Illusion Artforum". Irondavis.com. 5 (8): 37–41, cover illus.: Six-Ninths Blue, 1966.
- Jackson, Charlotte (2008). "Ronald Davis". CharlotteJackson.com. Charlotte Jackson Fine Art. Archived from the original on 2012-10-12.
- Landfield, Ronnie (2002). "The Essence Of Abstraction". Irondavis.com.
- Rose, Barbara (1988). "Ronald Davis: Objects and Illusions". Irondavis.com.
