= Jack Lembeck =

American painter and sculptor

- Born: John Edgar Lembeck; 1942 (age 83–84); St. Louis, Missouri, U.S.
- Education: University of Kansas (BFA); Yale University (MFA)
- Known for: Painting, sculpture
- Movement: Abstract illusionism

John Edgar Lembeck (born in 1942) is an American painter and sculptor known for his abstract illusionism paintings and installation art.

== Early life and education ==
Lembeck was born in St. Louis, Missouri. He received a BFA from the University of Kansas and an MFA from Yale University in 1970, where he remained as an instructor in Yale's art department until 1972.

== Career ==
After leaving Yale, Lembeck established a career in SoHo, Manhattan, as a professional artist, exhibiting his paintings with the Louis K. Meisel Gallery and nationally and internationally. His works are included in the permanent collections of the Guggenheim Museum, The Phoenix Art Museum, the Detroit Institute of Arts, and the Orlando Museum of Art, among others.

In 1994, Lembeck in collaboration with Jeremy Gardiner and Susan Banks, established LANDMIND to create a method for artists to become an influential and integral part of Miami's ever evolving environment by providing a forum of collaboration between artists, students and community members to share ideas, design and execute environmental art projects. Two key projects were the Brittle Star Park project at Miami Dade Community College and a project named Windscape in Bayfront Park, Downtown Miami, Florida.

== Personal life ==
Jack met his wife, Mary, while attending Yale University. Their son, Jeff, was the best friend of Etan Patz.
