= Abstract illusionism =

Abstract illusionism is a name coined by art historian and critic Barbara Rose in 1967. Louis K. Meisel independently coined the term to define an artistic movement that came into prominence in the United States during the mid-1970s.

== History ==
The works were generally derivative of expressionistic, and hard-edge abstract painting styles, with the added elements of perspective, artificial light sources, and simulated cast shadows to achieve the illusion of three-dimensional space on a two-dimensional surface. Abstract illusionism also differed from traditional Trompe-l'œil ("fool the eye") art in that the pictorial space seemed to project in front of, or away from, the canvas surface, as opposed to receding into the picture plane as in traditional perspective-based painting. The artists involved in this rebellion, working strictly within the context of abstract painting, were responding to harsh regulations put on abstract painting by abstract art critics including Clement Greenberg and Harold Rosenberg. Their insistence on flatness of the picture plane was subsequently adopted by numerous Post-painterly abstraction and Color field painters, and also carried into Pop art with artists such as Andy Warhol and Roy Lichtenstein. Primarily, though, this "flatness" dogma applied to abstract paintings, as opposed to the pictorial realism of trompe l'oeil. By the early 1980s, many of the visual devices that originated in Abstract Illusionism were appropriated into the commercial world and served a wide variety of applications in graphic design, fabric design, and the unlikely decoration of commercial products and even recreational vehicles. This proliferation of commercialism in Abstract Illusionist imagery eventually led to the disintegration of the original artistic movement, as a number of the original artists abandoned working in the style. Pre-1970 forerunners and practitioners of the style include Ronald Davis, Allan D'Arcangelo, and Al Held.

Artists associated with the 1970s Abstract Illusionism movement, as documented through museum exhibitions and art literature, include James Havard, Jack Lembeck, Joe Doyle (artist), Tony King, Jack Reilly, George D. Green, Michael B. Gallagher, and John Mikel Thomas.

The first major museum exhibitions to survey Abstract Illusionism were "Abstract Illusionism," Paul Mellon Arts Center, Wallingford, CT, 1977; "Seven New York Artists (Abstract Illusionism)", Sewall Art Gallery, Rice University, Houston, TX, 1977; "Breaking the Picture Plane," Tomasulo Gallery, Union College, Cranford, NJ; and "The Reality of Illusion", curated by Donald Brewer of the University of Southern California, which originated in 1979 at the Denver Art Museum and traveled to the Oakland Museum, the Herbert F. Johnson Museum at Cornell University, the University of Southern California, and the Honolulu Museum of Art. A number of exhibitions were organized and assembled by the leading dealer of the genre, Louis K. Meisel who presented important artists in solo and group exhibitions throughout the seventies at 141 Prince Street in SoHo.

In 1972, the English critic Bryan Robertson also used the term “Abstract Illusionism” to characterize sculptures by Kenneth Draper, Nigel Hall and William Tucker and paintings by Paul Huxley and Bridget Riley.

== General references ==
- Brewer, Donald. Reality of Illusion, American Art Review Press, 1979, ISBN 0-9602974-0-5
- Blaine, Michael. "Complexities of Illusion", Artweek, May, 1980
- Velazquez, Cassidy Gerhardt. "Abstract Illusionism: Taking Realism out of Illusion", Colorado State University, 2007
