= Boca Raton Museum of Art =

Museum in Boca Raton, Florida

Boca Museum of Art
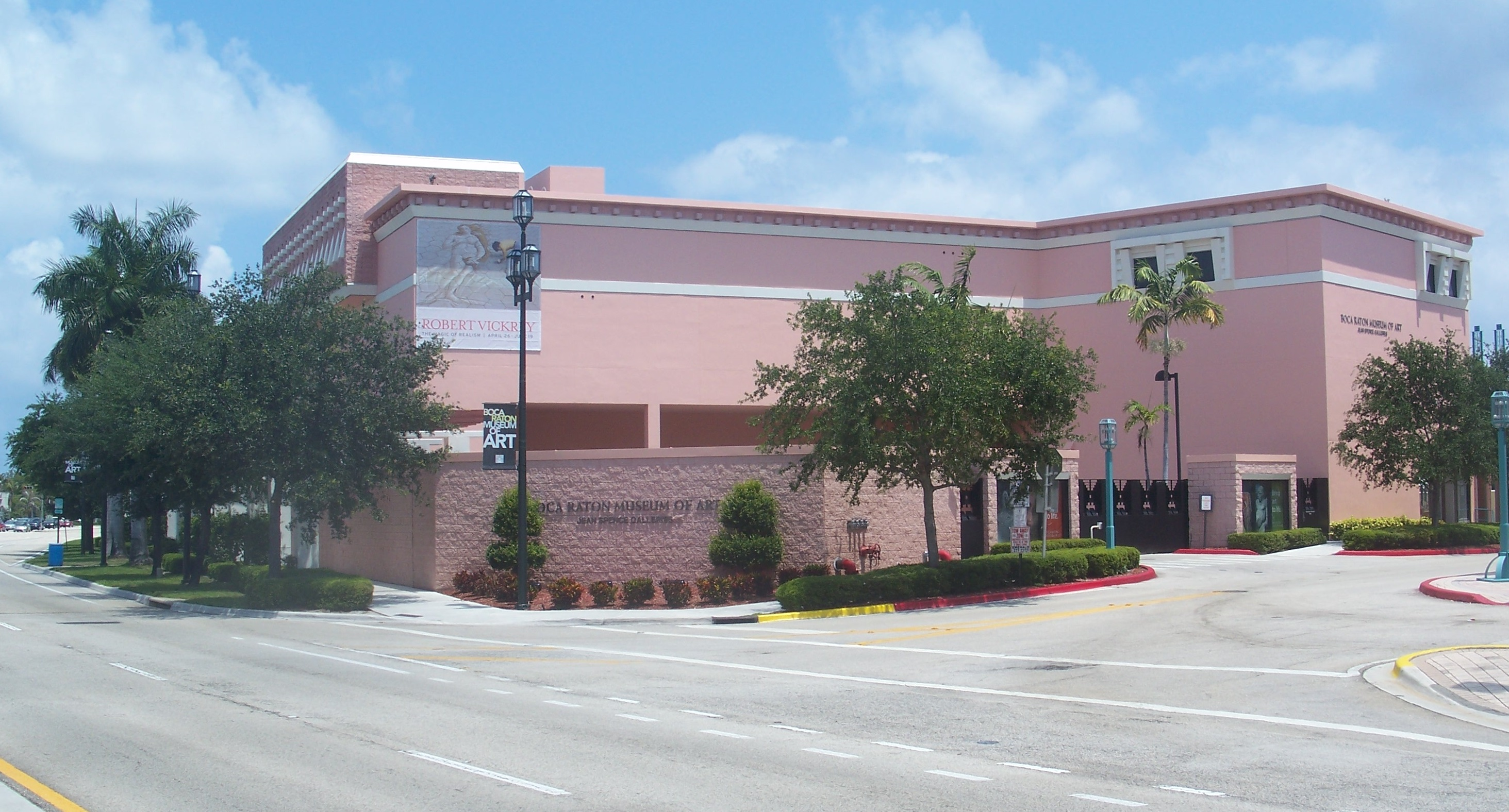

- Location within Florida
- Established: 1940s
- Location: 501 Plaza Real; Boca Raton, Florida; Mizner Park
- Coordinates: 26.356338°N 80.085838°W
- Type: Art
- Director: Ena Heller
- Curator: Keffie Feldman
- Website: bocamuseum.org

Founded by artists, the Boca Raton Museum of Art was established in 1950 as the Art Guild of Boca Raton. The organization has grown to encompass an Art School, Guild, Store, and Museum with permanent collections of contemporary art, photography, non-western art, glass, and sculpture, as well as a diverse selection of special exhibitions. The museum is located at 501 Plaza Real, Boca Raton, Florida in Mizner Park.

== About ==
The Boca Museum of Art features an assortment of traveling exhibitions and permanent collections from established and rising artists including works of art by a number of the great masters. It offers educational programs, artist lectures, films, classes for children, and events. The museums see more than 200,000 patrons annually, making it a major cultural institution in Boca Raton and the surrounding area. The museum promotes sketching in the galleries and even provides clipboards, sketchbooks, and pencils at the front desk. The Boca Raton Museum of Art is a Blue Star museum, meaning it offers free admission to active duty military and their families between Memorial Day and Labor Day. The museum is accredited by the American Alliance of Museums. A newsletter titled "Muse" is published bi-annually and is available for download on the museum's website.

== Permanent Collection ==
- 19th- and 20th-century European and American painting, drawings and sculpture
- The Dr. & Mrs. John J. Mayers Collection of Modern Masters (including Degas, Matisse, Modigliani, Picasso, Seurat and others)
- After Minimalism: Abstract Sculpture from the 1970s and 1980s
- The Art of Artifacts of West Africa
- The Jean and David Colker Collection of Pre-Columbian art and Selections from the Photography Collection
- Sculpture Gardens Collections. More than 30 sculptures are featured at the museum and the art school*

== Artists in the collection ==
- Arman
- Samuel Bak
- Will Barnet
- Mateo Blanco
- Jennifer Bartlett
- Georg Baselitz
- Leonard Baskin
- Rudolf Bauer
- George Bellows
- Isabel Bishop
- Oscar Florianus Bluemner
- Ilya Bolotowsky
- Graciela Rodo Boulanger
- Stanley Boxer
- Georges Braque
- Jack Bush
- Alexander Calder
- Anthony Caro
- Leonora Carrington
- Lynn Chadwick
- Marc Chagall
- John Chamberlain
- Mihail Chemiakin
- Jules Chéret
- Sandro Chia
- Judy Chicago
- Dale Chihuly
- Dan Christensen
- Christo and Jeanne-Claude
- Chryssa
- Howard Chandler Christy
- Chuck Close
- George Cohen
- John Constable
- Lovis Corinth
- Guillaume Cornelis van Beverloo
- Bill Crawford
- Carlos Cruz-Díez
- José Luis Cuevas
- Allan D'Arcangelo
- Haydn Llewellyn Davies
- Arthur Bowen Davies
- Gene Davis
- Stuart Davis
- Adolf Dehn
- Elaine de Kooning
- Sonia Delaunay
- Charles Demuth
- Lesley Dill
- Jim Dine
- Stevan Dohanos
- Enrico Donati
- Roland Dorcely
- Jean Dubuffet
- William R. Dunlap
- Albrecht Dürer
- Edouard Duval-Carrié
- Friedel Dzubas
- Fred Ellis
- Jimmy Ernst
- Max Ernst
- Erté
- M. C. Escher
- Richard Estes
- Lyonel Feininger
- Georges de Feure
- Ernest Fiene
- Leonor Fini
- Eric Fischl
- Audrey Flack
- Jean-Michel Folon
- Sam Francis
- William Glackens
- Nancy Graves
- Cleve Gray
- Stephen Greene
- Al Held
- John Raymond Henry
- Jasper Johns
- Wolf Kahn
- Alex Katz
- Leon Kroll
- Yasuo Kuniyoshi
- Ronnie Landfield
- John Levee
- Pat Lipsky
- Conrad Marca-Relli
- John Marin
- Knox Martin
- John Matos
- Reuben Nakian
- Robert Natkin
- Louise Nevelson
- Costantino Nivola
- Guy Pene du Bois
- Richard Pousette-Dart
- Maurice Prendergast
- David Remfry
- Paul Reed
- I. Rice Pereira
- Betye Saar
- Italo Scanga
- Jacques Soisson
- Julian Stanczak
- Akio Takamori
- Jacques Villon
- Jerry Weiss
- Adja Yunkers

== Gallery ==
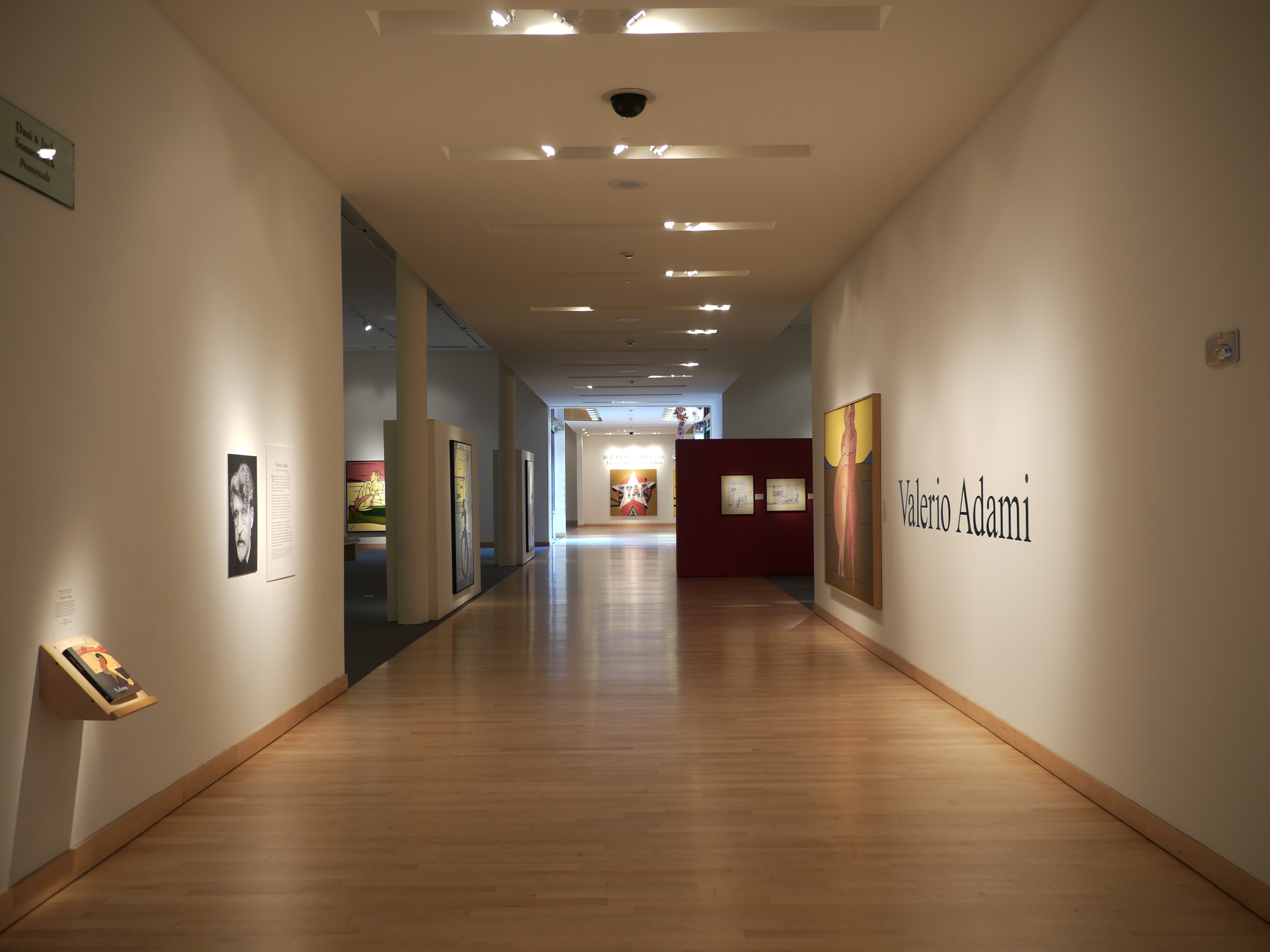
Valerio Adami exhibition

== The Art School ==
The Boca Raton Museum of Art offers multiple classes through its art school, the museum's teaching branch. The art school is located at the museum's original Palmetto Park Road location. There are classes available for both novice and experienced artists. The variety of classes range from photography, to weaving, to ceramics, to jewelry making. A summer art camp for ages five to twelve is also offered.

== The Artists' Guild ==
The guild is an auxiliary of the Boca Raton Museum of Art. It was created by the museum's board of trustees in 1984. The guild holds over twenty exhibitions throughout the year and the proceeds from the art sales go to the museum. The guild is open to both artists and lovers of art.
