= Mino Argento =

Italian painter (born 1927)

- Born: January 5, 1927 (age 99); Rome, Italy
- Known for: Painter, architect
- Movement: Abstract expressionism, lyrical abstraction, geometric abstraction, minimal art, impressionism, collage, monochrome painting

Mino Argento (born January 5, 1927) is an Italian painter, mainly depicting abstract themes on canvas and paper.

== Life and work ==
Mino Argento was born in Rome, Italy. He began as an architect, and first exhibited paintings at a 1968 exhibition at Gallery Astrolobio in Rome presented by Marcello Venturoli.

Until his arrival in 1969 in New York City, Argento was a figurative painter. He left Italy because of his unwillingness to continue painting in a figurative manner, which he felt was expected in Europe. America, it seemed to him, offered other possibilities.

Upon moving to New York, Argento presented one of his first one-man exhibitions at the Livingston-Learmonth Gallery in 1974. Argento was the gallery's opening artist. He was also represented in London, England, by Nigel Greenwood beginning in 1974. By 1977 he would be represented by Betty Parsons. Throughout the seventies his work would be presented alongside such other well known artists as Frank Stella, Richard Pousette-Dart, Ronald Davis, Ruth Vollmer, Jack Youngerman, Marino Marini, Giorgio de Chirico and Shusaku Arakawa. Later, in 1983 his work would become part of one of the last shows at the Betty Parsons Gallery after her death in 1982.

=== Artistic style ===
In the 1960s Argento worked in oil and canvas collage. Later in the 1970s and 1980s he began to apply an acrylic gesso to prepared canvas, sometimes so thinly brushed that it seemed barely to cover the grayish surface of the canvas. He dealt with the ambiguous subtleties of the interplay of positive-negative space. Argento enjoyed contrasting the hardness and the aridity of penciled lines with sensuous layers of oil. He would build up the white gesso, at times adding oil paint, until it could almost be mistaken for collage. He varied the thickness of drawn lines creating an unusual sensitivity for the weight of various forms. Argento meticulously built up his delicate surfaces, so fragile that every gesture was critical, with layer upon transparent layer of gesso, carefully balancing the tone values of the medium against the intensity of his pencil line. Using oil, acrylic and occasionally graphite in conjunction with the gesso, these high-key paintings are not about "being white" but are essentially concerned with the absence color. His background in architecture pervades his paintings through a sense of geometry.

=== Rome ===
In 1968, Marcello Venturoli wrote:

And one that reaches far greater results pictorial Impressionism Liberty, now going with a realistic, where love and female sovereign, now with a look more amused than ever to the beloved models, but the implications to the environment, rich the decorative details of backgrounds, collages, compartments, which resemble those of Leonardo Cremonini. But while the figure Cremonini and absorbed from the environment and how indiversificata-a conspiracy that do things on people-here in the most bitter but vital Argento, the figure remains sovereign, it is decorated, is complicated in a dressing gown, in drapery, becomes a goddess of rest and relaxation in a situation so composed and lonely, as alluding to the presence of man.

=== New York ===
Mino Argento, New York, 1973

In 1974, John Gruen wrote:

These are geometric abstractions that could be called "White on White" with their delicate, yet boldly differentiated forms and textures. One can see Argento's mind and hand attempting something different within the geometric genre. At times he succeeds, at others, he merely echoes the deja-vu syndromes of shape within shape and closed-hued tonality. Still, one is in the presence of a genuine artist, one who has a most felicitous affinity for making the most out of self-imposed limitations of form and color. If at the moment elegance overrides depth.

In 1975, Ellen Lubell wrote in Arts Magazine:

OK Harris Gallery previously provided a refreshing change of pace. Mino Argento's four white-on-white paintings were variations on the gridded, rectangle-on-rectangle themes, but were enlivened with differences in rhythm and conception. One composition included grayed grids and vertical rectangles in several, more opaque whites, clustered centrally. The keen sense of proportion, the sense of angularity about the rectangles, and the cracked paint within one of them that looked like a natural grid contributed to make this painting a finely tuned, complex example of the genre.

In 1977, Noel Frackman wrote in Arts Magazine:

No lines or forms are extraneous; the application of the paint itself, the juxtapositions of elements all work towards a tense, euclidean harmony. The varying thickness of drawn lines and an unusual sensitivity for the weight of various forms lift these paintings out of the realm of simple geometric constructions into the area of the theoretical. In a sense, these white paintings are philosophical musings on the nature of geometry as pure idea.

In 1977, Michael Florescu wrote in Arts Magazine:

Is this his rendering of a far distant race-memory, the way in which, for instance, the pyramids came to be built, where the raw material of the structure evolved into the mechanics by which similar enterprises came about in the future? Or are we, at this point in time, to interpret the physical effect of mistiness the deliberate fragmentation and obscuring of the image (elsewhere a seemingly endless vista of virgin grid) as representing no less that visible breath of a concerned Creator!

In 1977, Nina Ffrench-Frazier wrote in ARTnews:

Argento deals with the ambiguous subleties of the interplay of positive-negative space. There is more than the mind at first can grasp in these monotone paintings of squares, triangles, grids, and rectangular. Apparently involved with Pythagorean geometry, Argento-much in the same tradition as Filippo Brunelleschi, Bramante and other Renaissance men-is in reality fascinated by the intensely spiritual beauty of Pythagorean philosophy, with which he so marvelously infuses all of his paintings.

In 1980, Michael Florescu wrote in Arts Magazine:

Is his essay "Vicissitudes of the Square", Harold Rosenberg noted, "Painting squares is now no different from painting trees or clowns; the question of the feeling they convey becomes all-important." Argento conveys feeling by means of his play with perspectives, with units of measurement, with directional symbols, with modes of calculation, and with ventors of suggested light, He creates illusions of refraction, causing the spectator to look at his squares. Argento dramatizes distance by the recognition of affirmations and denials within the same picture plane. This particular effect was identified by Theodor Adorno, when he wrote that "distance is not a safety zone, but a field of tension. It is manifested not in relaxing the claim of ideas to truth, but in delicacy and fragility of thinking." This characteristic may be best appreciated if Argento's paintings are considered for what I believe they are: a valid contemporary form of the traditional still life.

=== Los Angeles ===
In 1988, Cathy Curtis wrote in the Los Angeles Times:

Mino Argento's checkerboard-strewn abstractions are an '80s version of the lightweight sensibility of those School of Paris painters who embroidered on the big guys' themes. He specializes in geometric shapes with cloudy edges, expanses of industrial gray touched up with bright-and-airy candy-colored backgrounds. There's a slight bow in the chic direction of architecture (mitered-frame shapes, graph-ruled passages and even the suggestion of a facade or two). It all works best when the shapes are crisp, smartly patterned and manageably small. (Los Angeles premiere exhibition 1988, April Sgro-Riddle Gallery.)

=== Forty years of Italian art ===
Group show of Contemporary Italian art. Twenty-eight artists are represented in 50 pieces of sculpture and painting. Especially rewarding is the display of relatively artists: Mino Argento restrained geometry in his painting wars with the infinity of space in the gentle gradations of background color.

Calcagno's 1962 painting, White Heat, presents fluid but difficult surfaces which suggest both Clyfford Still and Franz Kline. Sculpture for the most part looked far more slick that painting in this exhibition, but Gio Pomodoro enormous bronze slabs in Contatti: 1970, gave an authentic sense of excitement and tension. This reviewer was disappointed to discover that almost all the avant-garde of the early 20th century such as Boccocci, Giorgio de Chirico, Marino Marini (sculptor), Giorgio Morandi and Gustavo Foppiani had been on brief loan from private collections.

=== Fourteen painters ===
The omission stems from a past failure to relate the work of two groups of artists working on opposite sides of Atlantic without contact or influence upon each other yet both equally free of formulated systems or of constitutes "Schools" And the evidence postulated is to bring together "fourteen painters" each offering different yet complementary spatial concepts. Though limited the range exhibited suffices to evoke a contemporary break both with the geometric language of Minimal Art and with optical art. Space is no longer coherence but coexistence of heterogeneities. A coexistence expressed as clearly in the entire range or canvasses presented, as in individual works. Jean Allemand, Shusaku Arakawa, Mino Argento, Juhana Blomstedt, Ronald Davis, Maxime Defert, Michel Gueranger, Patrick Ireland, Nicholas Krushenick, Barry Le Va, Finn Mickelborg, Philippe Morisson, Georges Noel and Frank Stella. To call this a revival of illusionism, is to forget that such a definition makes sense only when speaking in terms of representation, and not in situations of intensity and of force rather than of form. The simultaneous development of these studies on both sides of the Atlantic unknown even to the painters involved is the best evidence of their necessity as if the modernism of pictorial space was ceasing to be found in reference to flatness, to become an exploration of its own intensities.

In the words of Theodor Adorno: "All thought has its moment of universality anything well thought out will inevitably be thought of elsewhere by someone else".

=== Friuli Art and Monuments (FRIAM) ===
After the 1976 Friuli earthquake, Argento participated with a large group of American artists in donating a large collection of paintings, sculpture, and graphics as a gesture of international solidarity. The creation of the Friuli Art and Monuments (FRIAM)] committee promoted the collection of the works (Project Rebuild). This exhibit offers an important contribution toward the strengthening of Italian-American relations. The works, donated by over a hundred "American Artist to the Earthquake-struck towns of Friuli", are destined to cohabit in a permanent collection.

== Exhibitions ==
=== Solo ===
- 1965, Condotti Gallery, Rome, Italy. ("Umanità e Construttivismo di Mino Argento" by Giuseppe Fabbri, Bussola, (February, 1965))
- 1966, Realschule Gallery, Vaduz
- 1968, Galleria Astrolabio, Rome, Crane & Korchin Gallery, Manhasset, New York. ("Mino Argento" presentation by Marcello Venturol.
- 1974, October 28, Meet The Artist, Livingston-Learmonth Gallery, New York City
- 1977, Betty Parsons Gallery, New York City
- 1979, Betty Parsons Gallery, New York City
- 1987, J. P. Natkin Gallery, New York City
- 1988, April Sgro-Riddle Gallery, Los Angeles

=== Group ===
- 1965, 1966 Burckardt Gallery, Rome
- 1966, Porfirius Gallery, Rome
- 1968, Guglielmi Galleria, San Benedetto del Tronto, Italy
- 1967, 1968, 1969, 1970 Galeria Astrolabio, Rome
- 1975, 1976 Livingstone-Patricia Learmonth Gallery, New York City
- 1975, Group Exhibition, OK Harris Gallery Mino Argento and Ron Jackson (among others).
- 1977, December 20 – 31, Group Exhibition, Betty Parsons Gallery. Mino Argento, Calvert Coggeshall, Minoru Kawabata, Richard Tuttle, Ruth Vollmer, Robert Yasuda, Helène Aylon and Cleve Gray (among others).
- 1978, December 12 – 30, Group Exhibition, Betty Parsons Gallery. Ruth Vollmer, Mino Argento, Cleve Gray, Calvert Coggeshall, Richard Tuttle. (among others)
- 1978, 2–10 September, Group Exhibition 14, "7 Artistes Americains, 7 Artistes Europeans" Galerie Dorée Michel Gueranger and Maire de Deauville Anne d'Ornano. Casino de Deauville Hall and Galerie Dorée, Deauville, France. Jean Allemand, Shusaku Arakawa, Mino Argento, Juhana Blomstedt, Ronald Davis, Maxime Defert, Michel Gueranger, Patrick Ireland was the alter ego of Brian O'Doherty, Nicholas Krushenick, Barry Le Va, Finn Mickelborg, Philippe Morisson, Georges Noel, Frank Stella.
- 1979–80, December 18 – January 12, Group Exhibition, Betty Parsons Gallery. Mino Argento, Fanny Brennan, Richard Francisco, Richard Tuttle, Ruth Vollmer and Toko Shinoda (among others).
- 1979, Nardin Gallery, New York. (Group show of Contemporary Italian art). Lawrence Calcagno, Giò Pomodoro, Marcello Boccacci, Giorgio de Chirico, Marino Marini (sculptor), Mino Argento, Giorgio Morandi, Gustavo Foppiani. Twenty-eight artists are represented in 50 pieces of sculpture and painting)
- 1980, (Group Exhibition) "Arte Americana Contemporanea". Civici musei e gallerie di storia e arte. Udine, Italy
- 1980, Sneed Gallery, Rockford, Illinois
- 1980, December 9–12, (group show). Betty Parsons Gallery, New York. Mino Argento, Mark Lancaster (artist), Cleve Gray, Richard Tuttle. Minoru Kawabata. (among others).
- 1981, June 2–20, Betty Parsons Gallery, New York. Lee Hall, Calvert Coggeshall, Mino Argento. (among others)
- 1982 Ericson Gallery, New York City
- 1983, May 25 – June 18, "PAINTING", (group show). Betty Parsons Gallery, New York. Mino Argento, Jack Youngerman, David Budd, Calvert Coggeshall, Cleve Gray, Lee Hall, Minoru Kawabata, Richard Pousette-Dart, Leon Polk Smith, Hedda Sterne, Ed Zutrau and Sari Dienes (among others).
- 1983, July, "Group 2". Betty Parsons Gallery. Mino Argento, Kenzo Okada, Richard Francisco, Richard Tuttle, Fanny Brennan, (among others).

== List of works ==
=== Late 1950s and early 1960s ===
- La Tigre, (The Tiger) Oil e Collage su Tela, 60x 70 cm, 1968.
- Donna col Drappo Giallo, (Woman with Yellow Drape) 1968. Oil e Collage su Tela.
- Bagnanti, (Bathers) 1968. Oil e Collage su Tela.
- Sul Tappeto Giallo, (The Yellow Carpet) 1968. Oil e Collage su Tela.
- Ragazza Sul Letto, (Girl On Bed) 1968. Oil e Collage su Tela.
- Nudo,(Naked) 1968.
- Figura Giacente, (Lying Figure) 1968. Oil e Collage su Tela.
- Donna Accovacciata, (Woman Squatting) 1968. Private Collection
- Beauty Salon, (Beauty Salon) 1968. Oil e Collage su Tela.
- Donna e Macchina, (Woman and Machine) 1968.
- Donna e Frutta, (Woman and Fruit) 1968.
- Natura Morta, (Still life) 1968.
- Pupazza, (Puppet) 1968. Oil e Collage su Tela.
- Melanzane, (Eggplant) 1968.
- Il Foglio Bianco, (The white paper) 1968, Oil e Collage su Tela.
- Scena di Caccia, (Hunting Scenes) 1968.
- Toro al Mattatoio, (Toro at Slaughterhouse) 1968.
- La Monta, (The Mount) 1968.
- Piccolo Toro n.1, (Small Toro No.1) 1968.
- Piccolo Toro n.2, (Little Bull No .2) 1968.
- La grande Bestia, (The Great Beast) 1968. Oil e Collage su Tela.
- Paesaggio, (Landscape) 1968. Oil e Collage su Tela.

=== Late 1960s and early 1970s ===
- Senza titolo, 1973 (Untitled, 1973) Acrilico su tela, 127×127
- New York, 1973, Oil Acrylic and Gesso, Grids, Square Pencil Lines. White on White. 50" × 50"
- New York, 1973 #2 Oil, acrylic and gesso, three squares, pencil on canvas. White on White. 50" × 50"
- Untitled, 1976, Acrylic on Canvas, 48" × 60"
- "Untitled", 1977, 48" × 59".
- Untitled, 1977, Acrylic on Canvas, 35 1/2"X 50"
- "Untitled", 1977, 48"x 59".
- Untitled or (New York), 1977, Acrylic on Canvas, 25" × 70".
- "Untitled", 1977, Acrylic/Pencil on Canvas 30"x 30"
- "Untitled", 1978, 14"x 13.3/4"
- Untitled, 1978, 1,27 × 1,02 m.
- Labyrinthus II, 1978, 52"x 68" Oil on Acrylic on Canvas.
- "Untitled", 1979, 49"x 40", Oil on Acrylic on Canvas. Group show, small room. Betty Parsons Gallery New York. June 2–20, 1981.
- Fragments of a Paradox, 1979, Oil and Acrylic on Canvas, 57" × 48".
- Untitled, 1979, Oil and Acrylic on Canvas, 48"x 40".
- Janus Two Headed, 1979.
- Spectrum at 90o, 1979, Oil and Acrylic on Canvas, 49" x 40", group show December 18, 1979 to January, 1980
- Construction of Three Alternatives, 1979, Oil and Acrylic on Canvas, 57" × 48".

=== 1980s and afterward ===
- Untitled, 1986, Oil on canvas, 36" × 60".
- Inquietudine Geometria, 1987, Oil on Canvas, 52" × 47".
