= Calvert Coggeshall =

American painter

- Born: 1907; Whitesboro, New York, U.S.
- Died: 1 February 1990 (aged 83); Newcastle, Maine, U.S.
- Known for: Painter, Designer
- Movement: abstraction, early modernist-leaning landscape
- Awards: Guggenheim Foundation 1978

Calvert Coggeshall (1907-1990) was an abstract painter and a designer.

== Biography ==
Calvert Coggeshall, an abstract painter and a designer. His last New York exhibition was sponsored by the Rothko Foundation in 1987 at Artists Space, a nonprofit gallery on West Broadway. The paintings he showed were glowing, monochromatic canvases that echoed the colors of Maine skies, trees and earth.

From the early 1950s, Mr. Coggeshall exhibited regularly with the avant-garde Betty Parsons Gallery and later with its successor, the Jack Tilton Gallery. In 1978 a retrospective of his work was mounted by the Bowdoin College Museum of Art in Maine.

== Selected exhibitions ==
- 2024 Calvert Coggeshall: Chromatic Harmony, Lincoln Glenn Gallery, New York, New York February 29-April 13
- 2005 Paintings of the 1950s by Calvert Coggeshall, Amy Wolf Fine Art at Gallery Schlesinger, New York, NY, March 3-26
- 1991 Milton Avery: Watercolors and Calvert Coggeshall: The Late Works, Farnsworth Museum, Rockland, ME, August 23-October 27
- 1987 Recent Paintings: Calvert Coggeshall & Frederick Hammersley, Artist Space, New York, NY, May 24-June 27 (exhibition catalogue)
- 1982 Calvert Coggeshall: Paintings, (exhibited blue/gray paintings) Betty Parsons Gallery, New York, NY, November 20-December 8
- 1981 Highlights of the Permanent Collection, Whitney Museum of American Art, New York, NY, December
- 1978, Dec 12- Dec 30, Group Exhibition, Betty Parsons Gallery. Ruth Vollmer, Mino Argento, Cleve Gray, Calvert Coggeshall (among others)
- 1978 Calvert Coggeshall, Betty Parsons Gallery, New York, NY, January 3–21
- 1977, Dec 20-Dec 31, Group Exhibition, Betty Parsons Gallery. Mino Argento, Calvert Coggeshall, Minoru Kawabata, Richard Tuttle, Ruth Vollmer, Robert Yasuda, Helene Aylon and Cleve Gray (among others)
- 1977 Calvert Coggeshall: A Retrospective, Walker Art Gallery, Bowdoin College Museum of Art, Brunswick, ME, May 13-June 26 (exhibition catalogue)
- 1976 30th Anniversary Show: Congden, Coggeshall, Hofmann, Margo, Miles, Morgan, Murch, Newman, Ossorio, Pollock, Pousette-Dart, Reinhardt, Rothko, Ryan, Sekula, Stamos, Steinberg, Sterne, Still, Tomlin, Betty Parsons Gallery, New York, NY
- 1975 Group Show: Only Large Paintings, Calvert Coggeshall, Cleve Gray, Minoru Kawabata, Kenzo Okada, Eliza Moore, Patrick Ireland, William Taggart, Bob Yasuda, Yardley, Edward Zutrau, Betty Parsons Gallery, New York, NY
- 1974 Calvert Coggeshall, Betty Parsons Gallery, New York, NY, January 29-February 16
- 1972 Betty Parsons Gallery, New York, NY, April 18-May 6; May 9–27; May 30-June 16
- 1971 Calvert Coggeshall, Betty Parsons Gallery, New York, NY, November–December 4
- 1970 Calvert Coggeshall, Betty Parsons Gallery, New York, NY, April 21-May 9
- 1968 Calvert Coggeshall, Betty Parsons Gallery, New York, NY, December 10, 1968- January 4, 1969

Pittsburgh Plan for Art, Pittsburgh, PA. University of Colorado, Boulder, CO

- 1967 Calvert Coggeshall, Betty Parsons Gallery, New York, NY, May 1–20

Whitney Museum of American Art Painters Annual, Whitney Museum of American Art, New York, NY

- 1961 Paintings by Calvert Coggeshall, Sculptures by Guido Somaré, (Two person exhibition) Betty Parsons Gallery, New York, NY, April 3–22
- 1957 Calvert Coggeshall and E. Box, (Two person exhibition) Betty Parsons Gallery, New York, NY, October 14-November 2
- 1955 Paintings by Calvert Coggeshall and Sculptures by Pietro Lazzari, (Two person exhibition) Betty Parsons Gallery, New York, NY, February 21-March 12
- 1954 Abstract Painting and Sculpture in America, Museum of Modern Art, New York, NY

41st Annual Exhibition of Contemporary American Paintings, The Toledo Museum of Art, Toledo, OH, June- August (exhibition brochure) Group Exhibition, Dorothy G. Hales Gallery, New York, NY, October

- 1952 Betty Parsons Gallery, New York, NY, November 24-December 13
- 1951 Betty Parsons Gallery, New York, NY, December 17, 1951 – January 5, 1952

Annual Exhibition of Contemporary Painting in the United States, Los Angeles County Museum of Art, Los Angeles, CA, August

- 1949 Group Exhibition, Betty Parsons Gallery, New York, NY, October 10–29
- 1944 American: 1744-1944, The Brooklyn Museum of Art, Brooklyn, NY, June
- 1933 25th Annual Stockbridge Exhibition, Berkshire Playhouse, Stockbridge, MA, September 3–17

Exhibition of Paintings: Mrs. D. Percy Morgan Jr., George L. K. Morris, Calvert Coggeshall of New York, and Alexander Calder of Paris, Berkshire Museum, Pittsfield, August 12–25

- 1931 23rd Annual Stockbridge Exhibition. Berkshire Playhouse, Stockbridge, MA, August

== Public collections ==
- Albright–Knox Art Gallery, Buffalo, NY
- The Governor Nelson A. Rockefeller Empire State Plaza Art Collection, Albany, NY
