= Goulard =

Goulard is a surname. Notable people with the surname include:

- Antoine Goulard (born 1985), French football player
- François Goulard (born 1953), French politician
- Marc-Antoine Goulard (born 1964), French painter
- Sylvie Goulard (born 1964), French politician
- Thomas Goulard (1697–1784), French surgeon
