= Jean Marchand (disambiguation) =

Jean Marchand (1918–1988) was a French-Canadian public figure, trade unionist and politician.

Jean Marchand may also refer to:

- Jean-Baptiste Marchand (1863–1934), French diplomat
- Jean Omer Marchand (1873–1936), architect (including Peace Tower)
- Jean Marchand (painter) (1882–1940), French painter
- Jean Gabriel Marchand (1765–1851), French attorney and army officer
- Jean José Marchand (1920–2011), French critic of art, cinema and literature
- Jean Baptiste Louis DeCourtel Marchand, French officer
