= Ruth Vollmer =

American painter (1903–1982)

- Vollmer working on Obelisk, 1962 or 1963
- Born: Ruth Landshoff Vollmer; 1903; Munich
- Died: 1 January 1982 (aged 78)
- Known for: Painter, Sculpture
- Movement: abstract sculptor, minimalism

Ruth Landshoff Vollmer (1903–1982 New York City), was a German-born conceptual artist who lived and worked in the United States.

== Early life ==
Born in Munich in 1903 as Ruth Landshoff. Her father, Ludwig Landshoff, was a musicologist and conductor and her mother, Philippine Wiesengrund Landshoff, was an soprano opera singer. Her brother, Hermann Landshoff, became a photographer. Their family was Jewish, and their circle of friends in the 1920s included Gerhardt Hauptmann, Thomas Mann, Albert Einstein, and Paul Klee, among other writers, scientists, musicians and artists. At age 19 she moved from Bavaria to Berlin to work as an au pair. Ruth began to learn to draw in 1922. She maintained an interest in the visual arts, and took the advice of her father to draw every day. She also had many connections to the teachers and students at the Bauhaus, such as Erich Mendelssohn, who had designed their Berlin apartment. In 1930 she married the pediatrician Hermann Vollmer, whom she had met in Berlin. Ruth and Hermann moved from Germany (via Liverpool) to New York in 1935.

== Career ==
Ruth began work designing window displays for Bonwit Teller, Tiffany's, Lord & Taylor, and other department stores. Her displays experimented with wire, steel, and copper mesh to create figural forms. In 1943, Vollmer became a U.S. citizen. In 1944 she received a commission from the Museum of Modern Art for its fifteenth anniversary exhibition, "Art in Progress." Vollmer continued to work with wire mesh and exhibited her work Composition in Space at the Museum of Modern Art in their 1948 exhibition "Elements of Stage Design." In 1950, she was commissioned to create a mural for the lobby of 575 Madison, where she created a large wall relief that used wire rods and wire mesh to play with light, texture, and transparency. Vollmer visited Giacometti for a second time during the summer of 1951. During the 1950s she begins to works with clay as well. Additionally, in 1954 she began to teach at the Children's Art Center at the Fieldston School in Riverdale and continued to teach until the mid-sixties. In 1960, she participated in the New York University discussion series "Artists on Art" with her friend Robert Motherwell. The year 1960 proved to be a significant one for Ruth Vollmer: she had her first solo exhibition at Betty Parson's Section Eleven gallery space. Throughout the 1960s Vollmer continued to work with bronze and to show her work at the Betty Parsons Gallery. In 1963, she joined the American Abstract Artists (AAA) and showed her in their exhibitions from 1963 on. By 1970 Vollmer's practice had taken on a new dimension, exploring complex geometrical forms and mathematical concepts, particularly spirals and platonic solids. Sol LeWitt wrote a short essay on Vollmer's work for Studio International titled "Ruth Vollmer: Mathematical Forms." In 1971 Ruth Vollmer participated in the protest of the cancellation of the Hans Haacke at The Solomon R. Guggenheim exhibition by writing a letter to the museum's director, Thomas Messer. In 1976, she had a large one-person exhibition at the Neuberger Museum of Art.

Vollmer hosted artists such as Robert Smithson, Donald Judd, Sol LeWitt, Carl Andre, and Eva Hesse at "salons" in her apartment on Central Park West.

By 2022, Vollmer's work would be found in the following public collections: Kunstmuseum Winterthur, the Museum of Modern Art, the National Gallery of Art, the Whitney Museum of American Art, the Neuberger Museum of Art, the Worcester Art Museum, and the Rose Art Museum at Brandeis University.

In 1982, Ruth Vollmer died after a long battle with Alzheimer's. A majority of her personal art collection of over one hundred sculptures, paintings, and drawings was donated to MoMA. Her personal art collection included works by Carl Andre, Mel Bochner, Eva Hesse, Sol LeWitt, Ad Reinhardt, Frank Stella, Agnes Martin, and Chryssa.

== Exhibitions ==
- 1977, Group Exhibition, Betty Parsons Gallery. Mino Argento, Calvert Coggeshall, Minoru Kawabata, Richard Tuttle, Ruth Vollmer, Robert Yasuda, Helene Aylon and Cleve Gray (among others).
- 1978, Group Exhibition, Betty Parsons Gallery. Ruth Vollmer, Mino Argento, Cleve Gray, Calvert Coggeshall (among others)
- 1979–80, Group Exhibition, Betty Parsons Gallery. Mino Argento, Fanny Brennan, Richard Francisco, Richard Tuttle, Ruth Vollmer and Toko Shinoda (among others)
- 2025, Solo Exhibition, Tilton Gallery.
