= Natkin =

Natkin is a surname. Notable people with the surname include:

- Brian Natkin (born 1978), American football coach and former player
- Robert Natkin (1930–2010), American born abstract painter
