= Thibaut de Reimpré =

French painter (1949–2023)

- Born: 1949
- Died: 7 February 2023 (aged 73–74)
- Occupation: Painter

Thibaut de Reimpré (1949 – 7 February 2023) was a French contemporary painter.

== Biography ==
Born in Paris in 1949, he attended the 'Beaux-Arts' in Paris and worked, in particular, in the 'Atelier Yankel' from 1968 to 1971. He worked either in Paris or in the Sarthe region, mostly with acrylic paint (though he has also worked with china ink), his style was abstract. Thibaut de Reimpré belongs to the second generation of the French School of abstract painting after the second World War. His work fits, more precisely, in the Lyrical Abstraction school of thought, which is also promoted by painters such as Michelle Destarac and Pierre Célice.

His work can be seen frequently, both in public events and in art galleries, on the occasion of the three or four personal exhibits each year, within or outside France, as well as in multi-author events or in international shows (no less than 165 since 1970).

De Reimpré died in Le Mans on 7 February 2023.

== Bibliography ==
(1) Emmanuel Daydé and Eric Devlin (2000) 'Thibaut de Reimpré', Préface de Françoise Chaserant, Texts in French and in English, Fragments Editions, 79 pp., ISBN 2-912964-17-2.

(2) Philippe Piguet (2004) 'Reimpré', Préface de Didier Decoin (de l'Académie Goncourt), Texts in French and in English, Fragments Editions, 192 pp., ISBN 2-912964-47-4.

(3) Bruno Lajoinie (2009) 'Reimpré 2006-2009', Texts in French and German, Fragments International, 50 pp., ISBN 978-2-917160-10-7.
