= Albert Bitran =

French painter and sculptor (1931-2018)

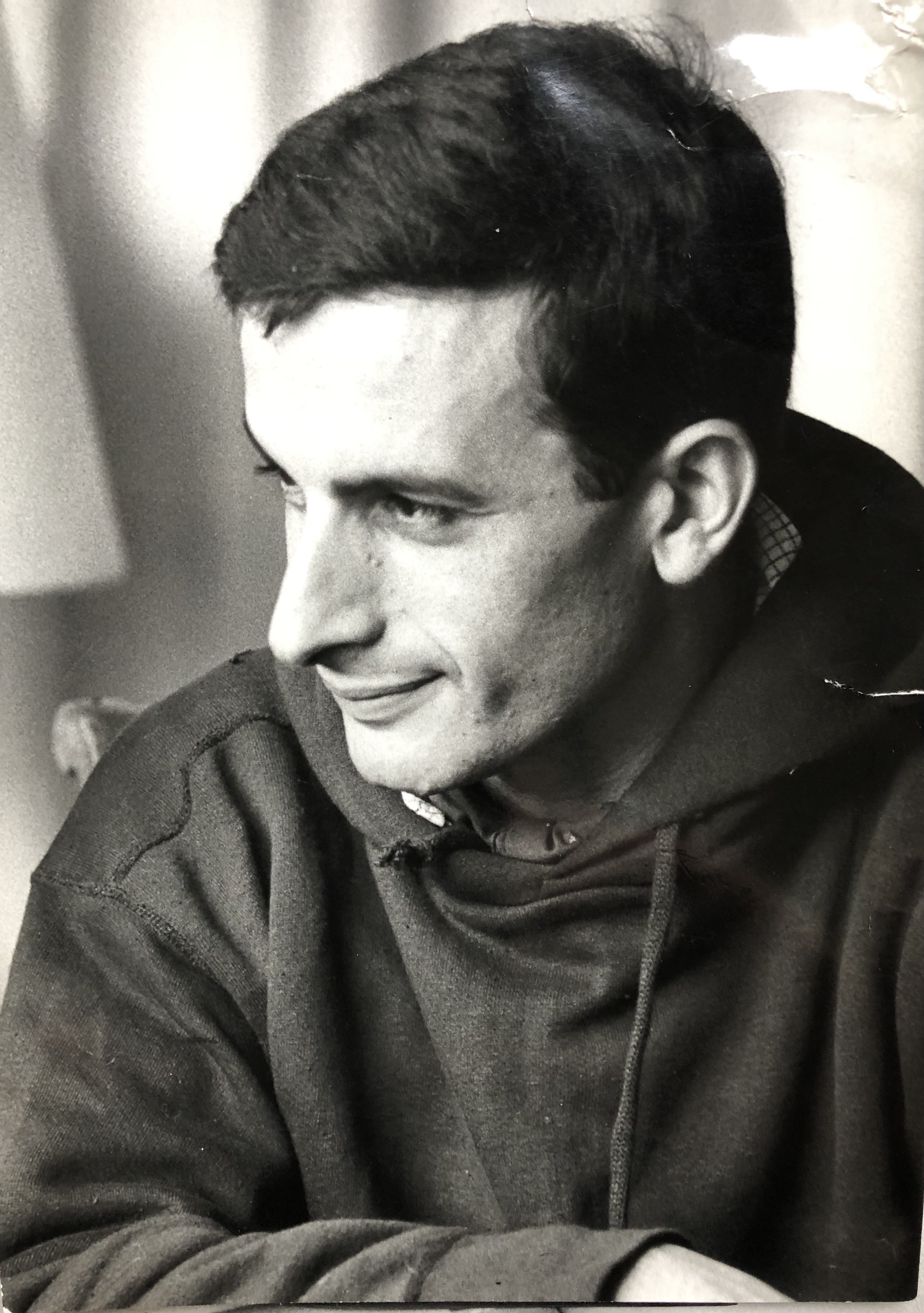
Albert Bitran, Paris 1963

Albert Bitran (1931 in Istanbul, Turkey – 9 November 2018 in Paris, France) was a French painter, engraver and sculptor.

== Biography ==
Albert Bitran was born in 1931, in a Jewish Sephardic family, in Istanbul, Turkey. After his studies at the French Collège Saint Michel, having both diplomas in French and Turkish, he was admitted to the Ecole Spéciale d’Architecture, in Paris.

In 1948, at seventeen, he arrives in Montparnasse, knowing already that he wants to become a painter, not an architect. Leaving the school after 8 months, he moves into a studio at the American pavillon of the Cité Universitaire, where he joins the circle of expatriated artists who had come to Paris for inspiration: Ellsworth Kelly and Jack Youngerman from the U.S., many South Americans, Ricardo Porro from Cuba, Jesús Rafael Soto from Venezuela, Serge Poliakoff from Russia, Pablo Palazuelo from Spain, and two young artists : Georges Koskas from Tunisia and Horia Damian from Romania, who had a most decisive influence on his debut as a painter.

Bitran begins to explore a strict, geometric language. Jean-Robert Arnaud, who just opened his gallery in Saint Germain des Prés the Avant-Garde “place to be", organizes in 1951, Bitran's first solo exhibition; he also publishes one of his graphic work in the first Cimaise magazine, and in 1954, exposes one of his painting on the walls of the Theatre of Babylone, for the opening of Samuel Beckett’s Waiting for Godot. Henri-Pierre Roché, prestigious art collector, future author of Jules et Jim, friend of Marcel Duchamp and Brancusi, makes Bitran a generous offer: he will lease him a large room Boulevard Arago, providing him with the materials for painting in exchange of some works. There, Bitran experiments geometrical almost optical drawings on paper with coloured pencils. Denise René organizes an exhibition in her famous gallery and Henry-Pierre Roché writes the preface of the catalogue. Yet, Bitran starts searching for a more personal expression: informal, gestual, architectural, the lyrical abstraction movement with which he would be associated for the next sixty years. The Birth of a Landscape is an impressive example of his new freedom. This large collage of 1956 will be shown in the exhibition L’Envolée Lyrique, at the Musée du Luxembourg, Paris, in 2006 and is now in the Gandur Fondation for Art, in Geneva.

In 1958, Albert Bitran becomes French citizen, marries Claude Ledoux, moves to a studio, rue des Plantes, Paris and buys an old farm in Rigny-le-Ferron, Aube, where he sets up a ceramic studio. In Paris, he joins the painters Marfaing, Doucet, Gillet, Corneille, Bengt Lindström, Tabuchi, at the Galerie Ariel, where Jean Pollack will show Bitran's work during the next forty years. Bitran also works on graphics: etching and lithography, first at Mourlot, then at Bellini and Leblanc's printing houses. In 1961, for the first time in Scandinavia, Boerge Birch presents a personal exhibition of Bitran in his Copenhagen gallery. Northern countries, that he visits often, are now showing a great interest in his work. In Holland, he exhibits regularly, first at Nova Spectra in The Hague, then, from 1971 on, in Amsterdam at the Gallery Martin de Boer. His major themes in the sixties are Landscapes, The Studio, Inside-Outside, Laterals, and Verticals. In 1968, he moves to rue Notre-Dame-des-Champs, in Montparnasse, where he will work and live until 2000.

"Doubles", an analytic interrogation of his painting becomes his major theme in the seventies. The French philosopher, Claude Lefort, writes the essay «Bitran, or the Question of the Eye » published by SMI in 1975 and in 1978 by Gallimard. As a conclusion to this pictural adventure, "Sextuor", a sequence of six paintings in a closed cycle, is exhibited according to a plan designed by architect Ricardo Porro, in museums and galleries in Norway, Denmark, Holland, France, and Austria,

In 1979 and 1980, Bitran chairs the seminar of the Salzburg Summer Academy, and Manès Sperber prefaces the catalogue of his exhibition at the Traklhauss. In the early eighties, Bitran sets up a studio in the Lot, where he experiments new techniques on paper and cardboard mixing oil, ink, fusain and pastel... He creates the "Grandes Formes" (Great Forms) that Patrick Bongers chooses for his first exhibition at Galerie Louis Carré, Paris in 1987; these works will also be exhibited at the Boisserée Gallery in Köln, at Art Point in Tokyo, at Louis Stern in Los Angeles ….

During Bitran’s retrospective in the Campredon Museum at l’Isle-sur-la-Sorgue in 1991, an interview with art historian, Jean Paris, was filmed and later published in Coloquio Artes, review of the Gulbenkian’s Foundation in Lisbon. Revisiting souvenirs from his childhood and his many travels in Turkey, Bitran’s new theme comes directly from the Mediterranean world. Fascinated by the form of the Arcades, he gives in his painting the « inside-outside » impression of the form without being figurative. For his large paintings and his sculptures, more space is needed. In 2000, Bitran builds his home and his studios on the ruins of an old cinema in Montrouge, south of Paris.

With his new theme Les Noirs,( The Blacks) he goes right into « what he always thought of as the major color : black ». - from Affinités en noir major, catalogue of the exhibition in 2017, galerie Convergences, Paris.

In the following years, Bitran participates in more than fifty exhibitions worldwide among others: Kunst des 20 Jahnunderts, Galerie Schilling, Köln, 2001. Lecciones de tinieblas, Academia 13, Mexico City, 2007. 20 Modern Turkish Artists of the XX century, SantralIstanbul, 2011, Modernités Plurielles, Centre Pompidou, 2013, and holds personal exhibitions in galleries and museum in France, Turkey and in England at the London’s Grosvenor Gallery, in 2010 and 2011.

Albert Bitran had the distinction of "Officier des Arts et Lettres". He died 9 November 2018, aged 87.

(To visualize works of Albert Bitran online refer to the section "External links - Bank of images of ADAGP" below).

== See also ==
- Lyrical Abstraction
- Tachisme
- Art Informel
- School of Paris

== Public collections ==
Works of Albert Bitran are represented in the following public collections:

- Musée d'Art Moderne, Centre Georges Pompidou, Paris.
- Musée d'Art Moderne de la Ville de Paris, Paris.
- Fonds National d'Art Contemporain, Paris.
- Henie Onstad Kunstsenter, Oslo/Norway.
- Lunds Konsthall, Lund, Sweden.
- Fine Arts Museums of San Francisco, San Francisco, U.S.A.
- Rhodes Island School of Design Museum, New York, U.S.A.
- University Museum, Berkeley, U.S.A.
- Hammer Museum, Grunwald Center for the Graphic Arts, Los Angeles, U.S.A.
- ISTANBUL MODERN, Contemporary Art Museum, Istanbul, Turkey.
- İstanbul State Art and Sculpture Museum, Istanbul Resim ve Heykel Müzesi, Turkey.
- Musée des Beaux-Arts de Lyon, Donation Jacqueline Delubac, Lyon, France.
- Musée d'Arts de Nantes, Donation Gildas Fardel, Nantes, France.
- Statens Museum for Kunst, Copenhagen, Denmark.
- Ny Carlsbergfondet, Copenhagen, Denmark.
- Randers Kunstmuseum, Randers, Denmark.
- Contemporary Art Society, London, UK.
- Gemeente Museum, Art Museum in the Hague, Netherlands.
- Centraal Museum, Utrech, Netherlands.
- Cuban State Collection, Havana, Cuba.
- Landhuis Bloemhof, Curaçao.
- Gentofte Rådhus, Copenhagen, Denmark.
- Foundation Roi Baudoin, Thomas Neirynck Collection, Brussels, Belgium.
- Art Foundation Jean-Claude Gandur, Geneva, Switzerland.
- Museum der 20-Jahrunderts, Vienna, Austria.
- Museum der Moderne, Rupertinum, Salzburg, Austria.
- F.R.A.C. Midi-Pyrénées, Toulouse, France.
- Les Abattoirs, musée de Toulouse, France.
- Musée Municipal de Saint Dié, France.
- Musée des Beaux-Arts H. Rigaud, Perpignan, France.

== Recent exhibitions ==
2008:

- Galerie Nev, Ankara
- Hands, Institut Français, Istanbul

2010:

- Obliques, Grosvenor Gallery, Londres

2015:

- Albert Bitran, huiles sur papier, galerie Convergences, Paris

2017:

- Affinities in major black, Convergences gallery and Gratadou-Intuiti gallery, Paris

2019:

- Albert Bitran, galerie Bertrand Trocmez, Clermont-Ferrand
