= Wells Street Gallery =

Former art gallery in Chicago, Illinois

The Wells Street Gallery (1957–1959) was one of Chicago's vanguard galleries of the late 1950s.

== History ==
In the summer of 1957, a group of artists led by painter Robert Natkin opened a co-operative gallery at an old storefront at 1359 North Wells Street, Chicago. The gallery was tagged "an avant-garde exhibition place filled with the most advanced abstractions in town," by the Chicago Sunday Tribune.

The Wells Street Gallery played a major role in granting young artists like sculptor John Chamberlain and painter Robert Natkin their first one-person exhibitions at a time when too few galleries in Chicago, or elsewhere for that matter, where interested in the work of abstract artists. The gallery closed after only two years, but made a historic contribution in advancing abstract art in Chicago.

== Artists ==
Artist associated with the Wells Street Gallery include: Richard Bogart, Ernest Dieringer, Judith Dolnick, Robert Natkin, Ronald Slowinski, Naomi Tatum, Gerald van de Wiele, Donald Vlack, sculptor John Chamberlain, and photographer Aaron Siskind.

== Sources ==
- The Wells Street Gallery Revisited: Now and Then at ArtCat
