= Chelsea Art Museum =

Former art museum in the United States

Coordinates: 40°44′52.7″N 74°0′26.3″W

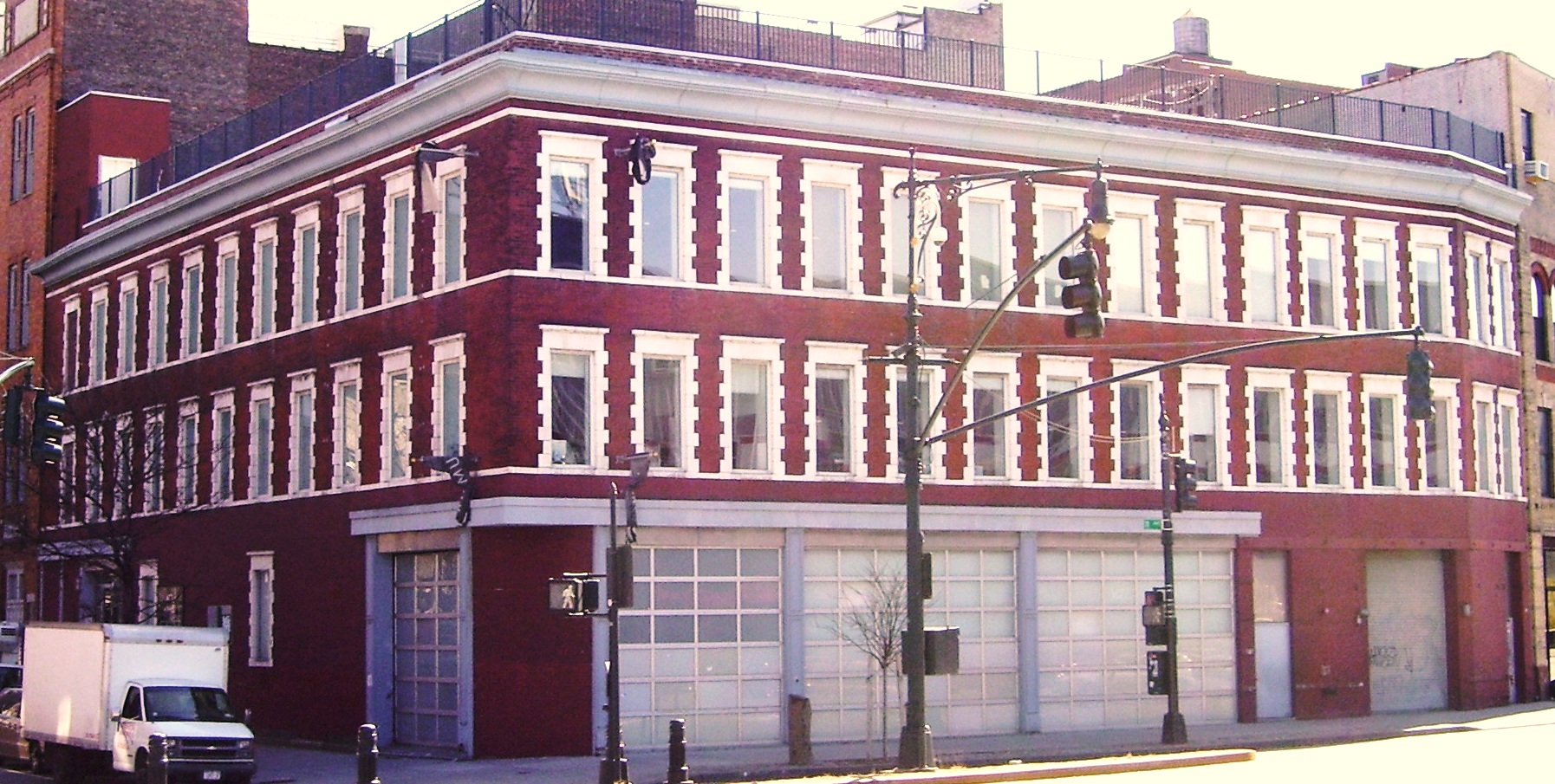
Chelsea Art Museum

The Chelsea Art Museum (CAM) was a contemporary art museum located at 556 West 22nd Street on the corner of Eleventh Avenue in the Chelsea neighborhood of Manhattan, New York City. The museum focused on post-war European art.

The museum was in a 30,000 sq ft (2,800 m^{2}) renovated historic building, which was also the location of the Miotte Foundation, which was committed to archiving and protecting the works of Jean Miotte and providing new scholarship and research on L'Art Informel. Rotating selections of Miotte's work were shown at the museum on a regular basis, as are selections from the museum permanent collection, which contains 500 works, including paintings, etchings, sculpture, ceramics, tapestries, and works on paper, primarily focusing on L'Art Informel and Abstract Expressionist artists from Europe and the United States, including Pol Bury, Mimmo Rotella, and Jean-Paul Riopelle.

The museum and shop closed by December 31, 2011. The closing followed lengthy financial difficulties and the possible loss of its charter, which eventually led to the sale of the building.
