= Stephen Mueller =

American painter

- Born: September 24, 1947; Norfolk, Virginia
- Died: September 16, 2011 (aged 63); New York City, New York
- Education: University of Texas, Austin; Bennington College
- Style: Color field painting; Lyrical abstraction

Stephen Mueller (September 24, 1947 – September 16, 2011) was an American painter whose color field and Lyrical Abstraction canvases took a turn towards pop.

== Life and career ==
Mueller was born in Norfolk, Virginia, and grew up in Dallas, Texas. His mother worked as an interior decorator, while his father was an Army Corps of Engineers mechanical engineer.

He earned a bachelor's degree in painting from the University of Texas, Austin in 1969, and a Master of Arts at Bennington College in 1971, where the influence of Clement Greenberg and the color field school ran high. Although Mueller used that style as a stepping off point while incorporating many different spiritual symbols and motifs, so as not to remain entirely abstract.

In 1970, while still at Bennington, Mueller had his first solo exhibition at the Richard Feigen Gallery in New York.

Mueller and Ronnie Cutrone organized the silkscreen paintings for Andy Warhol's "Shadows" series for the artist's exhibition at the Dia Art Foundation in 1979.

As stated in the Brooklyn Rail regarding his painting style: "Islamic art, Indian miniature painting, Mexican ceramics, Tantra painting, the color theory of Philipp Otto Runge, the spiritual aura found in German Romanticism, music, textile design, and a profound knowledge of Eastern philosophy all contributed to shaping his vision. After abandoning gestural abstraction in the late 1980s, and with it a focus on earth tones, Stephen turned to color wholeheartedly. By the early 1990s, his palette was saturated with bright hues. It is one of the artist’s striking achievements that his work, despite all spectral indulgence, never seems flat."

In 2003, a retrospective of his work was held at the Joslyn Art Museum in Omaha, Nebraska.

Mueller's work is held in the collections of the Brooklyn Museum, Whitney Museum of American Art, Denver Art Museum and the Museum of Fine Arts, Houston.

== Death ==
Mueller died at the age of 63 on September 16, 2011, in New York City. He was survived by his mother, Frances Mueller, and sister, Debra Pendleton.
