= Jacques Soisson =

French painter (1928–2012)

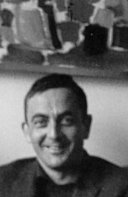
Family photo of Jacques Soisson in 1965

Jacques Soisson (February 1928, in Paris – 2012) was a French artist as well as a child and adolescent psychotherapist. He painted in the manner of Art Brut.

== Life ==
Soisson studied at the École des Beaux-Arts de Toulouse and continued at the École des Beaux-arts de Montpellier.

Commencing in 1966 to work as a child and adolescent psychotherapist he made some attempts to art therapy. This turned out so well that from then on he originated the "Atelier d’art-thérapie". All painted works by the patients during this therapy were collected and donated to the Museum of Hospice St. Roch in Issoudun. Further he collaborated with the "Institut Édouard Claparède de Neuilly-sur-Seine"

One year later, in 1969 Soisson joined the Société d’Art Brut, having been founded by Jean Dubuffet. It ensued an acquaintance between both.

In 1978 Jacques Soisson gave up his profession and dedicated to painting, animated by Dubuffet. He lived and painted in Paris.

== Public Collection ==
- Boca Raton Museum of Art, Florida

== Publications by Soisson ==
- „Dare dare: un livre d'art ou le coeur a l'ouvrage“, Acayoulge, 1990
- „As-tu connu Machu Picchu?“, Nidra Poller and Jacques Soisson, Messidor/La Farandole, 1984
- „Le cœur au repos“, Jacques Berne and Jacques Soisson, Chez Michel Bon, imprimeur taille-doucier, 1980
- „Le sacré corps“, ed. Joseph Delteil, B. Grasset, 1976, p. 202 ff.
