= Pierre Fichet =

French painter (1927–2007)

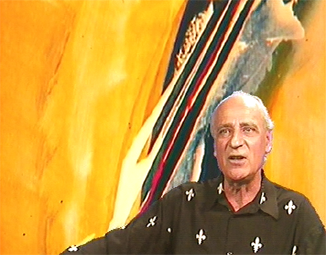
- Pierre Fichet (Screenshot from a video "l'Encyclopédie audiovisuelle de l'art contemporain")
- Born: 10 August 1927; Paris, France
- Died: 8 January 2007 (aged 79); Paris, France
- Movement: Lyrical Abstraction

Pierre Fichet (10 August 1927 – 8 January 2007) was a French painter.

== Biography ==
Pierre Fichet belongs to the second generation of post second world war abstract painters and is a Lyrical Abstraction artist. His first abstract work was in 1947.

In 1952: first exhibition at la maison des Beaux-arts of Paris.

In 1954: first exhibition of an abstract work at galerie Arnaud in Paris.

In 1959, becomes an observer member of GIAP groupe international d'architecture prospective created by Michel Ragon with Yona Friedman, Paul Maymont, Georges Patrix and Nicolas Schöffer.

His funeral was held on 13 January 2007 at Saint-Léonard's church in Croissy-sur-Seine (Yvelines, France).
