= Alice Baber =

American abstract expressionist painter (1928 - 1982)

- Born: August 22, 1928; Charleston, Illinois
- Died: October 2, 1982 (aged 54); New York City, New York
- Education: Lindenwood College for Women, Missouri; Indiana University; École des Beaux-Arts, Paris
- Known for: Abstract painting
- Movement: Abstract expressionism, Lyrical abstraction

Alice Baber (August 22, 1928 – October 2, 1982) was an American abstract expressionist painter who worked in oil and watercolor. She was educated in the United States and in the 1950s and 1960s she studied and lived in Paris. She also traveled around the world. Baber, a feminist, organized exhibits of women artists' work.

== Early life ==
Baber was born in Charleston, Illinois. She grew up in Kansas, Illinois and Miami, Florida. Her family traveled south to Florida in the winters at a doctor's suggestion because of Alice's poor health, starting around the age of two. She was interested in becoming an artist from an early age. Baber remembers that around age five she decided she would either be a "poet or painter." At age eight, she was formally studying drawing and by age twelve became "so advanced she was enrolled in a college-level class."

When World War II, broke out, the yearly trips Florida ended; around that time, Baber was in her early teens. Baber remembers traveling to Florida and staying in a tent: "that had a certain kind of romance. And later I always felt a bit like a nomad".

== Education ==
Baber chose to study art when she attended Lindenwood College for Women in Missouri, where she spent two years before transferring to Indiana University. At Indiana University, she studied under the figurative expressionist, Alton Pickens. She received her Master of Arts in 1951 and then began to travel through Europe. She studied briefly at the École des Beaux-Arts and lived in Paris in the late 1950s and 1960s. During her travels in Europe, she made a living through her writing and was the art editor of McCall's.

== Work ==
Baber began her career working primarily in oils, but began experimenting with watercolor paints in the 1950s. Her experimentation with watercolor initiated a shift in style for Baber as she went from painting still lifes to creating more abstracted works. Her abstract works focus on color and form with shapes such as the circle being a common motif. Baber was well known for her use of light and color holding several exhibitions devoted to these themes.

In 1958, Baber had her first solo show in New York at March Gallery where she was a member. In that same year, she was also granted a studio residency at the Yaddo Art Colony. During this time, she began to develop her unique explorations of color that derive from the "infinite range of possibilities" for exploring color and light within the form of the circle. She told Brian Jones that she was looking for a "way to get the light moving across the whole thing" in Battle of the Oranges. This creative inspiration became fundamental to her artistic approach.

In 1959, she showed paintings throughout Europe, including the first "Jeune Biennale" of the American Cultural Center in Paris, France. Her early life as a "nomad" may have influenced her somewhat: she began to divide her years by living in France for six months every year for a period of time.

In 1975, Baber curated the exhibition "Color, Light and Image". An international exhibition of 125 women artists in celebration of the United Nations' International Women's Year. The show was held at the Women's Interart Center in New York City.

From 1976 to 1978, Baber traveled to 13 Latin American countries with the U.S. State Department, exhibiting her work and lecturing on art. In 1979, Baber was an artist-in-residence at the Tamarind Institute print workshop.

Numerous museums around the world and major galleries in the United States own her works, including the Guggenheim, Whitney, Metropolitan, the Museum of Modern Art, and the Georgia Museum of Art. She is also widely collected by private, corporate and university collections. Her art reflects, but defies "various stylistic trends" and is "imbued with undulating, sensuous movement, and...pure, translucent colors."

== Personal life ==
Alice Baber married Paul Jenkins, a painter, June 16, 1964 in New Haven, Connecticut. They divorced in 1968, but remained friends and supported each others artistic careers.

Even though in her later life she experienced great "pain and debilitation" from cancer, she continued to paint. Baber died of cancer in 1982. She was interred in Fairview Cemetery in Edgar County, Illinois.
