= John Seery =

American lyrical abstraction artist

- East, 1973, synthetic polymer on canvas, National Gallery of Australia
- Born: 1941 (age 84–85); Maspeth, New York, U.S.
- Education: Art Academy of Cincinnati and Ohio State University
- Known for: Painting
- Movement: Lyrical abstraction

John Seery (born 1941) is an American artist who is associated with the lyrical abstraction movement. He was born in Maspeth, New York, was raised in Flushing, Queens and as a teen, moved to Cincinnati, Ohio.

== Biography ==
He studied at Miami University in Oxford, Ohio, from 1959 to 1963 then continued his studies at the Art Academy of Cincinnati and Ohio State University in Columbus. He was on the faculty of the Massachusetts College of Art and Design in Boston and was a visiting lecturer at Harvard University during the 1980s. He currently lives in Florida.

== Public collections ==
Whitney Museum of American Art, New York

The Guggenheim Museum, New York, NY

National Gallery of Australia, Canberra, Australia

Smithsonian Institution, Washington D.C.

Contemporary Arts Museum, Houston, Texas

Museum of Fine Arts, Boston, MA

Fogg Art Museum, Harvard University, Cambridge, MA

Norton Simon Museum, Pasadena, CA

Museum Of Contemporary Art, Sydney, Australia

Santa Barbara Museum of Art, Santa Barbara, CA

Museum of Art Fort Lauderdale, FL

Baltimore Museum of Art, Baltimore

Brooklyn Museum of Art, Brooklyn, NY

Hirshhorn Museum & Sculpture Garden, Washington D.C.

Madison Museum of Contemporary Art, Madison, Wisconsin

Picker Art Gallery, Colgate University, Hamilton, NY

Toledo Museum of Art, Toledo, Ohio

Honolulu Academy of Art, Honolulu, HI

Speed Art Museum, Louisville, Kentucky

Museum of Art, Rhode Island School of Design, Providence, RI

Contemporary Arts Center, Cincinnati, Ohio

Julius Baer Art Collection, Switzerland

== Sources ==
- Brandl, Mark Staff, John Seery, Richterswil, Kunsthaus Richterswil, 1998.
- Galerie Andre Emmerich and Peter Schjeldahl, John Seery: Paintings, Zurich March, 1975.
- The Madison Art Center, John Seery: Paintings, Madison, Wisconsin Madison Art Center, 1974.
