= Carol Haerer =

American artist (1933-2002)

- Carol Haerer in 1974
- Born: January 23, 1933; Salina, Kansas, USA
- Died: July 20, 2002 (aged 69); Bennington, Vermont, USA
- Education: University of Nebraska; Sorbonne, Paris; University of California, Berkeley
- Known for: Lyrical abstraction, Minimalism
- Style: Abstract painting
- Spouse: Phillip Wofford
- Awards: Guggenheim Fellowship

Carol Haerer (1933-2002) was an American artist known for abstract painting in the vein of Minimalism and Lyrical abstraction.

== Career ==
Haerer is best known for her White Painting series of works. Her work was included in the Lyrical Abstraction exhibition at the Aldrich Museum of Contemporary Art, Ridgefield, Connecticut. In 1990, the Rothko Foundation at Artists Space sponsored a three-person exhibition of Ed Clark, Carol Haerer and Ted Kanshare, which was reviewed by Arts Magazine. Her large-scale paintings were often stretched on supports with rounded corners, creating a sense of objecthood with luminous surface quality.

== Education ==
Haerer graduated from the University of Nebraska in 1954, and went on receive a Fulbright Fellowship to attend the Sorbonne in Paris for two years. She then attended the University of California, Berkeley, where she received a Masters of Fine Arts.

== Awards and honors ==
Haerer received a Guggenheim Fellowship for Creative Art in 1988.

== Collections ==
Her work is included in the collections of the Solomon R. Guggenheim Museum, the Whitney Museum of American Art, the Brooklyn Museum, the Sheldon Museum of Art, the Spencer Museum of Art, the Museum of Nebraska Art, the Hood Museum, the Zimmerli Art Museum, and other collections.
