= Natvar Bhavsar =

Indian artist

- Born: 1934 (age 91–92); Gothava, Mehsana, Gujarat India
- Occupation: Indian-American artist
- Spouse: Janet Brosious Bhavsar
- Children: 2

Natvar Bhavsar (born 1934) is an Indian-American artist, based in Soho, New York City for nearly 50 years, noted as an abstract expressionist and color field artist.

Bhavsar's paintings appear in more than 800 private and public collections, including the collections of the Boston Museum of Fine Arts, the Metropolitan Museum of Art in New York, the Philadelphia Museum of Art, the Solomon R. Guggenheim Museum in New York, the Museum of Contemporary Art in Sydney, Australia, the Library of Congress, NYU's Grey Art Gallery, and the Australian National Gallery. In addition, his works have been purchased and displayed by corporations such as the American Express Company, AT&T, Chase Manhattan Bank, and NBC. Bhavsar and his works have been the subject of books, including: Natvar Bhavsar: The Sound of Color, (Robert C. Morgan, 2002) and Natvar Bhavsar: Painting and the Reality of Color, (Irving Sandler, 1999).

== Early life and education ==
Bhavsar is a Gujarati. Born 1934 in village Gothava, near Visnagar in Gujarat, India to a wealthy family, he studied at the Seth CN College of Fine Arts in Ahmedabad. He also graduated in English literature from Gujarat University. Bhavsar earned a Master of Fine Arts degree from the University of Pennsylvania School of Design in 1965, and received a Rockefeller grant.

== Career ==
Bhavsar attained prominence as an artist in India by age 19, working primarily in the Cubist vein. After moving to New York City, he became influenced by the freedom of abstract painting. His style evolved into abstract expressionism and color field painting, and his works often feature a hazy object (absent of direct lines or geometric shapes) in the center of a solid canvas, that projects an astral-like mass of color.

Employing some techniques from the Indian tradition of sand painting, Bhavsar paints in an improvisational manner, "soaking the canvas with acrylic-based liquid binders that absorb and hold the fine pigment powder. He applies the base using a sifting technique with a screen, during which layers of fine, concentrated pigment are sprinkled and drizzled over the canvas (or paper), which is laid out on the floor so that the artist can walk around the painting and work on it from all sides."

Bhavsar primarily shows his work at Aicon, New York, and the ACP Viviane Ehrli Gallery in Zurich, Switzerland, along with Pundole Art Gallery in Bombay, India. He has been exhibiting his works in one-man shows since 1970. In 2007, the Jane Voorhees Zimmerli Art Museum at Rutgers University sponsored an exhibition of about 50 of Bhavsar's works. It was the first United States university to hold a one-man show of a South Asian artist.

Earlier in his career, Bhavsar was a John D. Rockefeller III Fund Fellow (1965 –1966), a Guggenheim Foundation Fellow (1975 – 1976), and an instructor of art at the University of Rhode Island (1967 – 1969). In 1980 and 1983, he participated in Executive Seminars at the Aspen Institute and, more recently, participated as a Cultural Leader at the World Economic Forums in Davos, Switzerland (2000) and New York (2002). Throughout his career, Bhavsar has associated with a number of acclaimed artists, most prominently, Mark Rothko (1903 – 1970) and Barnett Newman (1905 – 1970).

Bhasvar has been included in the Asian American Arts Centre's artasiamerica digital archive.

In 2011, a documentary on his life and works, The Poetics of Color: Natvar Bhavsar, a Painter's Journey was made by Sundaram Tagore.

== Personal life ==
Bhavsar married American artist and photographer Janet Brosious Bhavsar in 1978, and they have twin sons. The Bhavsars met in art class in the early 1960s, and she drove him to New York City on his first visit in 1963 to look at Picasso paintings at the Museum of Modern Art.
