= Lesley Dill =

American artist (born 1950)

- Born: 1950 (age 75–76); Bronxville, New York
- Education: Maryland Institute College of Art, Smith College, Trinity College
- Known for: Sculpture, performance, printmaking, drawing, photography
- Spouse(s): Ed Robbins, Documentary Filmmaker
- Website: http://www.lesleydill.net

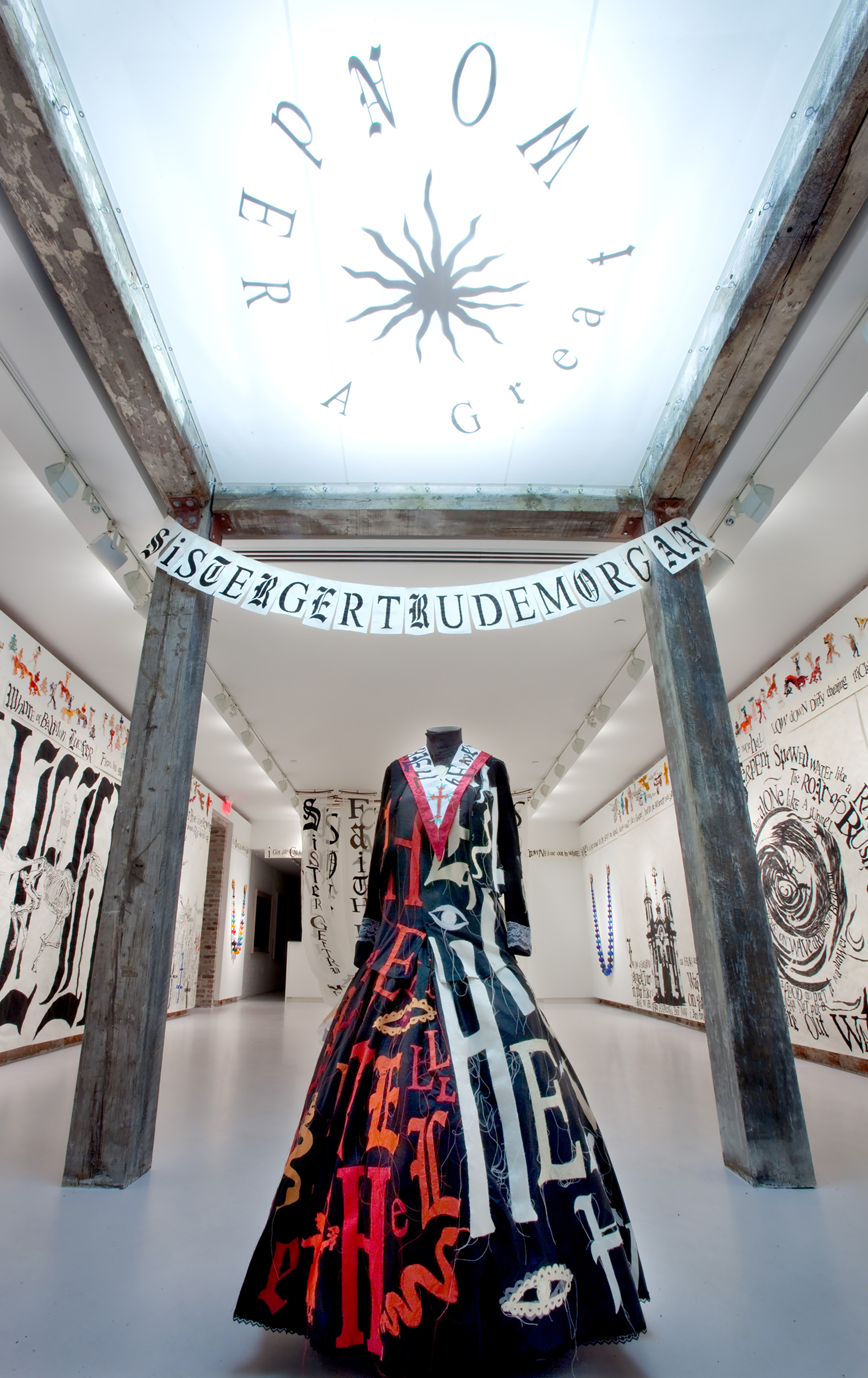
Installation of Hell Hell Hell / Heaven Heaven Heaven, Arthur Roger Gallery, New Orleans, Louisiana, 2010

Voices in My Head, 1997, charcoal and thread on a gelatin silver print, Honolulu Museum of Art

Lesley Dill (born 1950) is an American contemporary artist. Her work, using a wide variety of media including sculpture, print, performance art, music, and others, explores the power of language and the mystical nature of the psyche. Dill currently lives and works in Brooklyn, New York.

== Early life and education ==
Dill was born in 1950 to high school teachers, and was raised in Maine. The natural landscape in Maine served as an inspiration for her work and its impact can be found in several pieces, including the installation piece SHIMMER (2005-2006).

Dill received a Bachelor of Arts in English in 1972 from Trinity College and went on to receive a Master of Arts in Teaching from Smith College in 1974. After a period of teaching in public and private schools, Dill went on to receive a Master of Fine Arts from the Maryland Institute College of Art in 1980. It wasn't until her late twenties that Dill began to consider a career as an artist. Growing up, she was an avid reader, and her fascination with language can be found in her art. Before pursuing a career in art, Dill's exposure to art was mostly limited to the crafts practiced by various family members, including ceramics, linocut printing, rug making, and weaving. As a result, some craft practices can be found in her art.

In 1985, Dill married filmmaker Ed Robbins, and their life together has played a role in shaping her work, especially in the places they traveled together.

== Artistic career and style ==
In the eighties, Dill began working in sculpture, creating both wood and cast bronze sculptures. A gift of Emily Dickinson poems in 1990 proved to be important to the development of Dill's style, as she began to work the text of poems directly into her pieces, something that she has continued throughout her career with the works of a variety of poets, including Emily Dickinson, Pablo Neruda, and Salvador Espiru.

Another major influence on Dill's work is the time she spent living and working in India with her husband. There she was impacted by the landscape, weather, architecture, clothing, and other sensory aspects of her environment. Her decision to experiment with painting text on human models and photographing these "living sculptures" was inspired by watching Indian women creating henna designs.

Her forays into photography transitioned into working in performance art, with pieces like Speaking Dress (1994). She explores the relationship of text and language to a variety of media, often employing a diverse range of materials. Voices in My Head from 1997, in the collection of the Honolulu Museum of Art, demonstrates how the artist combines photography with text, embellishing the work with charcoal and thread. Dill has described language as being "...the touchstone, the pivot point of all my work." Her work crosses traditional boundaries between artistic disciplines and includes printmaking, drawing, sculpture, photography and performance art, often used in tandem with one another.

=== Community projects and performances ===
In the 1990s, Dill began a project with Graphicstudio/USF in Tampa, Florida, through which she created several large-scale pieces which were hung as billboards around the city. The billboards reached a broader audience, including many who may not visit traditional museum or gallery settings.

In addition to her sculpture and works on paper, Dill is known for her performance work and public projects. In 2000, the Southeastern Center for Contemporary Art, Winston-Salem presented Lesley Dill, Tongues on Fire: Visions and Ecstasy, the artist's first community-based project, which included an exhibition of new work inspired by over 700 community stories about spirituality and mysticism, four outside billboards, and a performance done in collaboration with the Emmanuel Baptist Church Spiritual Choir.

In 2003, Dill's performance project I Heard a Voice, done in collaboration with Tom Morgan and the Ars Nova Singers, was presented at the Evergreen Cultural Centre (Vancouver). It included the world premiere of the performance piece I Dismantle.

=== Music ===
In 2008, Dill conceived and directed a full-scale opera, Divide Light, based on the language of Emily Dickinson. It premiered in August 2008 at the Montalvo Arts Center, Saratoga, California. The opera was commissioned by Montalvo Arts Center and was supported in part by grants from the Rockefeller Foundation Multi Arts Production Fund, the William and Flora Hewlett Foundation, the David and Lucile Packard Foundation and the National Endowment for the Arts. A film of the opera, Divide Light, premiered in New York City at the Anthology Film Archives in April 2009. The music was done in collaboration with composer Richard Marriott.

In 2012, Dill began collaborating with Pamela Ordoñez on Drunk with the Starry Void, a multimedia musical performance. It premiered in the summer of 2015 at the McNay Museum in San Antonio.

In April 2018, Divide Light was re-performed at Dixon Place in New York City by the New Camerata Opera.

== Exhibitions ==
Dill's work has been widely exhibited and the subject of numerous solo shows across the United States at both commercial galleries as well as museums such as the Neuberger Museum of Art (Purchase, NY), Mississippi Museum of Art (Jackson, MS), Queens Museum of Art and the Dorsky Museum (SUNY New Paltz, New Paltz, NY). Her work can be found in the collections of the Albright Knox Art Gallery, Buffalo; Brooklyn Museum; Cleveland Museum of Art; High Museum (Atlanta, GA); Kemper Museum, Kansas City; Metropolitan Museum of Art; MoMA; Whitney Museum of American Art; and Yale University Art Gallery, among many others.

In 2002–2003, Dill's first museum retrospective, Lesley Dill: A Ten Year Survey, organized by the Samuel Dorsky Museum of Art at SUNY New Paltz, traveled to the CU Art Galleries, University of Colorado, Boulder; Chicago Cultural Center, Chicago; Contemporary Museum, Honolulu; Scottsdale Center for Contemporary Art; and the National Museum of Women in the Arts, Washington, DC.

In 2007, Tremendous World, an exhibition at the Neuberger Museum in Purchase, NY, featured three new large-scale works, two measuring 20 x 65 feet, some of Dill's largest works to date.

In 2009, a major retrospective, I Heard A Voice: The Art of Lesley Dill, was on view at the Hunter Museum of American Art. The retrospective was organized by the Hunter Museum of American Art, Chattanooga, TN; and George Adams Gallery. The show traveled through 2010 to Smith College Museum of Art, Northampton, MA; Museum of Fine Arts, St. Petersburg, FL; Palmer Museum of Art, Penn State University, University Park, PA; and Columbia Museum of Art, Columbia, SC.

In 2010, Hell Hell Hell/Heaven Heaven Heaven: Encountering Sister Gertrude Morgan & Revelation was on view at the Arthur Roger Gallery in New Orleans, LA. Dill has continued to maintain an active exhibiting relationship with the Arthur Roger Gallery since 1993, with solo exhibitions in 1993, 1994, 1997, 2000, 2004, 2007, 2010 and 2014.

In 2012, Faith & the Devil opened at George Adams Gallery in New York City. The show is currently traveling and has been exhibited at the Fine Arts Center Gallery at the University of Arkansas, Fayetteville, AR in 2014, the Clay Center for the Arts and Sciences, Charleston, WV (2014), and the Weatherspoon Art Museum at The University of North Carolina at Greensboro, NC (2014). The show continues to travel around the United States.

In October 2014, Beautiful Dirt opened at Arthur Roger Gallery, New Orleans, LA.

In 2015, Lesley Dill: Performance as Art opened at McNay Art Museum in San Antonio, TX.

In 2015, Lesley Dill: Large Photography opened at 315 Gallery in New York, NY.

In 2016, Myth and Menagerie: Lesley Dill premiered Dill's new work at the Gershman Y Gallery in Philadelphia, PA.

In April 2016, Durbin Gallery showed Lesley Dill & Emily Dickinson: Poetry and Art at Birmingham-Southern College, Birmingham, AL.

In March 2016, Dill was the Artist-in-Residence at Fullerton College Art Gallery in Fullerton, CA.

In 2018, WILDERNESS: Words are where what I catch is me, opened at Nohra Haime Gallery in New York City, marking Dill's first major exhibition in New York since 2014. The show then traveled to the Mattatuck Museum, Waterbury, CT.

From May 29, 2021 - August 22, 2021, the Figge Art Museum in Davenport, IA became the first venue to open Wilderness: Light Sizzles Around Me, an expansive exhibition inspired by 16 historical and fictional figures (1591-1980) all of whom sought peace, justice, or a path to visionary self-expression in tumultuous times. Wilderness continues to travel to many other venues: Montgomery Museum of Fine Arts | Montgomery, Alabama October 9, 2021 – January 2, 2022; Bates College Museum of Art | Lewiston, Maine January 28 – March 26, 2022; Canterbury Shaker Village | Canterbury, New Hampshire May 28 – September 11, 2022; Munson Williams Proctor Arts Institute | Utica, New York October 22, 2022 – January 29, 2023; Bernard A. Zuckerman Museum of Art | Kennesaw State University | Kennesaw, Georgia March 4 – May 6, 2023; Ulrich Museum of Art | Wichita State University | Wichita, Kansas August 24 – December 2, 2023.

== Awards and grants ==
Dill has been the recipient of awards and grants from such institutions as the Joan Mitchell Foundation, New York Foundation for the Arts, National Endowment for the Arts and the Rockefeller Foundation. She was also the recipient of the Anonymous Was A Woman award in 2008, a Center for Book Arts Honoree in 2010, a SGC International Lifetime Achievement in Printmaking Award in 2013, and the Falk Visiting Artist Residency at the University of North Carolina at Greensboro in 2014–15. She was named a Fellow of the John Simon Guggenheim Memorial Foundation in 2017. In 2019, Dill received both the Smith College Museum of Art Centennial award and the Emily Dickinson Museum's Tell It Slant Award. Lesley received the Smithsonian Artist Research Fellowship Award, an innovative research based residency from 2023 - 2024.
