= Roland Dorcely =

Haitian painter (1930–2017)

Roland Dorcely (18 November 1930 – 2017) was a Haitian painter. Born in Port-au-Prince, Dorcely exhibited his works in the United States, France, Canada, and Colombia. His works are displayed in Paris' Centre national des arts plastiques and in New York City's Museum of Modern Art. Dorcely died in 2017.

== Sources ==
- Schutt-Ainé, Patricia (1994). Haiti: A Basic Reference Book. Miami, Florida: Librairie Au Service de la Culture. p. 111. ISBN 978-0-9638599-0-7.
