= Jean Miotte =

French painter (1926–2016)

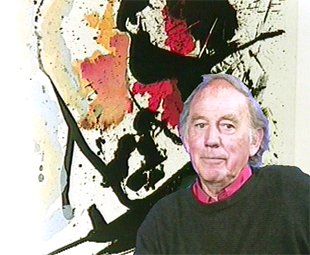
Portrait of Jean Miotte (1995)

Jean Miotte (1926 – March 1, 2016) was a French abstract painter, in the style known as L'Art Informel. His work was preserved and studied by the Miotte Foundation and is in the collections of museums including: MoMA and the Guggenheim in New York, Musée d'Art Moderne de Paris and Haus der Kunst in Munich.

== Recent exhibitions ==
- 2000: Museum am Ostwall, Dortmund, Allemagne
- 2009: Retrospective, Exposition Galerie Daniel Besseiche, Paris
- 2021: Diane de Polignac Gallery, Paris (3 juin - 3 juillet)
