= Marc-Antoine Goulard =

French painter

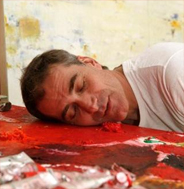
- Born: 30 January 1964; Neuilly-sur-Seine, France
- Education: Berklee College of Music of Boston
- Known for: Painting
- Movement: Lyrical Abstraction

== Biography ==
Marc-Antoine Goulard is a French artist, born in 1964 in Neuilly-sur-Seine, who defends abstract lyric painting. He began his career as a classical musician then as a painter. He lives in, London since 2010

== Musician ==
Marc-Antoine Goulard learned the piano from the age of 4 years old then start to play the flute at 9 years old. He studied the flute and composition at the conservatory of music of Rueil-Malmaison then graduated with honor at the conservatory in Paris to become a concertist.

Marc-Antoine arrived in America in 1985 to take up the saxophone and continued his studies in jazz composition at the prestigious Berklee college of Music . However while music, with its foundation of tone and composition, provided him the means for expression, it would ultimately be in painting that Goulard found his creative voice.

== Painter Designer ==
Marc-Antoine Goulard discovered painting in May 1988 and received a residency in 2009 at the Josef Albers and Anni Foundation in Bethany, Connecticut. Art critic Nicholas Fox Weber, biographer and director of an art foundation, he recognized the quality of Marc-Antoine Goulard's visual work and published in September 2008 the catalogue " raisonné " of his paintings.

The social platform Saatchi Online exhibit the creative envinroment and portfolio of Marc-Antoine Goulard.

Among many galleries Marc-Antoine Goulard's paintings are shown at the following ones: Gallery William Turner in Los Angeles, galerie Brissot (rue de Verneuil) Paris, gallery Ruth Morpeth in New Jersey, gallery Cynthia Drennon in Santa Fe and the gallery Cynthia Corbett in London - Bruno Framont - Connecticut, USA. Gallery " 174 Faubourg " Paris, France, Josephine Clavel projects in London

His monotypes are printed and published with the Editions Jacques Berville in Arpaillargues.

He has been chosen as the French artist for the cultural year France - Russia 2010.

Marc-Antoine Goulard has also been the patron in 2005 for the association "Tous les enfants ont des droits" where his paintings have been disseminate at the Sénat (France).

== See also ==
- History of painting
- Lyrical Abstraction
- Abstract expressionism

Designer
