= Robert Natkin =

American abstract painter (1930–2010)

- Born: November 7, 1930; Chicago, Illinois, U.S.
- Died: April 20, 2010 (aged 79); Danbury, Connecticut, U.S.
- Known for: Abstract expressionism; color field painting; lyrical abstraction
- Spouse: Judith Dolnick
- Website: robertnatkin.com

Robert Natkin (November 7, 1930 – April 20, 2010) was an American abstract painter whose work is associated with abstract expressionism, color field painting, and Lyrical Abstraction.

He was born in Chicago, and from the early 1950s he created several series of paintings (Field Mouse, Apollo paintings, Hitchcock, Bern, Intimate Lightening) many of which are represented in the permanent collections of major museums as well as in corporate and private collections. His work has been exhibited in leading galleries in the U.S., Europe, and Japan. The San Francisco Museum of Art held a retrospective of Natkin's work in 1969. Critic Peter Fuller has written extensively about Natkin's work and produced a documentary on the artist (with the BBC) which explored the relationship between art and psychoanalysis.

He lived with his wife, painter Judith Dolnick, in Connecticut. Natkin enjoyed painting as well as singing gospel according to the Akron Art Institute, Akron, Ohio.

== Selected collections ==
- The Albright-Knox Art Gallery, Buffalo, New York
- The Art Institute of Chicago, Chicago, Illinois
- The Boca Raton Museum of Art, Boca Raton, Florida
- The Brooklyn Museum of Art, New York City
- The Butler Institute of American Art, Youngstown, Ohio
- Centre Pompidou, Paris, France
- The Columbus Museum of Art, Columbus, Ohio
- Fogg Art Museum, Harvard University Art Museums, Cambridge, Massachusetts
- The Hirshhorn Museum and Sculpture Garden, Smithsonian Institution, Washington, DC
- Krannert Art Museum, University of Illinois, Champaign-Urbana, Illinois
- The Queens Museum, Queens, New York
- Los Angeles County Museum of Art, Los Angeles, California
- The Metropolitan Museum of Art, New York
- The Mint Museum of Art, Charlotte, North Carolina
- Pennsylvania State University, University Park
- Rhode Island School of Design, Providence, Rhode Island
- Carnegie Institute, Pittsburgh
- The Museum of Fine Arts, Houston
- The Museum of Modern Art, New York City
- National Gallery of Australia, Canberra, Australia
- New Britain Museum of American Art, New Britain, Connecticut
- Oklahoma Art Center, Oklahoma City
- San Diego Museum of Art, San Diego
- The Solomon R. Guggenheim Museum, New York
- Wadsworth Atheneum, Hartford, Connecticut
- Whitney Museum of American Art, New York
- Worcester Art Museum, Worcester, Massachusetts

== See also ==
- Wells Street Gallery
