= Jean José Marchand =

French critic of art, cinema and literature (1920–2011)

- Born: 4 August 1920; Paris, France
- Died: 8 March 2011 (aged 90)
- Occupation: Critic

Jean José Marchand (4 August 1920 – 8 March 2011) was a French critic of art, cinema and literature. From the late 1960s he made many documentary TV films of writers, philosophers and artists.

== Life ==
Jean José Marchand was born on 14 August 1920 in Paris. He volunteered at the start of World War II (1939–45). After the Fall of France in 1940 he worked at the Bibliothèque nationale de France and contributed to the journals Poésie 40, Confluences and Les Cahiers du Sud. After the Liberation of France in 1944 Roger Grenier helped him get a position as art critic for Combat. Through this he met Pascal Pia, Albert Camus and Maurice Nadeau. As a Gaullist, in 1947 he joined the Rally of the French People (RPF: Rassemblement du peuple français).

Marchand wrote the preface to the catalog of L'Imaginaire, a group show at the Galerie Luxembourg in December 1947 in which he characterised the group's work as "lyrical abstraction". He connected poets such as Henri Michaux to André Breton's Surrealism, writing "In truth Michaux is the true Surrealist, the man who abolishes words and gives us, in their pure state, the subterranean products of the mind." Marchand was among the critics who contributed to the debates about postwar Surrealism and the École de Paris. In mid-1947 he wrote a review in Combat of an exhibition of English artists at the Galerie de France in which he said the work had no particularly "English" qualities, and was similar to the work of the École de Paris. He wrote,

In 1947 painters around the whole world respond with a certain number of solutions, always the same, to a certain given situation. As the democracy of merchants and technicians progressively destroys local customs, national particularities and even the ancestral traditions of the diverse Christian faiths, the vital problems posed by the world become simpler and are formulated with such clarity that artists simultaneously find identical responses to them despite their separation in space.

In the 1950s Marchand continued to write as a critic for various journals. In the early 1960s Marchand became head of the Office de Radiodiffusion Télévision Française film department. In 1968, fifty years after the death of Guillaume Apollinaire, with the support of Pierre Sabbagh, Marchand and Dominique de Roux developed a film of witnesses of Apollinaire's period. In the years that followed he filmed more than 150 personalities of contemporary cultural life for his television series "Les Archives du XXe siècle", ranging from Raymond Abellio to Jean Wiener. In 2006 Marchand himself was filmed by Benoît Bourreau and interviewed by Guillaume Louet in the documentary Mieux partagés que nous ne sommes.

Marchand spent several years researching the life and work of Charlemagne-Ischir Defontenay, the author of the highly original science fiction work Star, ou Psi de Cassiopèe : Histoire merveilleuse de l'un des mondes de l'espace (1854), and wrote the preface to the 1972 paperback edition. Marchand was an obsessive book collector, and in 1999 entrusted almost 40,000 volumes to the Institut de la Mémoire de l’Edition (IMEC). At the time of his death the IMEC had made little progress in indexing the collection. Jean José Marchand died on 8 March 2011 in Paris at the age of 90.

== Publications ==
Publications by Jean José Marchand include:

- Jean-José Marchand (1955), La vie aux frontières du poème : essais de prospection poétique, illustrations by Hans Hartung, Paris: les Éditions de Minuit, p. 52
- Galerie Louis Carré & Cie. Paris; Jacques Lassaigne; Jean-José Marchand (1957), Borès, peintures, Paris: L. Carré (Impr. la Ruche), p. 39
- Jean-José Marchand (1970), Sur "Mon cœur mis à nu" de Baudelaire, Paris: l'Herne, p. 307
- Jean-José Marchan; Henry de Montherlant (1980), Jean-José Marchand interroge Montherlant, Paris: J.-M. Place, p. 100
- Jean-José Marchand (1982), La Vie aux frontières du poème, Paris, Genève: Slatkine, p. 68
- Jean-José Marchand (2001), Le rêveur, Monaco, Paris: du Rocher, p. 216
- Jean-José Marchand; Paul Morand (2001), Entretiens, Paris: la Table ronde, p. 143
- Jean-José Marchand (2010), La leçon du chat : rapsodie, Paris: Éd. de la Différence, p. 77
- Jean-José Marchand (2011), Ecrits, 1941–2011 extraits choisis, Paris: Les Amis des archives du XXe siècle, p. 31
- Jean-José Marchand (2012), Guillaume Louet (ed.), Écrits critiques 1941–2011, vol. 1–5, Paris: Éd. du Félin : C. Paulhan, impr.

The Bibliothèque nationale de France also has records of 33 items such as video cassettes where he was artistic producer, 15 where he was interviewer, 5 where he was editor, 5 where he wrote the preface, 2 where he was a contributor 3 films where he was director, and 7 where he was otherwise involved.

== Sources ==
- Adamson, Natalie (2017-07-05), "Painting, Politics and the Struggle for the ?ole de Paris, 1944?964 ", Taylor & Francis, ISBN 978-1-351-55519-7
- Bujot, Suzanne, "Jean José Marchand, l'archiviste mal archivé", jeanjosemarchand.fr (in French)
- Cornell, Kenneth (1964), "On the Difficulty of a Label", Yale French Studies (31: Surrealism), Yale University Press: 138–144, doi:10.2307/2929736, JSTOR 2929736
- Jean-José Marchand (1920–2011) (in French), BnF: Bibliotheque nationale de France
- Ledos, Jean-Jacques (2013-12-01), Dictionnaire historique de télévision: de ABC à Zworykin, Editions L'Harmattan, ISBN 978-2-336-33146-1
- Paulhan, Claire (31 March 2011), "Jean José Marchand, critique, documentariste", Le Monde (in French)
- Zielonka, Anthony (September 1986), "Defontenay's Star as Poetic and Philosophical Science Fiction", French Forum, 11 (3), University of Pennsylvania Press: 317–333, JSTOR 40551297
