= Michel Gueranger =

French painter

Michel Guérange
- Born: November 14, 1941 (age 84); Houilles Carrières-sur-Seine, France
- Known for: Painter, Graphic designer, photographer

Michel Guéranger (born November 14, 1941, in Houilles Carrières-sur-Seine) is a painter, graphic designer and photographer. After graduating from the 'Ecole Nationale Supérieure des Arts Appliqués et des Métiers d'Art', he devoted himself entirely to his passion for art. At age 25, a series of oil paintings on paper, signed under the name Michel Gérard, constituted his first exhibition, which traveled from Paris to London. 1975 – Guéranger founds the group SPACE with Jean Allemand and Maxime Defert. Through an innovative discourse, these forerunners of the 3D image explored the problematics of space: physics of shapes, art of tension, space-time hypergeometry and vibratory masses of light.

== Collections ==
His public collections includes:

- National Contemporary Art Acquisitions Fonds national d’art contemporain
- Museum of Modern Art, City of Paris. France
- Georges Pompidou Center. Paris. France
- Dunkirk Museum of Modern Art. Dunkirk. France
- Museum of Saint-Maur. France
- Copenhagen Handelsbankens Kunstforening Collection. Denmark
