= Stanley Boxer =

American artist, printmaker (1926–2000)

- Died: Pittsfield, Massachusetts
- Education: Art Students League of New York
- Known for: Abstract painting
- Awards: Guggenheim fellowship

Stanley Boxer (1926-May 8, 2000) was an American artist best known for thickly painted abstract works of art. He was also an accomplished sculptor and printmaker. He received awards from the Guggenheim Fellowship and the National Endowment for the Arts.

== Career ==
Boxer was born in New York City, and began his formal education after World War II, when he left the Navy and studied at the Art Students League of New York. He drew, painted, made prints, and sculpted. His work was recognized by art critic Clement Greenberg, who categorized him as a color field painter, a designation which Boxer rejected. Art critic Grace Glueck wrote "Never part of a movement or trend, though obviously steeped in the language of Modernism, the abstract painter Stanley Boxer was a superb manipulator of surfaces, intensely bonding texture and color."

Boxer offered an explanation of his philosophy and working process:

In the manufacture of my art, I use anything and everything which gets the job done without any sentiment or sancity as to medium. Then, too, I have deliberately made a practice of being "visionless" ... this is, I go where my preceding art takes me, and never try to redirect the future as to what my art should look like. This is a general credo and foundation for everything I have ever done and stands firm in its solidity as this is written.

In 1953 Boxer had his first solo exhibition of paintings in New York City, and showed regularly thereafter until his death. His paintings and sculpture were represented in New York City during the late 1960s through 1974 by the Tibor de Nagy Gallery, then by the André Emmerich Gallery from 1975 until 1993, and finally by Salander-O'Reilly Galleries until its demise in 2007 .

Richard Waller, director of the University of Richmond's Harnett Museum of Art, describes his evolution as an artist:

You can see the shift from working with figurative imagery in the 1940s and early '50s to abstraction in the late '50s. The abstraction in the late '60s and '70s was more derived from color-field issues. In the 1980s, Boxer really hit his stride in larger works with lots of thick paint and splashes of color. He sold a lot, and his success in the art world in the 1980s gave him the freedom to do what he wanted to do most.

== Museums ==
One-man museum exhibitions were held at the Rose Art Museum and the Butler Institute of American Art. Boxer’s work is included in the permanent collections of numerous museums, including the Metropolitan Museum of Art, the Tate Gallery, the Museum of Modern Art and the Whitney Museum of American Art in New York, the Hirshhorn Museum in Washington, and the Boston Museum of Fine Art.

== Honors ==
Boxer received a Guggenheim Fellowship in 1975 and a National Endowment for the Arts Visual Artists Fellowship Grant in 1989. In 1993 he was elected as a full member to the National Academy of Design.

== Death ==
Boxer died May 8, 2000, in Pittsfield, Massachusetts. He was 73 years old. According to Boxer's wife of 49 years, the artist Joyce Weinstein, Boxer created more than 7,000 drawings, paintings, and sculptures, about 700 of which were part of his estate at the time of his death.
