= Cleve Gray =

American Abstract expressionist painter

- Born: Cleve Ginsberg; September 22, 1918; New York City, New York, U.S.
- Died: December 8, 2004 (aged 86); Hartford, Connecticut, U.S.
- Movement: Abstract expressionism
- Website: clevegray.com

Cleve Gray (September 22, 1918 – December 8, 2004) was an American abstract expressionist painter, who was also associated with color field painting and lyrical abstraction.

== Early life and education ==
Gray was born Cleve Ginsberg: the family changed their name to Gray in 1936. Gray attended the Ethical Culture School in New York City (1924–1932). From the age of 11 until the age of 14 he had his first formal art training with Antonia Nell, who had been a student of George Bellows. From 15 to 18 he attended the Phillips Academy in Andover, Massachusetts; where he studied painting with Bartlett Hayes and won the Samuel F. B. Morse Prize for most promising art student.

In 1940 he graduated from Princeton University with a degree in art and archeology. He was a member of Phi Beta Kappa. At Princeton he studied painting with James C. Davis and Asian art with George Rowley, under whose supervision he wrote his thesis on Yuan dynasty landscape painting.

== Work ==
After graduating in 1941, Gray moved to Tucson, Arizona. He exhibited his landscape paintings and still lifes at the Alfred Messer Studio Gallery. In 1942 he returned to New York and joined the United States Army. During World War II, he served in the Signal Intelligence Service in Britain, France, and Germany, where he rose to the rank of sergeant. After the Liberation of Paris he was the first American G.I. to greet Pablo Picasso and Gertrude Stein. He began informal art training with the French artists André Lhote and Jacques Villon, continuing his art studies in Paris after the war.

Gray returned to the United States in 1946. In 1949 he moved to the house his parents had owned on a 94-acre (380,000 m^{2}) property in Warren, Connecticut, and lived there for the rest of his life. He married the writer and critic Francine du Plessix on April 23, 1957. They worked in separate studios in two outbuildings with a driveway in between.

Gray was featured in many exhibitions throughout his career, from the early days in Tucson through to postwar Paris and New York, including in 2002 at the Berry-Hill Gallery in New York City. His paintings are held in the collections of numerous prominent museums and institutions. In 2009 the art critic Karen Wilkin curated a posthumous retrospective of his work at the Boca Raton Museum of Art, Florida, and other posthumous exhibitions have been held.

== Death ==
His wife of 47 years, Francine du Plessix Gray, reported that he died of a "massive subdural hematoma suffered after he fell on ice and hit his head."

== Selected collections and exhibitions ==
- Addison Gallery of American Art, Andover, Massachusetts
- Buffalo AKG Art Museum, Buffalo, New York
- Boca Raton Museum of Art, Boca Raton, Florida
- Brooklyn Museum, New York City, New York
- Cathedral of St. John the Divine Art Gallery, New York City, New York
- Columbus Museum of Art, Columbus, Ohio
- National Gallery of Art, Washington, D.C.
- Honolulu Museum of Art, Honolulu, Hawaii
- Jewish Museum, New York City, New York
- Krannert Art Museum, Champaign, Illinois
- Metropolitan Museum of Art, New York City, New York
- Rhode Island School of Design Museum, Providence, Rhode Island
- Museum of Fine Arts, Boston, Massachusetts
- Museum of Fine Arts, Houston, Texas
- Museum of Modern Art, New York City, New York
- Neuberger Museum of Art, Purchase, New York
- New Britain Museum of American Art, New Britain, Connecticut
- The Newark Museum of Art, Newark, New Jersey
- Oklahoma City Museum of Art, Oklahoma City, Oklahoma
- The Phillips Collection, Washington, D.C.
- Princeton University Art Museum, Princeton, New Jersey
- Sheldon Museum of Art, Lincoln, Nebraska
- Smithsonian American Art Museum, Washington, D.C.
- The Wadsworth Atheneum, Hartford, Connecticut
- Whitney Museum of American Art, New York City
- Willard Gibbs Research Laboratory, Yale University, New Haven, Connecticut
- Williams College Museum of Art, Williamstown, Massachusetts
- Yale University Art Gallery, New Haven, Connecticut

== Publications ==
- Contributing editor for Art in America, from 1960
- Editor, David Smith by David Smith, Holt, Rinehart & Winston (1968)
- Editor, John Marin by John Marin, Holt, Rinehart & Winston (1970)
- Editor, Hans Richter by Hans Richter, Holt, Rinehart & Winston (1971)
