= Bykert Gallery =

Coordinates: 40.763555°N 73.97537°W

Bykert Gallery was a contemporary art gallery in New York City between 1966 and 1975, run by Klaus Kertess (1940 - 2016) and Jeff Byers who had been classmates at Yale College, class of 1958. The gallery originally was located at 15 West West 57th Street in Manhattan, (in the same space as the defunct Green Gallery that closed in 1965); it later moved to East 81st Street between Madison and Fifth Avenues. Among the artists who were represented at Bykert are Brice Marden, Chuck Close, Ralph Humphrey, David Novros, and Dorothea Rockburne. Artists who showed there with solo exhibitions or in group shows include Jared Bark, Bill Bollinger, Robert Duran, Richard Van Buren, Peter Gourfain, Alan Saret, Michael Goldberg, Ronnie Landfield, Gary Stephan, Deborah Remington, Bob Neuwirth, Paul Mogensen, Judy Rifka, Arleen Schloss, Alan Uglow, Barry Le Va, Thornton Willis, and Joe Zucker.

During the 1960s Lynda Benglis began her career by working for the Bykert Gallery as a secretary before launching her own successful artistic career; and during the 1970s Mary Boone began her career by working for the Bykert Gallery as a secretary before opening her own successful gallery.
