= Bergen Assembly 2016 =

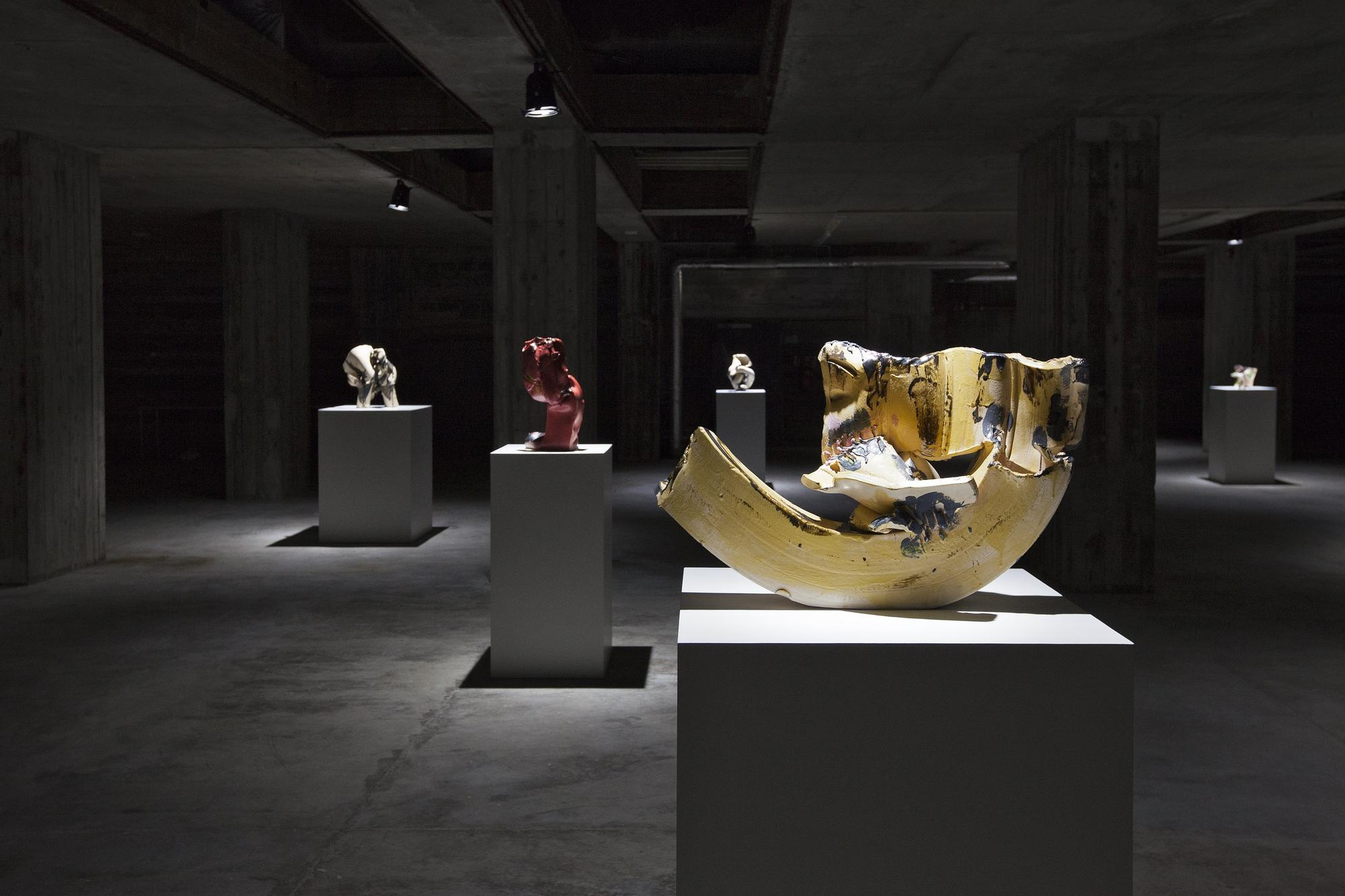
- Genre: Contemporary art
- Begins: 6 February 2016
- Ends: 18 December 2016
- Frequency: Triennial
- Location: Bergen
- Country: Norway
- Previous event: Bergen Assembly 2013
- Next event: Bergen Assembly 2019
- Organizer: Tarek Atoui; PRAXES; freethought

Bergen Assembly 2016 was the second edition of Bergen Assembly, held in Bergen, Norway, throughout 2016. It was convened by artist and composer Tarek Atoui, the collective freethought, and the Berlin-based collaborative platform PRAXES.

The edition emphasized sound-based practices, collective research, and performative formats, foregrounding sensory and participatory modes of engagement over conventional exhibition models.

Atoui’s project included the exhibition Infinite Ear and the performance series WITHIN, staged in the decommissioned Sentralbadet public bath. Custom-built instruments playable by both deaf and hearing participants explored expanded forms of listening and sound production. Associated initiatives such as the White Cat Café, developed with members of Bergen’s deaf community, created social spaces centered on vibration and tactile sound.

The freethought component organized seminars, meals, and discursive gatherings examining infrastructure as a social and cultural condition, while PRAXES presented research-based exhibitions and performances focusing on the practices of Lynda Benglis and Marvin Gaye Chetwynd.

Critical reception noted the edition’s decentralized structure and its departure from a unified curatorial narrative in favor of parallel and independently developed propositions.

== Participants ==
Bergen Assembly 2016 – Venues, Projects, and Participants
| Venue | Exhibition / Project | Artists and Contributors |
|---|---|---|
| Sentralbadet | WITHIN / Infinite Ear | Tarek Atoui; Pauline Oliveros; Espen Sommer Eide; Trond Lossius; Alwynne Pritchard; Gerhard Stäbler; Kari Telstad Sundet; André Bratten |
| KODE 4 | Primary Structures | Lynda Benglis |
| Bergen School of Architecture | Glacier Burger | Lynda Benglis |
| Kunstgarasjen | Double Albatross | Lynda Benglis |
| Entrée | On Screen | Lynda Benglis |
| Bergen Kunsthall | Adhesive Products | Lynda Benglis |
| St. Jørgens Garasje | The Cell Group (Episode Two) | Marvin Gaye Chetwynd |
| Various venues | Council | Council (Grégory Castéra; Sandra Terdjman) |
| Various venues | Research, writing, and mediation | Rhea Dall; Kristine Siegel |
| Various venues | Ensemble and performance programmes | BIT20 Ensemble; Mats Lindström; Thierry Madiot |
