= Thornton Willis =

American abstract painter (1936–2025)

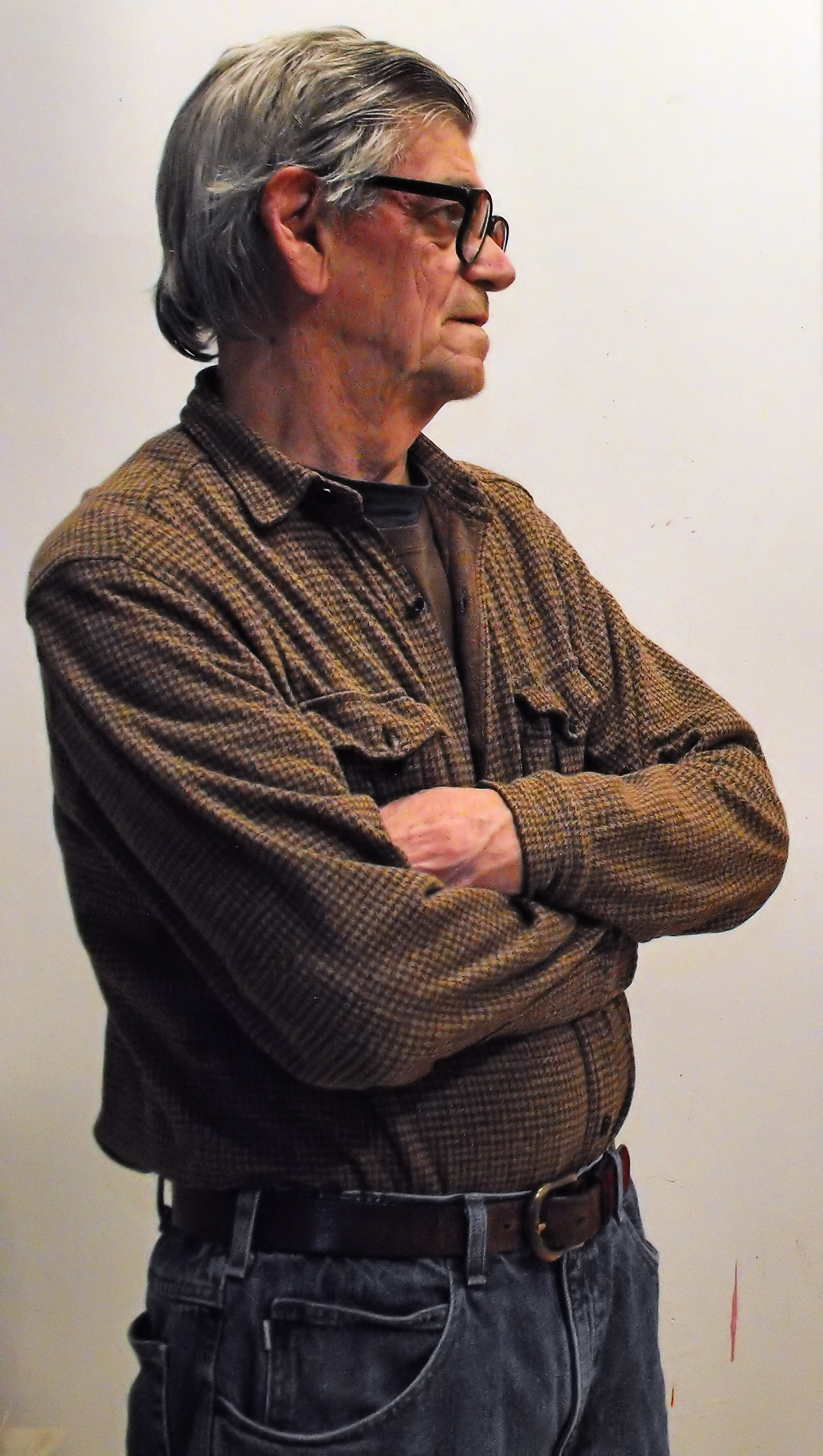
- Willis in 2013
- Born: May 25, 1936; Pensacola, Florida, U.S.
- Died: June 15, 2025 (aged 89); New York City, U.S.
- Years active: 1967–2025
- Website: thorntonwillis.com

Thornton Wilson Willis (May 25, 1936 – June 15, 2025) was an American abstract painter. He contributed to the New York School of painting since the late 1960s. Viewed as a member of the Third Generation of American Abstract Expressionists, his work is associated with Abstract Expressionism, Lyrical Abstraction, Process Art, Postminimalism, Bio-morphic Cubism (a term he coined), and Color Field painting. Willis was a member of American Abstract Artists.

== Biography ==
Thornton Wilson Willis was born on May 25, 1936, in Pensacola, Florida. His father, Willard Willis, was an evangelical preacher in the Church of Christ. Willis spent formative years in Montgomery, Alabama, returning to graduate from Tate High School in Pensacola, Florida. After three years in the United States Marine Corps Willis studied, under the G.I. Bill, at Auburn University for one year transferring to the University of Southern Mississippi where he graduated with a B.A. in 1962. In the summer of 1964, he enrolled at the University of Alabama, in Tuscaloosa, for graduate studies and received a teaching assistantship, and his M.A. in 1966. While at the University of Alabama he was befriended by the American football quarterback Joe Namath, met visiting artist Theodoros Stamos, and primarily studied painting with Melville Price, a painter who had shown in New York City with Franz Kline and Willem de Kooning and had been a member of The Club at the Cedar Tavern. During these years, Willis also participated in the Civil Rights Movement including the march from Selma to Montgomery, led by Martin Luther King Jr.

Throughout his painting studies, Willis became highly influenced by the tenets of Abstract Expressionism embodied in The New York School of painting, including second generation painters such as Robert Rauschenberg and Jasper Johns. His early work was equally informed by the more reductive paintings of Piet Mondrian and Frank Stella. These two polarities, Expressionism and Cubism were the early foundations of his paintings and continued to inform his work.

In 1967 Willis accepted a teaching position at Wagner College on Staten Island, and moved to New York City. He established his first studio in the Chelsea district of Manhattan. In 1968, he had his first one-person show at the Henri Gallery in Washington, DC. In New York, Willis met fellow painters, Dan Christensen, Jules Olitski, Ken Showell as well as sculptors and installation artists Richard Serra, Alan Saret, and Gordon Matta-Clark, all working out of a process art orientation.

Willis was married three times. His marriages to Peggy Whisenhant and Jane Miles ended in divorce, and his marriage to fellow painter Vered Lieb lasted until his death, from COVID-19 and pneumonia, on June 15, 2025, at the age of 89, at a hospital in Manhattan. He had a son from his marriage to Whisenhant and a daughter from his marriage to Lieb.

=== The Slat Paintings ===
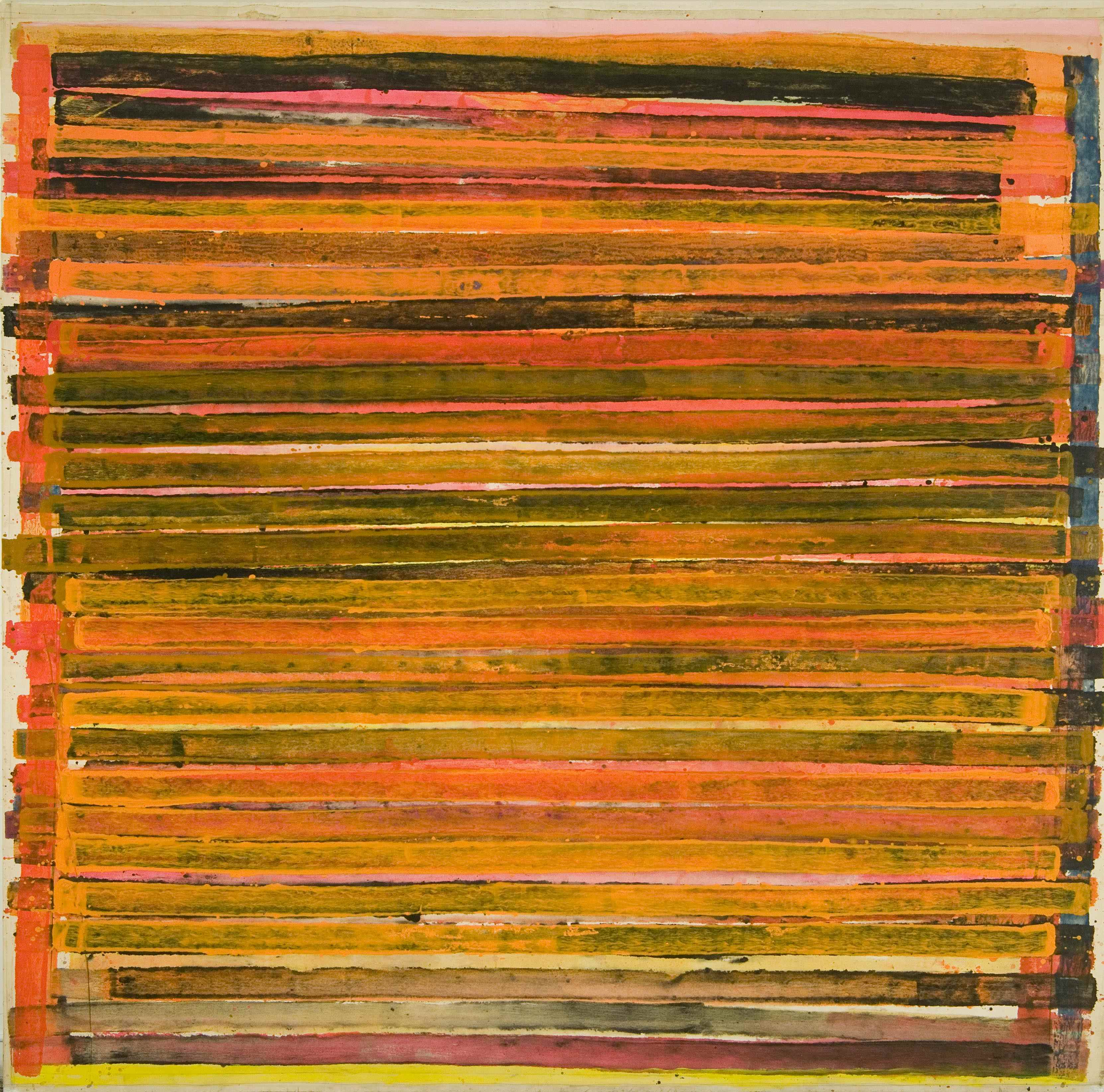
Thornton Willis "Red Wall" 1969, Acrylic on Canvas, 103x108 inches.

From 1967 to 1973, Willis worked on a series of paintings now called his "Slat Series" involving a "wet on wet" process working on the floor on large wet unstretched canvas and using rollers with long extension handles to develop striped bands across the entire picture plane. In 1970, Willis was included in the exhibition entitled "Lyrical Abstraction" curated by Larry Aldrich, and was represented in ut by the painting "Wall", (1969, acrylic on canvas, 96 inches by 114 inches).The exhibition was originally exhibited at the Aldrich Museum of Contemporary Art, in Ridgefield, Connecticut. Some of the other artists connected with Lyrical Abstraction were Victoria Barr, Jake Berthot, Dan Christensen, Ronnie Landfield, Pat Lipsky, John Torreano, Phillip Wofford, and Robert Zakanitch. When in 1971, Mr. Aldrich donated this collection to The Whitney Museum of American Art, John Baur, the museum director, mounted a second Lyrical Abstraction exhibition and Willis's painting Wall became part of the Whitney Museum's permanent collection.

The "Slat" series also attracted Bykert Gallery director, Klaus Kertess, and in 1971 Willis joined the Paley and Lowe Gallery, New York City, as part of its original stable of eight artists including, Joan Snyder, Mary Heilmann, Peter Pinchbeck, Herbert Schiffrin, Fred Gudziet, Mike Bakaty, Peter Hradley, and Michael Goldberg, who joined later. A "Slat" painting was purchased by William Paley, then Chairman of the Board of CBS, and is now housed in The Paley Center for Media in Manhattan.

From 1971 to 1972, Willis taught painting at Louisiana State University in New Orleans. He had a one-person show of his "Slat" paintings at the Simonne Stern Gallery, New Orleans in 1970, and at The New Orleans Museum of Fine Art (then The Delgado Museum); which also owns a large slat painting, in 1971. He continued to show with Simonne Stern through 1974.

=== The Wedge Paintings ===
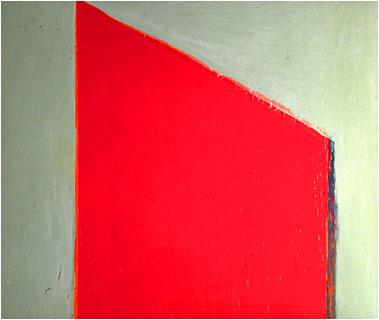
Thornton Willis "Red Warrior" 1980, Acrylic on Canvas, 84x100 inches.

After returning to New York City, Willis began his formalist compositions exploring Form and Field ambiguity that led to his "Wedge" series, 1974-1982. During this time he co-founded "Review: Artists on Art" with his wife. He showed his work at the Holly Solomon Gallery, NYC, in 1976, and in 1979 Thornton Willis won a Guggenheim Fellowship for painting. In the same year his work was included in the controversial exhibition "American Painting: The Eighties, a critical interpretation" organized and curated by Barbara Rose. The exhibition opened at the Grey Art Gallery at NYU in New York City and traveled first to The Houston Museum of Fine Arts, then to the American Center in Paris (now defunct) before traveling around the world as a United States Ambassadorial show to over twenty other countries.

In 1979, Willis exhibited his "Wedge" Paintings at the 55 Mercer Street Gallery where the work attracted the attention of British collectors, Robin Symes, and Charles and Doris Saatchi. He showed the "Wedge" paintings at the Sidney Janis Gallery in New York City in 1980 in an exhibition titled "Seven Young Americans" curated by Sam Hunter which included his friend and fellow artist Sean Scully. In 1980 he had a one-person show at the Oscarsson Hood Gallery who would represent the artist until 1986. In 1980 he met the European dealer, Claes Nordenhake, and exhibited his "Wedge" paintings in Malmo, Sweden, Gothenburg, Sweden, Helsinki, Finland, and Geneva, Switzerland.

In 1982, Willis began a series of overlapping "wedges' or "double wedges' that allowed exploration of the vertical colored bands created where the edges met. "Striped Suit", 1982, a large double wedge canvas was featured on the cover of Arts Magazine with an essay by Steven Henry Madoff, Looking for Thornton Willis: A Treatise. With the re-opening of the Museum of Modern Art in Manhattan in 1984, Willis exhibited Red Warrior in An International Survey of Recent Painting and Sculpture. By 1984 the work had changed again as Willis sought a more complex geometry. By 1990 he had gone back to the triangle but this time in an overall grid for which he coined the term "biomorphic cubism". The "Triangle" paintings would span a decade from 1990 to 2000.

=== The Triangle Paintings ===
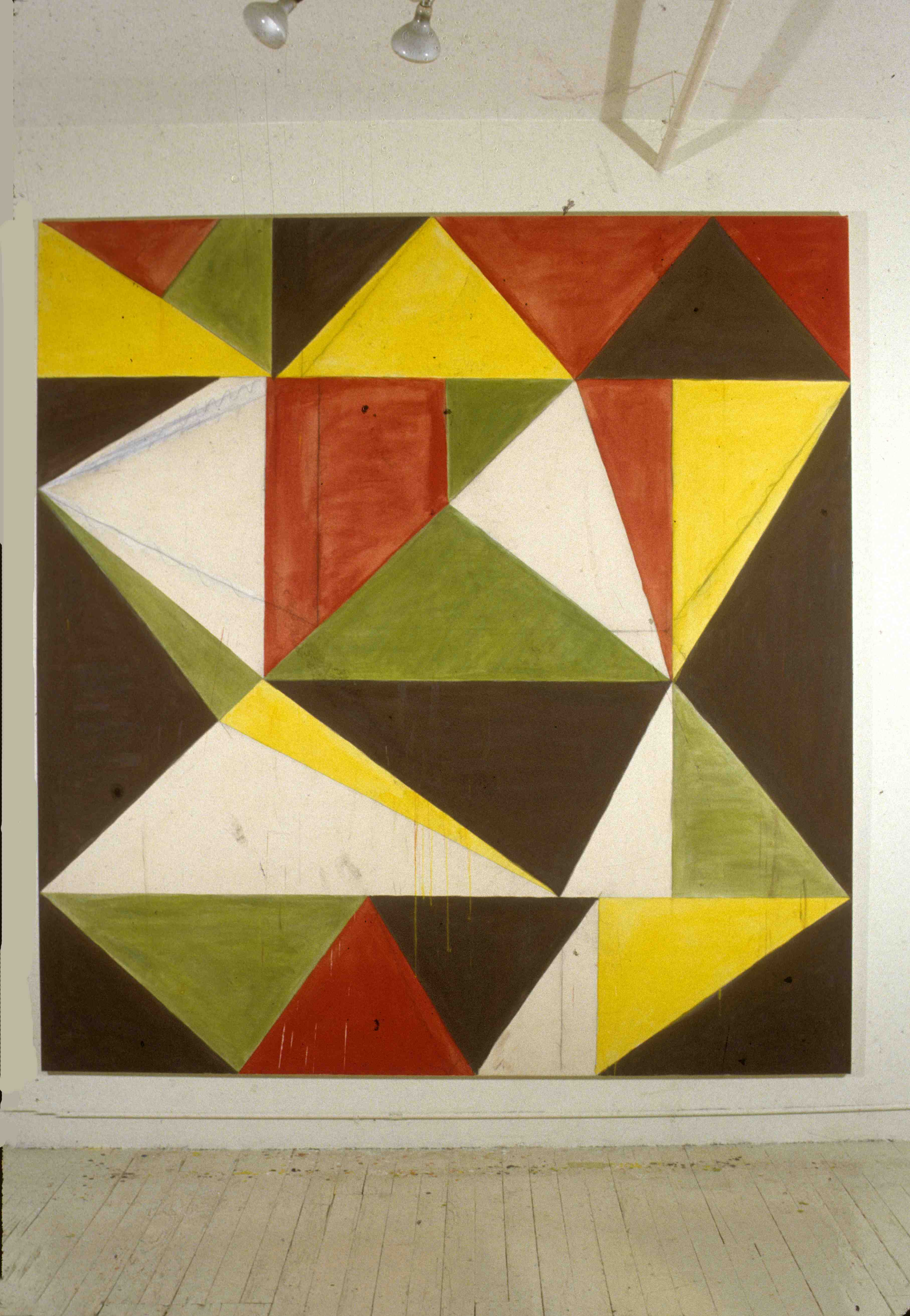
Thornton Willis "Black Bear" 1993, Acrylic on Canvas, 117x108 inches.

In 1991, Willis showed new work at the Andre Emmerich Gallery, in New York City, in an exhibition titled Abstract Painting: the 90’s where art critic Barbara Rose chose to revisit certain painters from the 80s show. A one-person exhibition of large scale Triangle paintings and oil stick on paper followed in 1993, at the Andre Zarre Gallery where the artist employed a tight grid overridden by gesture and a plastic color palette. In the 2001 catalogue essay for Painted in New York City: The Presence of the Past, art critic Robert C. Morgan noted Willis's Abstract Expressionist roots and the newer element of restraint.

In 2005, Willis teamed up with fellow painter, James Little for a two-person show in Williamsburg, Brooklyn at the Sideshow Gallery working with owner-painter, Richard Timperio. From 2007 on, Willis showed with the Elizabeth Harris Gallery in New York City, with one-person exhibitions in 2007, 2009, and 2011. Willis sustained a long-term relationship with art dealer Harris begun in 1980 when she co-founded Oscarsson Hood Gallery, on 57th street.

=== The Grid Paintings ===
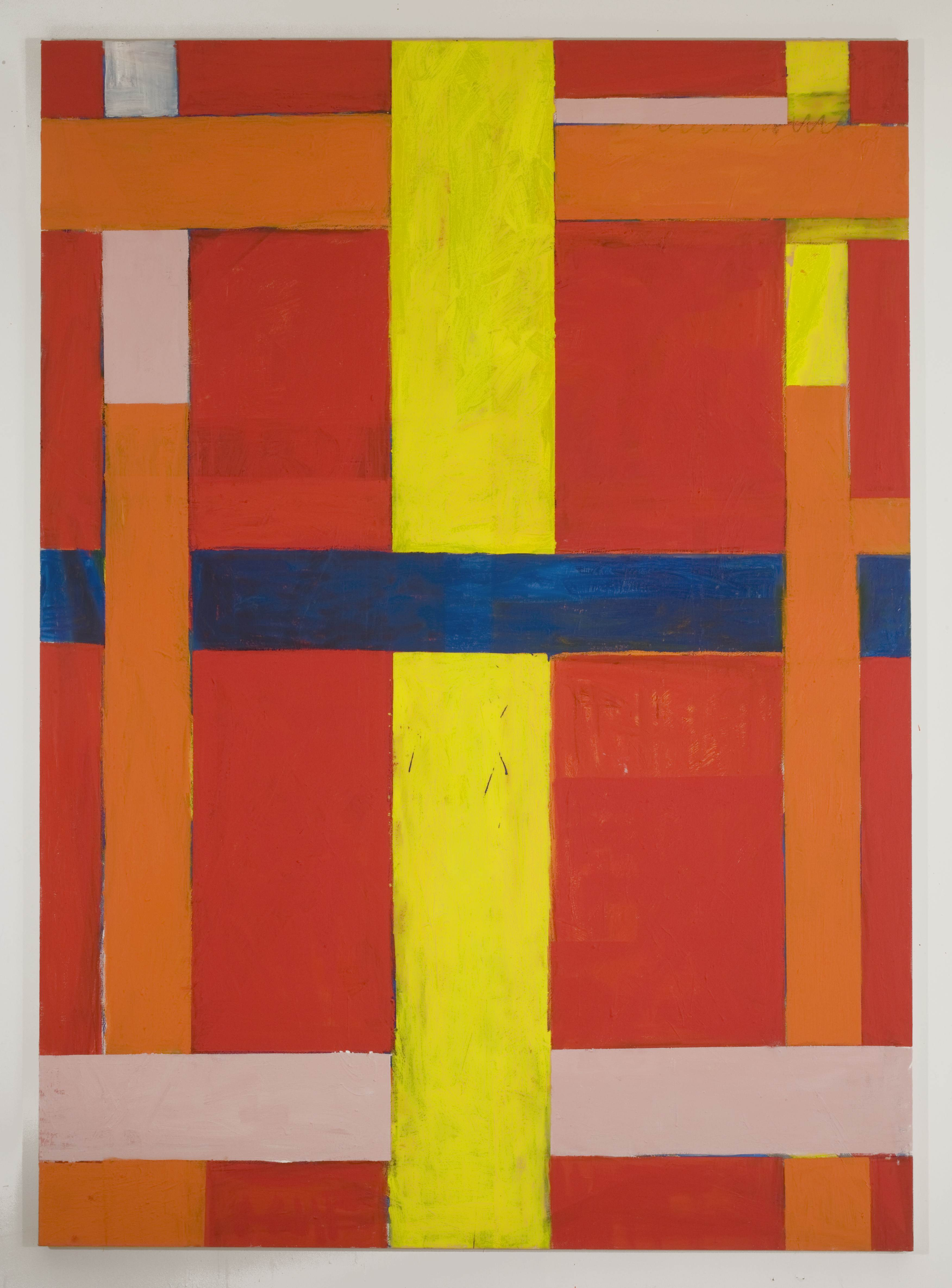
Thornton Willis "Conversion" 2008, Oil on Canvas, 97x70 inches.

Shortly after the exhibition titled Painting: 40 Years," a retrospective at the Sideshow Gallery in 2007, Willis returned to a rectilinear format. Combining the early "Slat" paintings, with exploration of form and field in his "Wedge" series, he created a body of work he entitled "Lattices" where lines appear to weave forward and back. Michael Feldman documented the transition to this new work in a film, in 2008-09, Portrait of an American Painter In 2009, Willis had a one-person show at the Elizabeth Harris Gallery, with a catalogue titled The Lattice Paintings (with an essay by James Panero). In his essay, Panero writes, "Ever since his wedge paintings in 1970s, Thornton played with the density of volumes, the interaction of colors to come forward and recede, and the character of the line."

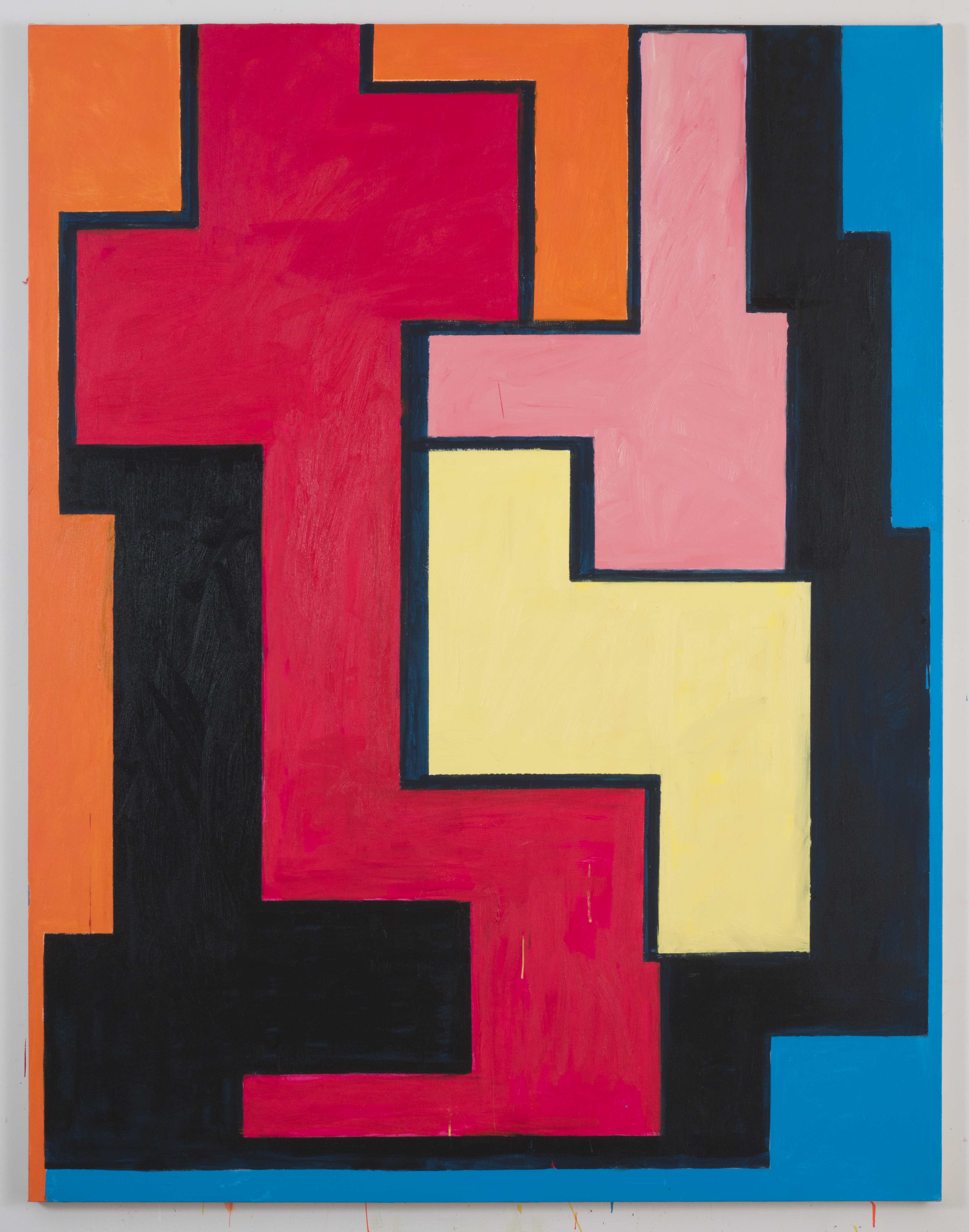
Thornton Willis "Juggernaut" 2010, Oil on Canvas, 79x61 inches.

Two years later, in 2011, Willis took on form over field where form or volume appear to dominate the line. The resulting images harken to the dense mass of city buildings and maps. In an essay for this new series, Lance Esplund wrote: "Those who have followed Willis's work over the years may see his current series of paintings as a departure from "Slats" of the 1960s, the "Wedges," or "Fins," of the 1970s and early '80s, the triangular facets of recent years, and the "Lattice" paintings from his last show, in 2009, at Elizabeth Harris. But all of these pictures have in common the allover surface plane held in tension, between figure and ground, as an interwoven field. They also share the subject of the urban landscape".

Willis continued to show with Elizabeth Harris, and in April 2013, had a one-person show of new "Step" paintings. The artist included in the show, consisting predominantly of his paintings, several three dimensional painted wall pieces or assemblages. The wall sculptures, starting with a painted canvas base, are built up with layers of found objects and painted wood. Also in April and May 2013, two large paintings by Willis were exhibited at Gagosian Gallery, 980 Madison, New York, in the exhibition entitled, "Works of the Jenney Archive."

== Selected museum and public collections ==
- Museum of Modern Art, New York, NY
- The Solomon R. Guggenheim Museum, New York, NY
- The Whitney Museum of American Art, New York, NY
- The Phillips Collection, Washington, D.C
- Aldrich Museum of Contemporary Art, Ridgefield, Ct.
- Albright-Knox Art Gallery, Buffalo, NY
- Denver Art Museum, Denver, CO
- Carnegie Museums, Pittsburgh, PA
- Herbert F. Johnson Museum of Art, Cornell University, Ithaca, NY
- New Orleans Museum of Art, New Orleans, Louisiana
- Memorial Art Gallery, University of Rochester, Rochester, NY
- Rose Art Museum, Brandeis University
- The Arkansas Art Center, Little Rock, AR
- Museum of Broadcasting, NYC
- The Power Institute of Fine Arts, Sydney, Australia
- The High Museum of Art, Atlanta, GA
- Oklahoma City Museum of Art, Oklahoma City, OK
- Portland Art Museum, Portland, OR
- Columbia Museum of Art, Columbia, SC
- Memphis Brooks Museum of Art, Memphis, TN
- Nora Eccles Harrison Museum of Art, Utah State University, Logan UT
- Virginia Museum of Fine Arts, Richmond, VA
- Huntington Museum of Art, Huntington, WV
- Milwaukee Art Museum, Milwaukee, WI
- The Herb and Dorothy Vogel Collection, New York, NY

== Awards ==
- The Pollock-Krasner Foundation, Painting Fellowship, 2001
- Adolph and Esther Gottlieb Fellowship, 1991
- National Endowment for the Arts, Printmaking Fellowship, 1984
- National Endowment for the Arts, Painting Fellowship, 1980
- John Simon Guggenheim Memorial Foundation, Painting Fellowship, 1979

== Selected books and catalogues ==
Thornton Willis: Interviews & Essays, copyright 2018, ISBN 978-0-9906194-8-2, Library of Congress Control Number: 2017954106, Greenpoint Press Art Books, Greenpoint Press NY, accepted into Library of Congress

- Tom Armstrong, A singular Vision: Architecture Art Landscape, Copyright 2011, ISBN 978-1-59372-043-8 Frontise-piece pp. 1, 207 Printed by Quantuck Lane Press, NY, Distributed by W.W. Norton and Company, NY
- Exhibition Catalogue, Thornton Willis, copyright 2011, Elizabeth Harris Gallery, essay copyright 2011 Lance Esplund
- Exhibition Catalogue, Thornton Willis: The Lattice Paintings, copyright 2009, Elizabeth Harris Gallery, essay copyright 2009 James Panero
- The Dorothy and Herbert Vogel Collection: Fifty Works for Fifty States, produced by the National Endowment for the Arts, Washington DC., LCCN 2008-35963, OCLC 244476545, ISBN 9780615232713, repro. p. 79
- Peter Bellamy, The Artist Project: Portraits of the Real Art World / New Artists 1981-1990, published by IN Publishing New York, New York, 1991, ISBN 0-9625994-1-7, p. 240
- The Phillips Collection, A Summary Catalogue, 1985, ISBN 0-943044-05-7, repro. p. 251
- Carrier, David, "The Aesthete in the City; The Philosophy and Practice of American Abstract Painting in the 1980s," The Pennsylvania State University Press, University Park Pennsylvania, 1994, Chapters 10 (p188) and 13 (p 225), ISBN 0-271-00943-8
- Artists of the ‘80’s: Selected works from the Maslow Collection, published by the Sordoni Art Gallery, Wilkes College, Wilkes-Barre, PA., 1989, ISBN 0-942945-01-8 Frontispiece (color), pp. 74-75
- C.E. Licka, Thornton Willis’ Abstract Syntax, Thornton Willis Recent Work: Paintings and Drawings, a catalogue, published by the University of Southern Mississippi, 1985, Copyrights, on the occasion of the University of Southern Mississippi's 75th Anniversary, intro. by Chairman William C. Baggett Jr.
- David Carrier, Theoretical Perspectives on the Arts, Sciences and Technology, Part II: Postmodernist Art Criticism, Leonardo, Vol. 18, No.2, 1985, repro. 109, p. 112
- Kynaston McShine, An International Survey of Recent Painting and Sculpture, copyright 1984 by Museum of Modern Art, New York, Library of Congress Catalog, ISBN 0-87070-391-9, repros. pp. 322–323
- Joseph Masheck, "Historical Present: Essays of the 1970s," Contemporary American Art Critics, No. 3, edited by Donald Kuspit, UMI Research Press, Michigan, 1984, Chapter 22, pp249–257, "Thornton Willis and Abstract Identity"
- Exhibition catalogue, ARS: 83 Helsinki, The Art Museum of the Ateneum, 1983, ISBN 951-9289-08-9 repro. pp. 190–191
- Exhibition Catalogue, Donald Kuspit and Fernando Pernes, LIS ’81: Lisbon international Show, International Exhibition of Drawings, published by Direccao, 1982 repros. p. 427
- Exhibition Catalogue, Georgia Coopersmith, 20th Anniversary Exhibition of the Vogel Collection, published by the Brainerd Art Gallery, Potsdam, NY. 1982, ISBN 0-942746-03-1 repro., unpaginated.
- Exhibition catalogue, Thomas W. Leavitt and Anita Feldman, Painting Up Front, published by the Herbert F. Johnson Museum of Art, Cornell University, Ithaca NY. LCCN 81--80250, OCLC 7725107. Statement and repro, unpaginated
- RE-VIEW: Artists on Art Magazine, Vol. II and III, no. 1, June 1979 ISSN 0161-5114, repros. pp. 46-51
- RE-VIEW: Artists on Art Magazine, Vol. 1, no. 1, January 1978, ISSN 0161-5114 pp. 53-57.
- Exhibition catalogue, Lyrical Abstraction, published by the Whitney Museum of American Arts, New York, NY., LCCN 73-162569, OCLC 154498. 1971
- Exhibition catalogue, Richard Lanier, New Work: New York, published by the American Federation of Arts, New York, New York, Library of Congress Card no. LCCN 70--13503, OCLC 104047. 1970

== Selected sources ==
- James Panero "Gallery Chronicle" The New Criterion, 2012, Volume 30, Number 6, p 52
- James Panero "Gallery Chronicle" The New Criterion, 2011, Volume 29, Number 6, p 57
- Lilly Wei, "Thornton Willis at Elizabeth Harris" Exhibition Reviews, "Art in America" September 2009 #08 p 149
- Tom McCormick, Melville Price: Works from the Sixties, Tom McCormick Gallery, Copyright 2009, Color Reproduction, essay, pp. 14–15
- James Panero, Pilgrim's Process, Catalogue Essay, Thornton Willis: The Lattice Paintings, March 2009
- Lance Esplund, "The Met's Memorable Year", The New York Sun, Thursday, Jan. 3, 2008, Arts & Letters, p 21
- James Panero, Critics Notebook, "Comeback Kid", Art & Antiques, Dec. 2007, No. 12, pp. 110–114 color reproductions.
- Lance Esplund, "A Show of Painterly Swagger", The New York Sun, Nov. 8, 2007, Vol. 123, No. 146, p 22
- James Panero, Gallery Chronicle, The New Criterion, 2007, Vol. 26, No. 3 pp. 61–62
- Jed Perl, "How The Art World Lost its Mind to Money: Laissez-Faire Aesthetics," The New Republic, Feb 5, 2007
- John Goodrich, Gallery Going "Black & White and Big All Over", The New York Sun, December 14, 2006
- Channing Joseph, Arts & Letters, "Geometry In Color," page 1 color reproduction, Gallery-Going, "Making a Quantum Comeback" December 19, 2006 p 13
- Naves, Mario, "A Shared Aesthetic and Goal, Raising the Bar at the Sideshow", New York Observer, April 18, 2005 p 8
- Maine, Stephen, "Dateline Brooklyn, Artnet, April 2005
- La Rocca, Ben, "Thornton Willis and James Little", The Brooklyn Rail, April 2005
- Lieb, Vered, "Thornton Willis and James Little: Raising the Bar", N.Y., 2005
- Arts Magazine, Vol. 10, No 3/4, p71, March/April 2005
- Lieb, Vered, "Thornton Willis and James Little", Abstract Art on Line, April 2005
- Panero, James, "Gallery Chronicles", The New Criterion, May 2005, Vol 23, no 9, p50
- Walentini, Joseph, "Reviews: Thornton Willis and James Little", AbstractArtonLine, May 2005
- Perl, Jed, "On Art: Unity and Variety", The New Republic, Vol. 228, No 3, Issue 4593, Jan. 27, 2003
- Kaufman, Leslie, "The Lost Legacy of Stewart Hitch", The New York Times, The City, Section 14, Feb.2, 2003
- Morgan, Robert C., "Painted in New York City: The Presence of the Past", catalog essay published by Hofstra University for "Painted In New York City", Jan. 2001
- Lieb, Vered, "The Art of Absolute Desire", N.Y. Arts Magazine, 1999, Vol. 4, No. 8, pp50–1
- Rosenthal, Deborah, "Abstract Tendencies", Rider University Press, 1997
- Scott, Sue, "Reviews: New York", ARTnews, Feb. 1994, p143
- Lloyd W., Ann, "Review of Exhibitions", Art in America, May 1994, p112
- Perl, Jed, "Code Name Painting" The New Criterion, Dec. 1993, Vol.12 No 4
- Lieb, Vered, "Objective Spirit: Thornton Willis", Arts Magazine, Nov.1986
- Heartney, Eleanor, "Thornton Willis at Oscarsson Hood", ARTnews, 1985
- Gaugh, Harry T., "Franz Kline: The Man and the Myth", ARTnews, Dec. 1985
- Carrier, David, "Betwixt and Between Illusion and Literality: Thornton Willis’ Recent Paintings", p194, Nov. 1984
- Rosenthal, Deborah, "First Underground Show", Art in America, Nov. 1984, pp157–8
- Madoff, Steven, "Looking for Thornton Willis: A Treatise", Arts Magazine, March 1983, cover and pp16–118
- Murray, Jesse, Flash Art, Jan. 1981
- Masheck, Joseph, "Abstract Identity: Thornton Willis", Oct. 1981, pp126–131, reproductions pp. 126, 129, 130
- Cornu, Daniel, "La Peinture Abstraite en Question", Tribune De Geneve, Dec. 16, 1980, p27
- Parks, Addison, Arts Magazine, Dec. 1980, p53
- Hilton Kramer, Seven Young Americans, The New York Times, April 18, 1980, Section C, p. 18
- Ratcliff, Carter, "55 Mercer St. Show", Art in America, March 1980, p116
- Frackman, Noel, "The Paintings of Thornton Willis", Arts Magazine, Nov.1980, pp58–60
- Feldman, Anita, "Space and Subjectivity", Artforum, Sept. 1979, pp49–53
- Boyce, David, "Interview with Thornton Willis", Arts Magazine, Nov. 1979, p116

== Online references ==
Thornton Willis website: http://www.thorntonwillis.com/home.shtml

James Kalm, YouTube, October 2007, "Thornton Willis Opening at Sideshow" http://blip.tv/file/447777

Brian Sherwin, myartspace.com, contributing editor: http://www.myartspace.com/blog/2007/09/art-space-talk-thornton-willis.html

Jed Perl, The New Republic, Feb 5, 2007: http://www.pierretristam.com/Bobst/07/wf021407.htm

Michael Feldman, "Portrait of an American Painter" film, 2008-09: http://www.thorntonwillis.com/media.shtml

Joanne Mattera, "Joanne Mattera Art Blog" 2009 review "Color-Time-Space" https://joannemattera.blogspot.com/2009/10/color-time-space-at-lohin-geduld.html

Joanne Mattera, "Joanne Mattera Art Blog" 2009 review Thornton Willis at Elizabeth Harris Gallery https://joannemattera.blogspot.com/2009/04/thornton-willis-at-elizabeth-harris.html

Steven Alexander, "Seven Alexander Journal" 2009 review "Color-Time-Space" https://stevenalexanderjournal.blogspot.com/2009/10/color-time-space-at-lohin-geduld-janet.html

Steven Alexander, "Steven Alexander Journal" 2009 review Thornton Wilis at Elizabeth Harris Gallery https://stevenalexanderjournal.blogspot.com/2009/03/thornton-willis-at-elizabeth-harris.html

Leaves of Glass, 2009 "Needing some Color-Time-Space" https://leavesofglass.blogspot.com/2009_09_01_archive.html

Thomas B. Harrison, ‘Southern Abstraction’ is a compelling view of a provocative art form (gallery), Al.com, June 1, 2012 http://www.al.com/entertainment/index.ssf/2012/06/southern_abstraction_is_a_comp.html

Structural Abstraction: Paintings by Thornton Willis, Alabama.travel, June 11, 2012 http://www.alabama.travel/events/structural_abstraction_paintings_by_thornton_willi

New York Artist, UA alum to show at Sarah Moody gallery, AL.com, September 24, 2012 http://www.al.com/entertainment/index.ssf/2012/09/new_york_artist_ua_alum_to_sho.html

New York Artist to Show Work at UA Gallery, University of Alabama News, September 24, 2012 http://uanews.ua.edu/2012/09/new-york-artist-to-show-work-at-ua-gallery/

Thornton Willis show card by UA Dept. of Art & Art History, September 27, 2012 https://www.flickr.com/photos/uaart/8048336805/

Thornton Willis @ The Sarah Moody Gallery by Paul Behnke, Structure and Imagery September 30, 2012 https://structureandimagery.blogspot.com/2012/09/thornton-willis-sarah-moody-gallery.html

Accolades for Oct. 1, 2012, The University of Alabama, October 1, 2012 http://dialog.ua.edu/2012/10/accolades-for-oct-1-2012/

More about Thornton Willis, The University of Alabama, October 9, 2012 http://art.ua.edu/site/more-about-thornton-willis/

James Panero, "Studio Visit: Thornton Supreme Fiction", January 8, 2013 http://www.supremefiction.com/theidea/2013/01/studio-visit-thornton-willis.html

James Panero, "Studio Visit: Thornton Willis", The New Criterion, January 9, 2013 http://www.newcriterion.com/posts.cfm/Studio-visit--Thornton-Willis-7007

Karabenick, Julie. "An Interview with Artist Thornton Willis," Archived, Geoform.net, Sept. 2013.
