= Jacqueline Winsor =

Canadian-American sculptor (1941–2024)

- Born: Vera Jacqueline Winsor; October 20, 1941; St. John's, Newfoundland
- Died: September 2, 2024 (aged 82); New York City, U.S.
- Other name: Jackie Winsor
- Education: Massachusetts College of Art and Design; Rutgers University
- Known for: Sculpture
- Spouse: Keith Sonnier (m. 1966; div. 1980)

Vera Jacqueline Winsor (October 20, 1941 – September 2, 2024) was a Newfoundland-born American sculptor. Her style, which developed in the early 1970s as a reaction to the work of minimal artists, has been characterized as post-minimal, anti-form, and process art.

Informed by her own personal history, Winsor's sculptures from this period sit at the intersection of minimalism and feminism, maintaining an attention to elementary geometry and symmetrical form while eschewing minimalism's reliance on industrial materials and methods through the incorporation of hand-crafted, organic materials such as wood and hemp.

Winsor exhibited her works in several exhibitions. In 1979, a mid-career retrospective of her work opened at the Museum of Modern Art, New York, (MoMA); this was the first time MoMA had presented a retrospective of work by a woman artist since 1946. Other exhibitions of her work included "American Woman Artist Show," April 14 – May 14, 1974, at the Kunsthaus Hamburg (Germany), curated by Sybille Niester and Lil Picard; "26 Contemporary Women Artists," April 18 – June 13, 1971, at the Aldrich Museum of Contemporary Art, curated by Lucy Lippard; and "Jackie Winsor: With and Within", October 19, 2014 – April 5, 2015, at the Aldrich Museum of Contemporary Art, curated by Amy Smith-Stewart.

== Early life and education ==
Vera Jacqueline Winsor was born in St. John's, Newfoundland October 20, 1941. She was the second of three daughters and the descendant of three hundred years of Canadian ships' captains and farmers. Winsor was brought up in an old-fashioned, Anglophilic manner. A large part of her adolescence was spent helping her father build houses. One of Winsor's jobs was to "straighten the old nails and then hammer them down", an action she would later introduce into her own work. Winsor's family moved frequently during the 1940s due to her father's job, between Newfoundland, Nova Scotia, and New Brunswick. In 1952, Winsor and her family emigrated to the United States and moved to Boston, Massachusetts. Boston's urbanity brought Winsor culture shock, so she would still return to Newfoundland during her summers.

Winsor began her formal art studies at the Massachusetts College of Art, where she focused on painting. It was not until her time in graduate school at Rutgers University, which she attended from 1965 to 1967, that she began to experiment with sculpture. Winsor received a B.F.A. degree from Massachusetts College of Art and Design in 1965. Winsor received her M.F.A. degree from Rutgers University in 1967; where she met classmates and artists Keith Sonnier (whom she married in 1966), and Joan Snyder. The three artists then moved to New York City after graduating.

== Career ==
Winsor's work can be categorized as process art, "anti-form", and "eccentric abstraction". She is known for having consistently employed geometric forms like the cube and the sphere and she connected process with appearance. Winsor believed that her pieces of art are connected to specific occurrences in her life, however not directly connected by any personal events that she went through.

During the late 1960s, Winsor and her contemporaries, which included artists such as Lynda Benglis, Eva Hesse, Barry Le Va, Bruce Nauman, Joel Shapiro, and Richard Tuttle, collectively pushed modern sculpture into a new "Postminimalist" direction. Curator Richard Marshall stated that these artists "shared a willingness, even a need to reinvent form (often using novel and unexpected materials), to invest that form with meaning."

The first sculptures Winsor created in New York were made with materials which are now associated with "anti-formal" sculpture. These materials included rubber sheeting, tubes, cord, and even hair. Winsor also began experimenting with rope dipped in latex or polyester resin to create linear shapes.The first significant piece of her career was Rope Trick, a six foot tall length of rope in which she embedded with a metal rod to keep it standing upright. Although visually similar to the works of minimalism, Winsor's sculptures did not aim to completely separate herself or her personal experience from the work she was creating. Winsor believed that an artist's work is a reflection of their inner selves and she demonstrated this in her rope pieces, as they relate back to her heritage of sea captains. Winsor even remarked that those kinds of ropes "might be used to tie an ocean liner to its dock".

An important influence for Winsor during this time was American dancer, choreographer, and filmmaker Yvonne Rainer. Rainer's work was experimental and its intention was to put the body back into abstraction and use it along with motion to create shape. Her performances were often based on particular actions or tasks, which Winsor felt had a relationship to the ways in which she herself performed tasks in her own work. Winsor remarked, "What interested me was that these abstractions had a physical presence because they were acted out with bodies ," as opposed to "the hands-off sensibility toward abstraction" typically seen in minimalist sculpture. Winsor used very involved, hands-on processes to create her sculptures, including nailing, wrapping, joining, and measuring. Winsor's work-flow has been described as being slow and obsessive. On average. Winsor produced only three sculptures a year. Winsor described her outlook, "Maintaining integrity toward the perfection you envisioned in the beginning is a constant concern. I spend an enormous amount of time just trying to imagine if an eighth of an inch at some point is going to make a major difference in the completed construction of the piece." Her work not only examines form and material, but also process, space, surface, weight, and density. Winsor asserted her role as an object-maker by creating works with clear material integrity.

She is also known for her thick rope pieces, usually four-inch rope and combines that with natural wood. Winsor also kept a sculpture in her studio that has more meaning to her than a random passerby. It is a plain sphere over a foot in diameter made of solid concrete. To her, it was a perfect symbol of density.

Winsor latterly taught at the School of Visual Arts in New York City.

== Work ==
- Double Bound Circle consists of a piece of rope that is as thick as a rope that ties an ocean liner. It coils upon itself.
- Chunk Piece was created in 1970 and is made from continuous lengths of rope that are cut into sections that are three feet long. They are bound together near their frayed ends to create a dense cylinder.
- Nail Piece was created in 1970 and is a seven-foot long stack of wood planks. They are put together and are densely nailed to each other at every layer.

== Feminist art movement ==
Winsor was included in the exhibition More than Minimal: Feminism and Abstraction in the '70s (1996) at Rose Art Museum, along with Lynda Benglis, Jackie Ferrara, Nancy Graves, Eva Hesse, Ana Mendieta, Mary Miss, Ree Morton, Michelle Stuart, Dorothea Rockburne, and Hannah Wilke.

Despite being referenced as making work that went against the macho-minimalist sculpture movement, Winsor said, "when I think about things like feminism, it seems to me a political moment that supported the life I've had….I support it 100 percent although I have no real interest in it in my work."

== Personal life and death ==
Winsor was married to Keith Sonnier from 1966 until 1980, when they divorced. She died from a stroke and brain hemorrhage in Manhattan, New York City, on September 2, 2024, at the age of 82.
