= Keith Sonnier =

American artist (1941–2020)

- Born: James Keith Sonnier; July 31, 1941; Mamou, Louisiana, U.S.
- Died: July 18, 2020 (aged 78); Southampton, New York, U.S.
- Education: University of Louisiana at Lafayette, Rutgers University
- Known for: performance, sculpture
- Movement: Postminimalism, Process Art
- Spouse(s): Jacqueline Winsor (1966–1980, divorce), Nessia Leonzini Pope (1987–1998, divorce)
- Children: 1
- Website: www.keithsonnier.net

Keith Sonnier (July 31, 1941 – July 18, 2020) was an American postminimalist sculptor, performance artist, video, and light artist. Sonnier was one of the first artists to use light in sculpture in the 1960s. With his use of neon in combination with ephemeral materials he achieved international recognition. Sonnier was part of the Process Art movement.

== Biography ==
James Keith Sonnier was born July 31, 1941, in Mamou, Louisiana. His family was Cajun and Roman Catholic. His father was a hardware store owner, Joseph Sonnier, and his mother was a florist and singer, Mae Ledoux. His mother sang in a black choir and booked black bands for the town's youth centers, influencing his later work as an assistant to the head of the African Studies section of the Art History department at Rutgers University. Sonnier had two brothers, Barry Ledoux and Charles Sonnier.

He graduated in 1963 from Southwestern Louisiana Institute (now known as the University of Louisiana at Lafayette). In 1966, he graduated with his MFA degree from Rutgers University, where he studied under Allan Kaprow, Robert Watts, and Robert Morris. After graduation from Rutgers, he moved to New York City with Jackie Winsor and some of his former classmates. Sonnier credits his parents for pushing him to visit France, particularly Normandy and Paris, after he graduated from Southwestern Louisiana Institute. His parents encouraged him to branch out, expand his knowledge and study French, in order to connect with his French background.

At the time of his death he lived in Bridgehampton, New York. Sonnier died in Southampton on July 18, 2020, of MDS (Myelodysplastic syndrome) and complications from it at the age of 78.

== Work ==
Keith Sonnier began his career as a painter, but after working with his mentor Robert Morris in the mid 1960’s, he moved away from painting and used a variety of unique materials. Sonnier started moving towards the use of plastic, synthetic materials, and premade objects. Sonnier began experimenting with neon in 1968; neon lights became a signature material used in his sculptural works. The common materials Sonnier employed included neon and fluorescent lights; reflective materials; aluminum and copper; and glass and wires.

Some of his neon pieces are Lit Square, Dis-Play, Longhorn Study, and Ba-O-Ba. The Ba O Ba works consist of Sonnier’s works in neon sculpture, beginning in the sixties. The name Ba-O-Ba comes from a Haitian-Creole phrase meaning “bathing in moonlight”. In the early stages, the works were initially focused on the space of architectural interaction between horizontal planes. Sonnier eventually became more involved in large-scale publicly commissioned works, including Lightway, one of his largest installations in 1992, located in the Munich airport. One of his most notable exhibits was “Eccentric Abstraction” at the Fischbach Gallery in Manhattan, curated by Lucy Lippard in 1966.

== Personal life ==
In 1966, he married the sculptor Jackie Winsor, who at the time was a fellow art student from Rutgers University. His marriage to Winsor ended in divorce in 1980. Together they moved to New York City where they lived around renowned artists and musicians.

His second marriage was in 1987 to writer and curator, Nessia Leonzini Pope, ending in divorce by 1998. He had one child from his second marriage. Together they had their daughter, Olympia Sonnier.

== See also ==
- Contemporary sculptors and postminimalist artists: Bruce Nauman Eva Hesse, Richard Serra, Richard Tuttle, Barry LeVa
