= Alan Uglow =

English artist (1941–2011)

- Born: 19 July 1941; Luton, UK
- Died: 20 January 2011 (aged 69); New York City, US
- Known for: Artist
- Movement: Abstract expressionism

Alan Uglow (19 Jul 1941–20 Jan 2011) was a British visual artist who moved from London to New York City in 1969. Called "a painter's painter" by Roberta Smith, in addition to his paintings, Uglow made objects, sound-and-visual installations, photographs, and prints. He died in Manhattan at age sixty-nine from complications related to lung cancer.

== Career ==
United Kingdom

Starting in his early teens, Uglow attended Colchester School of Art, followed by Leicester College of Art. While at Leicester, he saw an exhibition titled "The New American Painting," a show of American Abstract Expressionism, at Tate Gallery, London (1959). He later commented, "[At seventeen], I wasn't sure I understood everything I was seeing, but I knew they would understand everything I was trying to do." Uglow went on to Central School, London, obtaining degrees in painting and in printmaking. His work was included in "Young Contemporaries," (London, 1960/64), "Bradford Spring Exhibition," (1963/64), Grabowski Gallery, (London, 1965), and "Contemporary British Painters," (Lyon, France, 1966). Several decades on, in 1995, Uglow had a one-person show at Gimpel Fils, London, curated by Simon Lee and Kay Gimpel.

United States

Uglow visited New York City for three weeks in 1968, moving there permanently in 1969. He soon met and was befriended by fellow painters Jake Berthot, Brice Marden, and Winston Roeth. In the early 1970s, Uglow and Roeth printed for Petersburg Press. In 1974, Uglow moved from his loft on Greene Street to one on the Bowery, where he lived and worked until his death.*

In 1974 and 1976, Uglow was in group shows at Bykert Gallery (founded by Klaus Kertess and Jeff Byers). In 1975, his work was included in the Whitney Biennial. After Kertess left Bykert, Uglow was asked by Mary Boone, former Bykert secretary, to join a new gallery she was planning to open. January 7, 1978, Mary Boone Gallery, 420 W. Broadway, opened with paintings by Chris Darton; Gordon Hart; Paul Mogensen; Gary Stephan; Alan Uglow. Uglow’s first one-person painting show with Boone, in 1978, opened concurrently with a one-person drawing show, Susan Caldwell Gallery, curated by Michael Walls. After a second one-person painting show at Boone, in 1979, Uglow left Mary Boone Gallery. He subsequently joined Lorence-Monk Gallery, (1985–1991), and Stark Gallery (1993–2002).

At Lorence-Monk, Uglow first exhibited his "low rider" paintings. It was also at Lorence-Monk that Uglow showed Signals, (1988), a four-panel piece, with sound, initially made to be shown as part of "Century '87," Amsterdam. At Stark, Uglow showed another sound piece, his football-inspired, Coach's Bench. Beginning in 1992, and continuing throughout 2009, Uglow made a series of paintings, titled Standards: all are 7' x 6' (214 x 183 cm), installed on wooden blocks. Related to those paintings is Portrait of a Standard, a series of silk screens, using the Standard paintings as subject, and of the same dimensions and use of blocks. In 2013, Uglow's work was shown posthumously in New York City, in a solo exhibition, at David Zwirner, curated by Bob Nickas (with catalogue). In 2014, MIT List Visual Arts Center, (Cambridge, MA), held an exhibition of Uglow’s Standards and Portraits, curated by João Ribas.

From the 1970s onwards, Uglow was included in numerous group shows in galleries and museums in the United States and Europe.

Europe and Scandinavia

Alan Uglow’s first one-person show, outside the United States, was in 1983 at Galerie Nordenhake, founded by Claes Nordenhake, in Malmö, Sweden. Uglow continued to show with the gallery in Malmö and Stockholm, and in Berlin, Germany; his final show with Galerie Nordenhake was in 2006, in Berlin.

In 1984, Uglow showed “Signal,” a structured, two-part painting, as well as one other discrete painting, at Gunther Umberg's Raum für Malerai (Room for Painting), Cologne, Germany.

Beginning in 1988 through 2010, Uglow had an extended professional and personal relationship with Milco Onrust (1961–2015) and Boudi Eskens—who joined the gallery in 1992—showing initially with Galeri Onrust on the Prinsengracht and later in their space on Planciusstraat, Amsterdam, NL.

*In 1986, 1992, and part of 1993, Uglow and his wife, the poet and writer Elena Alexander, lived in Cologne, Germany.
