= Ralph Humphrey =

American painter

- Born: Ralph Humphrey; April 14, 1932; Youngstown, Ohio, U.S.
- Died: July 14, 1990 (aged 58); New York, New York, U.S.
- Education: Youngstown State University
- Known for: Painting
- Movement: Abstract expressionism Minimalism

Ralph Humphrey (April 14, 1932 – July 14, 1990) was an American abstract painter whose work has been linked to both Abstract Expressionism and Minimalism. He was active in the New York art scene in the 1960s and '70s. His paintings are best summarized as an exploration of space through color and structure. He lived and worked in New York, NY.

He is not to be confused with the percussionist Ralph Humphrey, best known for being the drummer of The Mothers of Invention from 1973 until 1974.

== Biography ==
Ralph Humphrey studied at Youngstown State University. He moved to New York in 1957 and immediately became a part of the art scene that was known, at the time, for Abstract Expressionism. He met artists such as Mark Rothko, Theodoros Stamos, Frank Stella, Robert Ryman, and Ellsworth Kelly, who would end up having a large influence on his work. Humphrey was a prominent member of the generation of artists who laid the groundwork for American art in the 1970s and 60s. From 1966 until his death in 1990, he taught painting in the graduate department at Hunter College.

== Artistic style ==
Humphrey's artistic style went through several phases and developments, which can be roughly outlined in the following way: monochromes from 1957 to 1960; frame paintings 1961–65; shaped canvases 1967–70; constructed paintings 1971–1990. Throughout these phases, Humphrey kept a keen eye on color, light, and space while he moved between abstraction and representation. As Kenneth Baker explains in Art in America in 1984, “Each of his works defines an ideal viewing distance that can be discovered only by patient observation of the focus of the details, the resolution of the image and the proper relationship between body and object. Finding the apt distance from which to contemplate Humphrey’s new paints is thus not something you do discursively: it is an exercise in feeling your way silently towards a correct spatial interval.”

=== 1957–1960 ===
Reviewing Humphrey's show at Tibor de Nagy in 1960, Donald Judd said, of his monochromes, “They are large, subtle and single-colored. This is Purism of a sort, in which generality does not contain variables but excludes them, in which the basic diagram or color, the only continuity, is exposed, here the essence of a confused sequence of perceptions.” Donald Judd also likened these canvases to the work of Kazimir Malevich, Piet Mondrian, and Josef Albers.

=== 1961–1965 ===
Neil A. Levine wrote in 1965 about Humphrey's solo exhibition at Green Gallery, where he showed some of his frame paintings. Levine said, “His new work is serious and demanding. All the paintings are variations on one theme. The theme is, simply stated, an expansive, lightly brushed, large grey field…surrounded by a painted framing edge…” Here, Neil, too, references Albers, as well as TV screens, unfilled billboards, and Rothko.

=== 1967–1970 ===
Robert Pincus-Whitten reviewed Humphrey's 1969 show at Bykert Gallery, where his shaped canvases were hung. Pincus-Whitten explains how Humphrey created “a luminous cosmos of fragile exhalations, painted on large squares or horizontal rectangles, softly turned at the corner and curved back into the stretcher.” These canvases are noteworthy, too, for their use of day-glow colors. At this time, his work becomes increasingly more atmospheric than his previous efforts; multi-colored wavy lines and sprayed colors replace solid geometric fields of single colors.

=== 1971–1990 ===
The last definable phase of his artistic style approaches representation at times, sometimes calling to mind an open window. These constructed paintings also border on sculpture, often coming ten inches out from the wall, directly confronting the viewer in real space. The paint, too, is considerably built up, giving the surface of the paintings considerable texture that was not previously seen in his work. Ellen Schwartz writes in 1977 about his show at John Weber, where his constructed paintings were still abstract: “Humphrey’s latest works, meditative rather than communicative, require the suspension of conscious efforts to grasp them before they will yield their secrets, which lay within ourselves all the while. The rich blue variegated surfaces are like blotters onto which we pour our own fantasies.” D Phillips, writing about his Willard Gallery show in 1982, explains how his constructed paintings are natural extensions of the earlier frame paintings: “Frames-within-frames have long provided the structural basis for Humphrey’s colorful designs; he has simply made his window allusion literal.” She explains, too, that these paintings are a step forward: “The shift does, however, bring greater variety and complexity to the artist’s constructions. There is a more explicit sense of space, of indoors and outdoors.” Beyond content, we see Humphrey using a brighter color palette and inserting vaguely figurative, whimsical patterns onto the surface. Yet, by the mid-1980s, the paintings return to a more ambiguous, abstract state.

== Exhibitions ==
Since his first solo exhibition at the Tibor de Nagy Gallery in New York City in 1959, Humphrey's work has been the subject of 40 solo shows. During his lifetime, he had been represented by Green Gallery, Bykert Gallery, Andre Emmerich Gallery, Willard Gallery, and John Weber Gallery.

Solo exhibitions have continued to be mounted since his death in 1990, including Ralph Humphrey: Frame Paintings, 1964 to 1965 at Mary Boone Gallery, New York City, September 8–October 6, 1990 and Ralph Humphrey: Conveyance at Gary Snyder Gallery, April 2 – May 16, 2015. Other exhibitions have been held elsewhere in New York, San Francisco, Los Angeles, and Boston.

Humphrey's paintings have also been in group shows such as Systemic Painting at the Solomon R. Guggenheim Museum, New York, 1966, The Structure of Color at the Whitney Museum of American Art, New York, 1971, the 1979 Biennial at the Whitney Museum, and High Times, Hard Times: New York Painting, 1967–1975 at the Weatherspoon Art Museum, 2006.

=== Solo exhibitions ===
1959

- Ralph Humphrey, Tibor de Nagy Gallery, New York, February 3–21

1960

- Ralph Humphrey, Tibor de Nagy Gallery, New York, February 2–21

1961

- Ralph Humphrey: Recent Paintings, Mayer Gallery, New York, March 14 – April 1

1965

- Ralph Humphrey, Green Gallery, New York, May 5–29

1967

- Ralph Humphrey, Bykert Gallery, New York, January 10 – February 24

1968

- Ralph Humphrey, Bykert Gallery, New York, February 3–29

1969

- Ralph Humphrey, Bykert Gallery, New York, February 1–27 Galerie Alfred Schmela, Düsseldorf

1970

- Ralph Humphrey, Bykert Gallery, New York, April 4–25

1971

- Ralph Humphrey, André Emmerich Gallery, New York, March 20 – April 8

1972

- Ralph Humphrey, Bykert Gallery, New York, May 2–23

1973

- Ralph Humphrey, Bykert Gallery, New York, May 12 – June 2
- Ralph Humphrey: Survey of Paintings, Texas Gallery, Houston, May 15 – June 9

1974

- Ralph Humphrey, Bykert Gallery, New York, April 20 – May 15
- Ralph Humphrey: Paintings, Daniel Weinberg Gallery, San Francisco, November–December

1975

- Ralph Humphrey: Paintings, 1974, Bykert Gallery, New York, February 4–26
- Ralph Humphrey: Paintings, 1958–1966, Bykert/ Downtown, New York, February 4–26

1976

- Ralph Humphrey, John Weber Gallery, New York, January 31 – February 25

1976–1977

- Ralph Humphrey: Recent Paintings, Daniel Weinberg Gallery, San Francisco, December 16, 1976 – January 22, 1977

1977

- Ralph Humphrey, John Weber Gallery, New York, February 9–26

1980

- Ralph Humphrey, Willard Gallery, New York, April 5 – May 7

1982

- Ralph Humphrey, Willard Gallery, New York, April 3–May 8
- Ralph Humphrey: Paintings, 1975–1982, Daniel Weinberg Gallery, Los Angeles, October 6–30

1983

- Ralph Humphrey: Selected Paintings, Daniel Weinberg Gallery, Los Angeles, May 14 – June 11

1984

- Delahunty Gallery, Dallas
- Ralph Humphrey, Willard Gallery, New York, April 7 – May 12

1985

- Ralph Humphrey: Recent Paintings, Daniel Weinberg Gallery, Los Angeles, October 16 – November 2

1987

- Ralph Humphrey, Jay Gorney Modern Art, New York, January–February

1990

- Ralph Humphrey: 1990, Mary Boone Gallery, New York, March 3–31
- Ralph Humphrey: Frame Paintings, 1964 to 1965, Mary Boone Gallery, New York, September 8–October 6
- Ralph Humphrey: A Retrospective View, 1954–1990, Daniel Weinberg Gallery, Los Angeles, November 8– December 5

1991

- Ralph Humphrey: The Late Paintings on Paper, Bertha and Karl Leubsdorf Art Gallery, Hunter College, City University of New York, September 19 – October 26
- Ralph Humphrey: Paintings, 1975–1985, John Berggruen Gallery, San Francisco, October–November

1996

- Ralph Humphrey: Selected Paintings, Daniel Weinberg Gallery, San Francisco, August 17 – October 17

1998

- Ralph Humphrey, Danese Gallery, New York, January 16 – February 14

2000

- Ralph Humphrey: Early Paintings, 1957–1967, Daniel Weinberg Gallery, Los Angeles, November 1 – December 9

2001

- Ralph Humphrey: Later Paintings, 1975–1982, Daniel Weinberg Gallery, Los Angeles, April 5 – May 26

2008

- Ralph Humphrey: Selected Works from the Estate, Nielsen Gallery, Boston, May 17 – June 14
- Ralph Humphrey: Selected Paintings, 1957–1980, Daniel Weinberg Gallery, Los Angeles, May 31 – June 28

2012

- Ralph Humphrey, Gary Snyder Gallery, New York, September 13 – October 27

2015

- Ralph Humphrey: Conveyance, Garth Greenan Gallery, New York, April 2–May 16

=== Group exhibitions ===
1961

- American Abstract Expressionists and Imagists, Solomon R. Guggenheim Museum, New York, October–December

1966

- Systemic Painting, Solomon R. Guggenheim Museum, New York, September–November

1967

- Selected N.Y.C. Artists 1967, Ithaca College Museum of Art, Ithaca, New York, April 4 – May 27
- Focus on Light, New Jersey State Museum, Trenton, May 20 – September 10
- Highlights of the 1966–1967 Art Season, Aldrich Museum of Contemporary Art, Ridgefield, Connecticut, June 18 – September 4
- A Romantic Minimalism, Institute of Contemporary Art, Philadelphia September 13 – October 11

1968

- Bykert Gallery, New York
- The Art of the Real: USA, 1948–1968, Museum of Modern Art, New York, July 3 – September 8

1968–1969

- The Pure and Clear: American Innovations, Philadelphia Museum of Art, November 13, 1968 – January 21, 1969

1969

- American Painting: The 1960s, Georgia Museum of Art, University of Georgia, Athens, September 22– November 8
- Current Minimal Painting, Vassar College Art Gallery, Poughkeepsie, New York

1969–1970

- 1969 Annual Exhibition: Contemporary American Painting, Whitney Museum of American Art, New York, December 16, 1969 – February 1, 1970

1970–1971

- Color and Field, 1890–1970, Albright-Knox Art Gallery, Buffalo, September 15 – November 1, 1970; Dayton Art Institute, Ohio, November 20, 1970 – January 10, 1971; Cleveland Museum of Art, February 4–March 28, 1971

1971

- The Structure of Color, Whitney Museum of American Art, New York, February 25 – April 18
- Spray, Santa Barbara Museum of Art, California, April 24–May 30
- Bykert Gallery, New York
- Art of the Decade, 1960–1970: Paintings from the Collections of Greater Detroit, University Art Gallery, Oakland University, Rochester, Michigan, November 14–December 17

1972

- Painting and Sculpture Today, Indianapolis Museum of Art, April 26 – June 4
- Current American Abstract Painting, Vassar College Art Gallery, Poughkeepsie, New York
- Dealers’ Choice, La Jolla Museum of Contemporary Art, California, July 15–September 27

1973

- Drawings, Bykert Gallery, New York, January 6–24
- Gallery Toselli, Milan

1974

- New Painting: Stressing Surface, Katonah Gallery, Katonah, New York, May 4 – June 23
- Painting and Sculpture Today, Indianapolis Museum of Art, May 22 – July 14; Taft Museum of Art, Cincinnati, September 12–October 24
- Ten Painters in New York, Michael Walls Gallery, New York, June 15 – July 6
- Seventy-First American Exhibition, Art Institute of Chicago, June 15 – August 11

1975

- 22 Artists, Susan Caldwell Gallery, New York, January 4–25
- Fourteen Abstract Painters, Frederick S. Wight Art Gallery, University of California, Los Angeles, March 25 – May 25
- Fourteen Artists, Baltimore Museum of Art, April 15 – June 1
- A Group Show Selected by Klaus Kertess, Texas Gallery, Houston, September 15 – October 11
- Douglas Drake Gallery, Kansas City, Missouri

1975–1976

- Painting, Drawing, and Sculpture of the ’60s and ’70s from the Dorothy and Herbert Vogel Collection, Institute of Contemporary Art, Philadelphia, October 7–November 18, 1975; Contemporary Arts Center, Cincinnati, December 17, 1975 – February 15, 1976

1976

- Ideas on Paper: 1970–1976, Renaissance Society at the University of Chicago, May 2 – June 6
- Daniel Weinberg Gallery, San Francisco

1977

- Paintings on Paper, Drawing Center, New York, January 15–26
- Galerie Jean-Paul Najar, Paris
- ’75, ’76, ’77: Painting, Part I, Sarah Lawrence College Art Gallery, Bronxville, New York, February 19–March 10; American Foundation for the Arts, Miami, April–May; Contemporary Arts Center, Cincinnati, June–July
- A View of a Decade, Museum of Contemporary Art, Chicago, September 10–November 10
- John Weber Gallery, New York

1977–1978

- Works from the Collection of Dorothy and Herbert Vogel, University of Michigan Museum of Art, Ann Arbor, November 11, 1977 – January 1, 1978

1978–1979

- Late Twentieth Century Art from the Sydney and Frances Lewis Foundation, Anderson Gallery, Virginia Commonwealth University, Richmond, December 5, 1978 – January 9, 1979; Institute of Contemporary Art, University of Pennsylvania, Philadelphia, *March 22 – May 2, 1979

1979

- 1979 Biennial Exhibition, Whitney Museum of American Art, New York, February 6–April 1
- Generation, Susan Caldwell Gallery, New York
- The Reductive Object: A Survey of the Minimalist Aesthetic in the 1960s, Institute of Contemporary Art, Boston, March 7 – April 29
- The Implicit Image: Abstract Painting in the ’70s, Nielsen Gallery, Boston, April 29 – June 1
- Color and Structure, Hamilton Gallery, New York, May 5 – June 2
- Texas Gallery, Houston

1980

- Black, White, Other, R.H. Oosterom Gallery, New York, January 17 – February 17
- Current/New York: Recent Works in Relief, Joe and Emily Lowe Art Gallery, Syracuse University, Syracuse, New York, January 27–February 24
- Painting in Relief, Whitney Museum of American Art, Downtown Branch, New York, January 30 – March 5
- Painting and Sculpture Today, Indianapolis Museum of Art, June 24 – August 17
- 3 Dimensional Painting, Museum of Contemporary Art, Chicago, August 2 – November 9
- Planar Painting: Constructs, 1975–1980, The Alternative Museum, New York, October 18–November 15, 1980
- The Image Transformed, Art Latitude Gallery, New York, November 4–29

1981

- A Seventies Selection: An Exhibition of Works from the Collection of the Whitney Museum of American Art, Miami University Art Museum, Oxford, Ohio, February 14 – June 14
- Abstract Mythologies, Nielsen Gallery, Boston, March 1–31
- Between Painting and Sculpture, Pam Adler Gallery, New York, March 31 – April 25

1981–1982

- Drawing Invitational 1981, Harm Bouckaert Gallery, New York, December 2, 1981 – January 2, 1982

1982

- The Erotic Impulse, Roger Litz Gallery, New York
- Postminimalism, Aldrich Museum of Contemporary Art, Ridgefield, Connecticut, September 19–December 19

1983

- Abstract Painting: 1960–1969, P.S. 1 Contemporary Art Center, Queens, January 16 – March 13
- New Work, New York: Newcastle Salutes New York, Newcastle Polytechnic Gallery, Newcastle upon Tyne, United Kingdom, October 8–November 4

1984

- Parasol and Simca: Two Presses/Two Processes, Center Gallery, Bucknell University, Lewisburg, Pennsylvania, February 3–April 4, 1984; Sordoni Art Gallery, Wilkes College, Wilkes-Barre, Pennsylvania, April 15–May 13
- The Meditative Surface, Renaissance Society at the University of Chicago, April 1 – May 16

1985

- Abstract Painting Redefined, Louis K. Meisel Gallery, New York, February 16 – March 30
- Now and Then: A Selection of Recent and Earlier Paintings, Daniel Weinberg Gallery, Los Angeles, June 1 – August 31
- American Abstract Painting: 1960–1980, Margo Leavin Gallery, Los Angeles, June 19 – August 24

1986

- The Purist Image, Marian Locks Gallery, Philadelphia, November

1986–1987

- The Window in Twentieth-Century Art, Neuberger Museum of Art, Purchase College, State University of New York, September 21, 1986 – January 18, 1987; Contemporary Arts Museum, Houston, April 24– June 29, 1987

1997

- A Lasting Legacy: Selections from the Lannan Foundation Gift, Museum of Contemporary Art, Los Angeles, September 9–December 14

2004

- A Minimal Future?: Art as Object, 1958–1968, Museum of Contemporary Art, Los Angeles, March 28 – July 26

2006–2007

- High Times, Hard Times: New York Painting, 1967–1975, Weatherspoon Art Museum, University of North Carolina, Greensboro, August 6–October 15, 2006; American University Museum at the Katzen Arts Center, American University, Washington, D.C., November 21, 2006 – January 21, 2007; National Academy Museum and School, New York, February 13 – April 27, 2007

2008

- The Idea of Nature, 33 Bond Gallery, New York, June 12–July 31
- Into the Void: Abstract Art, 1948–2008, Tucson Museum of Art, July 17–September 26

2008–2009

- Steve DiBenedetto, Ralph Humphrey, Chris Martin, and Andrew Masullo/Paintings, Daniel Weinberg Gallery, Los Angeles, December 6, 2008 – January 31, 2009

2009

- Image Matter, Mary Boone Gallery, New York, February 21 – March 28
- Not New: Vincent Fecteau Selects from the Collection, San Francisco Museum of Modern Art, July 25 – November 8

2010

- Wall-to-Wall, Daniel Weinberg Gallery, Los Angeles, June 5 – August 14

2011

- Surface Truths: Abstract Painting in the Sixties, Norton Simon Museum, Pasadena, California, March 25 – August 15

2011–2012

- The Language of Less: Then and Now, Museum of Contemporary Art, Chicago, October 8, 2011 – April 8, 2012

2012

- Susan Hartnett, Ralph Humphrey, Marilyn Lerner, and Dona Nelson, Mary Boone Gallery, New York, March 22 – April 28

2014–2015

- The Avant-Garde Collection, Orange County Museum of Art, Newport Beach, California, September 7, 2014 – January 4, 2015

2015

- Pretty Raw: After and Around Helen Frankenthaler, Rose Art Museum, Brandeis University, Waltham, Massachusetts, February 11 – June 7, 2015

== Collections ==
Humphrey's work can be found in prominent collections in America and Australia, including the following:

- Addison Gallery of American Art
- Allen Memorial Art Museum
- Art Institute of Chicago
- Butler Institute of American Art
- Carnegie Museum of Art
- Dayton Art Institute
- Museum of Contemporary Art, Chicago
- Museum of Contemporary Art, Los Angeles
- Museum of Contemporary Art, San Diego
- Museum of Fine Arts, Boston
- Museum of Fine Arts, Houston
- Museum of Modern Art
- National Gallery of Australia
- Norton Simon Museum
- Oklahoma City Museum of Art
- Orange County Museum of Art
- Palm Springs Art Museum
- Parrish Art Museum
- Pérez Art Museum Miami
- Philadelphia Museum of Art
- Rose Art Museum
- San Francisco Museum of Modern Art
- Smithsonian American Art Museum
- Tucson Museum of Art
- Virginia Museum of Fine Arts
- Walker Art Center
- Weatherspoon Art Museum
- Whitney Museum of American Art
