= Richard Van Buren =

American sculptor and painter (born 1937)

- Born: Richard Van Buren; August 5, 1937; Syracuse, New York
- Education: San Francisco State University and National University of Mexico
- Known for: Sculpture, Painting
- Movement: Postminimalism

Richard Van Buren (born 5 August 1937 in Syracuse, New York) is an American sculptor and painter. He is an artist who, throughout his lifetime, has tested the boundaries of what sculpture should look like. He was quite active in the New York art world in the 1960s and 1970s, and still continues his art-making practices, though he now lives in Maine. His sculptures and works on paper are best summarized by experimentation between the limits of natural/organic and the man-made/inorganic materials; and he often combines the two in combinations that evoke light and contradict our assumptions.

== Biography ==
Van Buren first studied painting at sculpture at San Francisco State University and the National University of Mexico. While still a student, he began exhibiting in galleries who showed works by his contemporaries, Franz Kline, H.C. Westermann, Ron Nagle, Ed Moses, and Robert Morris. Eventually, he relocated to New York in 1964, where he stayed for over twenty years teaching at the School of Visual Arts and the Parsons School of Design, while also becoming deeply engrained in the contemporary art scene. His colleagues were famous sculptors such as Eva Hesse, Lynda Benglis, and Richard Serra.

== Artistic style ==
Richard Van Buren has displayed a career-long fascination with materials. He often makes use of dry pigment, costume jewelry, fiberglass, wallpaper paste, and glitter simultaneously. His forms are often inconsistent and biomorphic, making use of man-made materials while forming biomorphic constructions.

== Exhibitions ==
He began exhibiting with a solo exhibition in 1961 at New Mission Gallery, San Francisco, and has held solo exhibitions at Bykert Gallery, New York; Paula Cooper Gallery, New York; Graduate Center Mall, City University of New York; Mitchell Algus Gallery, New York; Grand Arts, Kansas City, Missouri; Tides Institute and Museum of Art, Eastport, Maine; Garth Greenan Gallery, New York; and the South Dakota Art Museum, South Dakota State University, Brookings. He was included in group exhibitions at The Jewish Museum, New York; Institute of Contemporary Art, University of Pennsylvania, Philadelphia; Aldrich Museum of Contemporary Art, Ridgefield, Connecticut; Whitney Museum of American Art; Albright-Knox Art Gallery, Buffalo; Art in General, New York; Museum of Fine Arts, Boston; Museum of Contemporary Art, Los Angeles; and the National Gallery of Australia, Canberra.

== Collections ==
- American Academy of Arts and Letters, New York
- Art Institute of Chicago
- Bennington College, Bennington, Vermont
- Miami-Dade Art in Public Places
- Museum of Contemporary Art, San Diego
- Museum of Fine Arts, Boston
- Museum of Modern Art, New York
- National Gallery of Art, Washington, D.C.
- National Gallery of Australia, Canberra
- Purdue University, Lafayette, Indiana
- Philadelphia Museum of Art
- San Francisco Museum of Modern Art
- Smithsonian American Art Museum, Washington, D.C.
- Virginia Museum of Fine Arts, Richmond
- Walker Art Center, Minneapolis
