= Tarek Atoui =

Lebanonese French artist

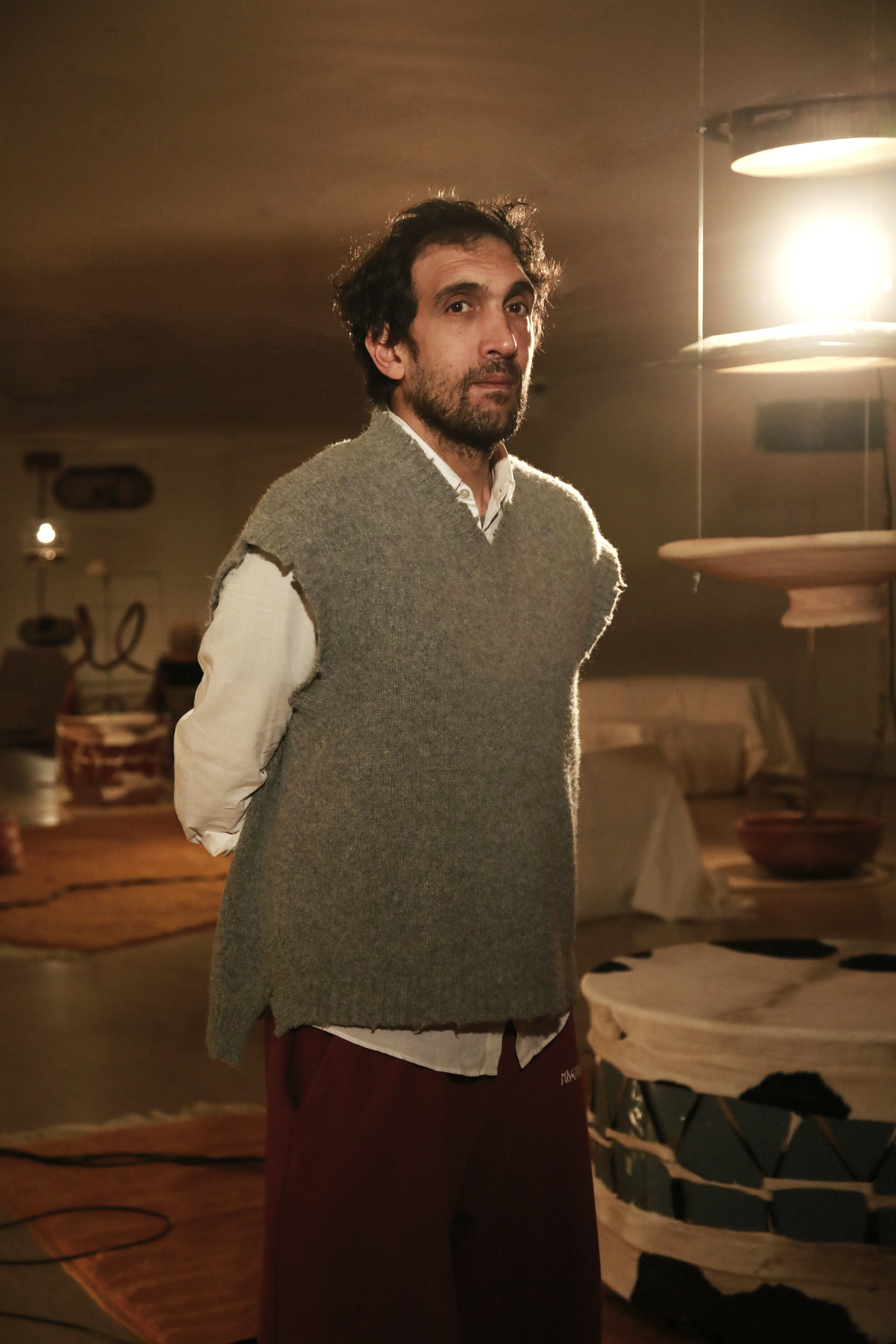
Tarek Atoui in 2025

Tarek Atoui (born 1980) is a Lebanese contemporary artist and composer.

== Biography ==
Tarek Atoui was born in Beirut, Lebanon in 1980. At the age of 18, in 1998, he started composing electronic music and moved to France. In 2007, he worked as an artistic director at STEIM in Amsterdam. Later, in 2010, he performed his first solo exhibition, titled Un-drum 3, where he used his own body efforts to trigger sound effects. He has been involved in Dalem Museum, Tate Modern and Singapore.

== Selected works ==
=== The Reverse Collection (2014 - 2016) ===
The Reverse Collection is an ensemble of instruments that has been conceived in several steps. The project started with the Dahlem Sessions during the 8th Berlin Biennale in 2014, when Atoui invited musicians to improvise on historical instruments from the collection of the ethnological museum in Berlin. Next, the recordings from these performances were passed on to instrument makers to develop new instruments that would allow the recreation of these sounds. Eight instruments were constructed and exhibited in Mexico City at kurimanzutto in 2014, resulting in several performances and new compositions, called the Reverse Sessions. The third and last step was presented as Reverse Collection in 2016 at Tate Modern in London with a new generation of ten instruments. The collection was activated in several performances which Atoui recorded. It was completed by a multichannel sound work in the exhibition space that was evolving over the whole duration of the show and allowing multiple associations between object, sound, space and performance. In an interview with Nadine Khalil for Ocula Magazine, the artist described how the work was involved 'with how objects, shapes, and functions could change with oral transmission.'

=== WITHIN (2016) ===
For his project WITHIN, Tarek Atoui has been working with people who are deaf and hard of hearing since 2012. The project aims to explore the modes of tactile, physical, gestural and visual sound perception, and develop instruments that can be played by deaf as well as by hearing people.

WITHIN questions the act of listening and the way instruments are built, conduct composition and improvisation, write scores and relate to an audience. The project was initiated in 2012 and has since then been enriched by the contribution of the curatorial duo Council. WITHIN evolved at the Sharjah Biennale (2013), the Berkeley Art Museum, the Experimental Music and Performing Art Center - New York (2015), ZKM - Karlsruhe (2016), the Bergen Assembly (2016), the Galerie Chantal Crousel - Paris (2017), Garage - Moscow (2018), the Favoriten Festival - Dortmund (2018), and the Printemps de Septembre - Toulouse (2018).

The resulting collection of instruments that has been developed in collaboration with deaf and non-deaf students and volunteers, instrument makers, software engineers, speaker designers, and art educators can be activated in workshops, rehearsals and performances, but also as sound installation replaying some of the past performance recordings and offering new sounds methods of apprehending sound.

=== The Ground (2017 - ongoing) ===
The Ground is the result of Tarek Atoui's trips and investigations over a period of 5 years around the agricultural environment of Pearl River Delta (Guangdong, China). This research resulted, in collaboration with musicians and instrument makers, in a series of instruments presented at Mirrored Gardens (Guangzhou, China) in 2017. Each instrument has its own approach of being activated and all together they can be played autonomously in different sound situations to be experienced individually by each listener.

Each presentation of The Ground is punctuated with invitations to musicians and composers to activate and play the instruments in an experimental conversation to find new musical gestures and enrich the soundscape. In 2018 the project was presented in the exhibition The Ground, from the Land to the Sea at the NTU CCA Singapore. At this occasion a new series of porcelain and ceramic discs were created. The exhibition also featured selected instruments from the Reverse Collection and WITHIN. Additionally, the presentation in Singapore offered the opportunity for Tarek Atoui to complete his sound collection I/E with recordings of the Singapore shores, local harbors and waterfronts in cooperation with Éric La Casa, composer and sound artist. In 2019 The Ground is presented at the 58th Venice Biennale, in the International Art Exhibition May You Live in Interesting Times. For this exhibition, the instruments play autonomously in a composition constantly fed by their own sounds and vibrations, creating immersive soundscapes and engaging the act of listening.

=== Water's Witness (2023 - 2024) ===
In late 2023, Atoui held a presentation at Museum of Contemporary Art Australia in Sydney, Australia. The art installation featured sculptures in conjunction with multiple sounds and recordings to create an interlinked relationship between sound and history. Sounds of the sea and underwater sounds were recorded by field specialists, musicians such as Chris Watson and Éric La Casa.

"The exhibition was accompanied by a new publication designed by Goda Budvytytė and published by the MCA Australia. The fourth in a series documenting Waters’ Witness, the publication is created with Atoui’s long-term collaborator, Alexandre Guirkinger, and incorporates an evocative photo essay by the French photographer, as well as a foreword by MCA Australia Director Suzanne Cotter". The sandstone sculptures and sea sounds were inspired by Australian nature, specifically by the Port Botany area and Sydney Harbour. The aim of the presentation was to showcase the connection between industrialization, nature and society.

== Selected exhibitions ==
- Un-drum 1, Sharjah Biennial 9, Sharjah, U.A.E. (2009)
- Visiting Tarab, Performa Biennial 11 (2011)
- dOCUMENTA 13, commission and residency for developing the Metastable Circuit, la Lutherie and Dimis Reconnected, Kassel, Germany. (2012)
- From Architecture. Quatre variations and Le Diapason à réponse infinie Fondation Louis Vuitton, Paris, France. (2014, 2015)
- The Reverse Sessions, Kurimanzutto Gallery, Mexico City, Mexico. (2014)
  - The Reverse Collection, Tate Modern, London, U.K. (2016)
- WITHIN, first presented at the Sharjah Biennial 11 (2013), later made part of the Council art organization's Infinite Ear project. (2016)
- The Ground, Mirrored Gardens, Guangzhou, China. (2017)
  - The Ground: From the Land to the Sea, NTU Centre for Contemporary Art Singapore (2018).
  - The Ground, at the International Art Exhibition entitled May You Live In Interesting Times, 58th edition of the Venice Biennale (2019).
- Waters’ Witness, September 15, 2023–February 4, 2024, Sydney, Australia (Museum of Contemporary Art Australia).
