= Klaus Kertess =

Klaus Kertess (July 16, 1940, New York City – October 8, 2016, New York City) was an American art gallerist, art critic and curator (including of the 1995 Whitney Biennial). He grew up in Westchester County north of New York City, the second of three children. After graduating from Phillips Academy, he studied art history at Yale University and in 1966 founded the Bykert Gallery with his college roommate Jeff Byers. The gallery name was formed from a compound of both of theirs. At Bykert he showed a roster of artists which included; Brice Marden, David Novros, Barry Le Va, Alan Saret, Chuck Close, Bill Bollinger, Dorothea Rockburne, and many others.

Later as an independent curator he oversaw the 1995 edition of the Whitney Biennial. Then in 1998 he curated the exhibition DeKooning: Drawing/Seeing at the Drawing Center also in New York City. He was in a relationship with painter Billy Sullivan for most of his adult life.

Kertess suffered from Alzheimer's and died on October 8, 2016, after collapsing at his apartment. He was 76.
