= Process art =

Art movement

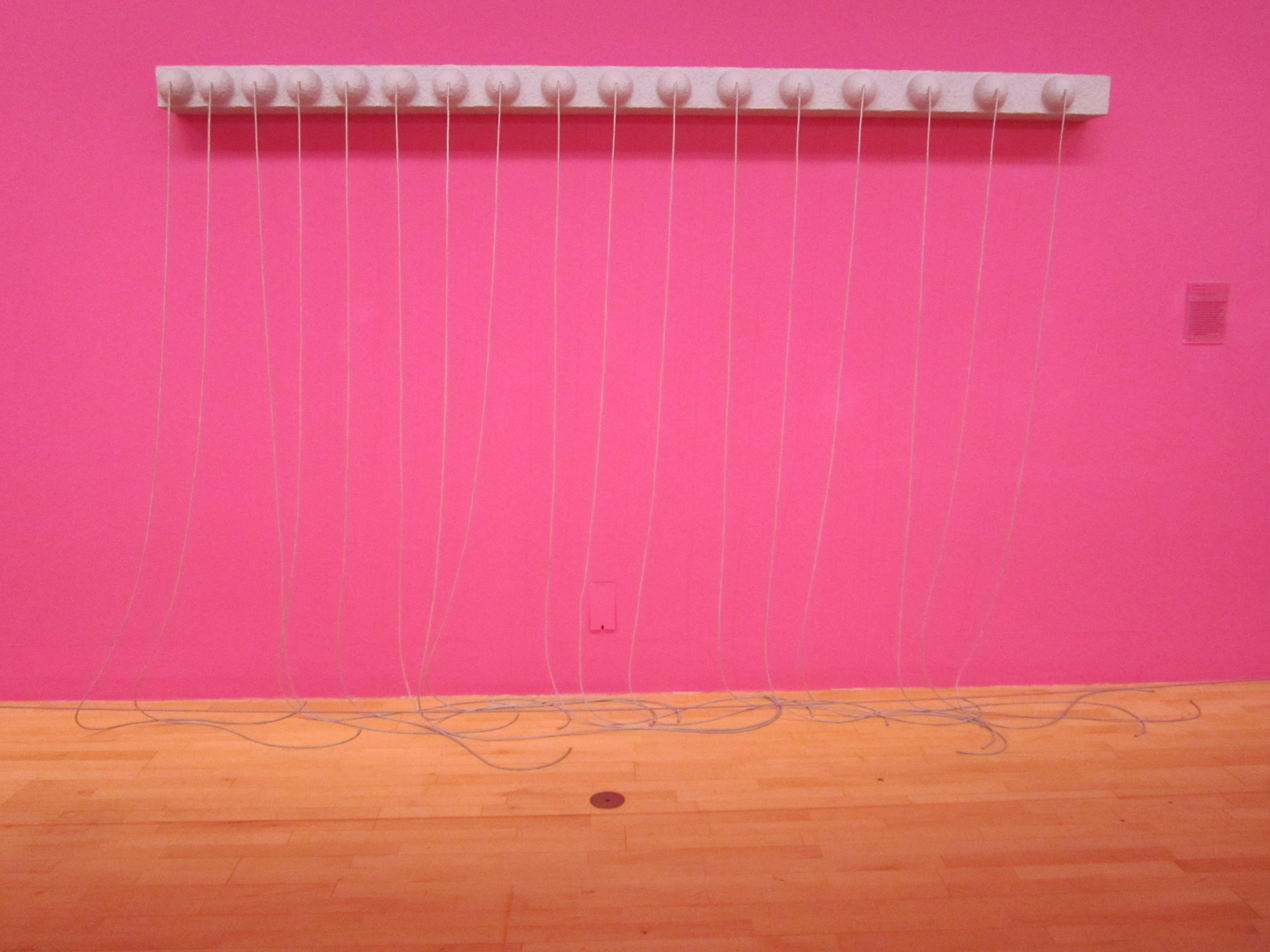
Addendum by Eva Hesse, Tate Liverpool

Process art is an artistic movement where the end product of art and craft, the objet d’art (work of art/found object), is not the principal focus; the process of its making is one of the most relevant aspects if not the most important one: the gathering, sorting, collating, associating, patterning, and moreover the initiation of actions and proceedings. Process artists saw art as humans partnering with intrinsic material expression. Process art is primarily interested in demonstrating forces on matter and defends the idea that the process of creating the work of art can be an art piece itself. Artist Robert Morris refers to the artistic approach as “anti-form”, meaning there is no inherent relation to the physical object.

== History & Movement ==
Process art has been marked as a creative movement in the United States and Europe in the mid-1960s, formed in response to Minimalist art. In general, process artists rejected the idea of a simple, finished piece, and focused more on the artistic process itself. One of its primary influences was Jackson Pollock’s drip painting technique, which involved flinging paint onto a horizontal surface, covering the entire canvas and using the full force of his body to paint. Privileging such instances of indeterminacy in pursuit of change and transience, Process artists also draw influence from performance art and the Dada movement. In 1968, Robert Morris had a groundbreaking exhibition in the Guggenheim Museum, which accompanied an essay defining process art. The Museum website states:

Process Artists were involved in issues attendant to the body, random occurrences, improvisation, and the liberating qualities of nontraditional materials such as wax, felt, and latex. Using these, they created eccentric forms in erratic or irregular arrangements produced by actions such as cutting, hanging, and dropping, or organic processes such as growth, condensation, freezing, or decomposition.

The process art movement and the environmental art movement are directly related. As written on the Art and Culture website:

Process Artists engage the primacy of organic systems, using perishable, insubstantial, and transitory materials such as dead rabbits, steam, fat, ice, cereal, sawdust, and grass. The materials are often left exposed to natural forces: gravity, time, weather, temperature, etc.

In process art, as in the Arte Povera movement, nature itself is lauded as art; the symbolization and representation of nature, often rejected.

=== Relationship to other disciplines and movements ===
Process art shares fundamental features with a number of other fields, including the expressive therapies and transformative arts, both of which pivot around how the creative process of engaging in artistic activities can precipitate personal insight, individual healing, and social change, independent of the perceived value attributed to the object of creation.

Additionally, process art is integral to arts-based research, which uses creative process and artistic expression to investigate subjects that resist description or representation through other modes of inquiry.

== Related Works ==
- Expanded Expansion, by Eva Hesse - Rubber covered cheesecloth hung from fiberglass poles. The width of the poles varies in each installation, exemplifying the process of setting up the installation itself.
- Untitled (Pink felt), by Robert Morris - Pink pieces of felt fabric dropped in a pile on the floor, using gravity as part of the artistic process so as to highlight the randomness of the piece.
- Splash Piece: Casting, by Richard Serra - Early work used rubber, neon, latex, fiberglass, and lead. These works focused on the natural flow of materials and their structure, using techniques such as pouring and splashing to sculpt. His later work consisted of large installations made out of materials such as forged steel and concrete, using shape and scale as a medium.
- Contraband, by Lynda Benglis - Used latex to create an irregular, abstract pour on the ground in order to represent pollution.
- Mattress Piece, by Gary Kuehn - Focused on using tension between forms as a way to challenge the hard-edged minimalism that dominated the 1960s.
- Accumulated Vision, by Barry Le Va - A collection of his work from the 1960s to 2005, utilizing materials including, but not limited to, broken glass, meat cleavers, wool felt, powdered chalk, linseed oil, a typewriter and a gun.
- Art Make-Up, by Bruce Nauman - Video in which the artist slowly covers his face and torso with differently-colored makeup until he evokes the appearance of a negative image. It was planned to be projected on four walls simultaneously, and while this plan wouldn’t come to fruition, it would be revisited in later works.
- Batambang, by Richard Van Buren - Thermoplastic, acrylic paint, and shells. Created in 2010. Questions the direction and limitations of sculpture as a whole.
