= Gary Stephan =

American abstract painter (born 1942)

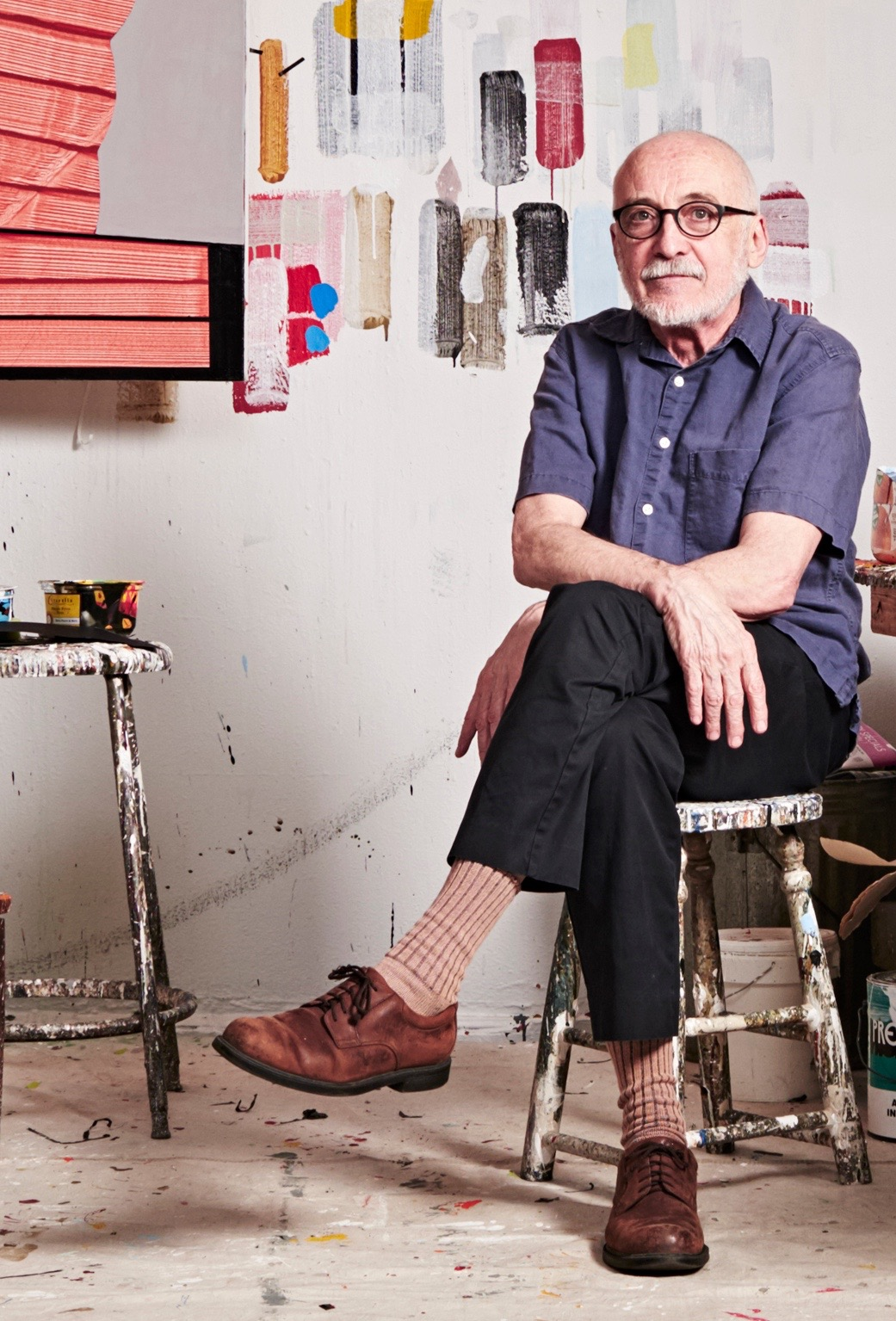
- Born: 1942 (age 83–84); Brooklyn, New York, U.S.
- Known for: Painting

Gary Stephan (born 1942) is an American abstract painter born in Brooklyn who has exhibited his work throughout the United States and Europe.

He lives and works in New York City and Stone Ridge, NY and is on the faculty of the School of Visual Arts MFA program. He is represented by Susan Inglett Gallery in New York City and Devening Projects + Editions in Chicago.

== Education ==
Stephan studied industrial design at Parsons School of Design and at Pratt Institute. In 1965, he moved to San Francisco and received his Master of Fine Arts degree from the San Francisco Art Institute in 1967.

After returning to New York, he was a studio assistant to Jasper Johns until he started showing with the David Whitney Gallery in 1970. This and the Whitney Biennial Exhibitions of 1971 and 1973 were followed by sufficient shows and reviews to prompt Roberta Smith in the New York Times to refer to his work as “among the most closely watched developments of the early ’70s.”

== Work ==
Exhibiting since the late 1960s, Stephan creates Postmodern art in the form of idiosyncraticly abstract paintings, drawings, prints, sculpture, photography and video art.

Gary Stephan, Untitled, 2019, tape on paper, 7 x 7 inches

Stephan builds paintings, abstract in form but pictorial in nature, with a few simple visual tools and colors, which he then uses to undermine a coherent view. Stephan surrounds his marks with shaped areas of negative space that destabilize figure/ground relationships. A color that is used as ground might come to the surface as a positive form. He also uses discontinuous areas of similar color that visually unite to create the impression of a singular shape.

Part of the power of Stephan’s paintings and drawings comes from their engagement with the architecture of their exhibition spaces in ways that mirror their formal structure. Because of their color and facture, some of Stephan’s paintings may seem austere, but merely apprehending their complex formal structure does not settle their meanings. Stephan creates ambiguities of form that summon feelings that are not easily resolved.

As an abstract painter, Stephan has been described as presenting himself as a "rigorous formalist" whose paintings also contain "metaphor-eliciting ambiguities".

== Exhibitions ==
His work has been exhibited at institutions including the Drawing Center, the Metropolitan Museum of Art, the Aldrich Museum of Contemporary Art, and the Whitney Museum.

Stephan has had solo shows in New York at Susan Inglett Gallery, Bykert Gallery, Mary Boone Gallery, Hirschl and Adler, and Marlborough Gallery; in Los Angeles at Margo Leavin Gallery and Daniel Weinberg Gallery.

He had a retrospective exhibition at the Kienzle Art Foundation in Berlin from 13 September 2017 to 13 January 2018.

From 14 May to 4 July 2025 the solo exhibition 'Cohere and Go There' took place at the Thomas Park Gallery in Seoul. The catalogue includes an essay by art critic John Yau, an interview between the artist Tom McGlynn and Gary Stephan, and an afterword by director Mimi Park.

== Awards ==
- American Academy of Arts and Letters
- John Simon Guggenheim Memorial Foundation Fellowship
- National Endowment for the Arts
- The New York Arts Foundation

== Permanent collections ==
- Los Angeles County Museum of Art, Los Angeles, CA
- Museum of Contemporary Art, Los Angeles, Los Angeles, CA
- San Francisco Museum of Modern Art, San Francisco, CA
- Smithsonian American Art Museum, Washington, DC
- Brooklyn Museum, New York, NY
- Solomon R. Guggenheim Museum New York, NY
- The Metropolitan Museum of Art, New York, NY
- Museum of Modern Art, New York, NY
- Whitney Museum of American Art, New York, NY
- Kunst Museum Winterthur, Winterthur, Switzerland

== Bibliography ==
- Gary Stephan: Book of Nine, nine engravings after drawings with nine homographs. New York: The Museum of Modern Art, 1983
- Peter Schjeldahl: Gary Stephan, Same Body Different Day. West Stockbridge MA, 1999
