= Alan Saret =

American artist (1944–2026)

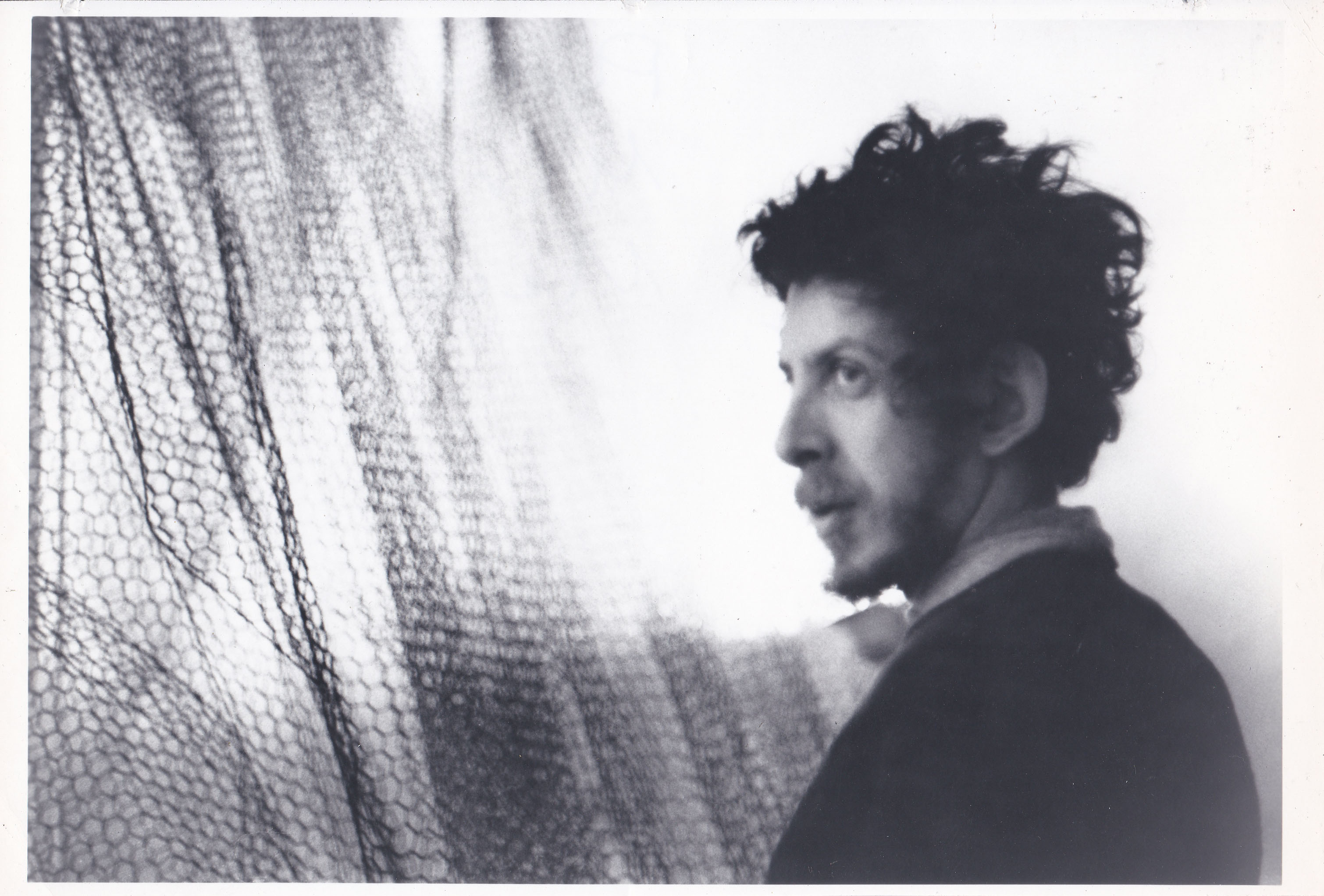
- Born: December 25, 1944; New York City, U.S.
- Died: May 26, 2026 (aged 81); New York City, U.S.
- Known for: Sculpture
- Movement: Postminimalism
- Website: alan-saret.com

Alan Saret (December 25, 1944 – May 26, 2026) was an American sculptor, draftsman and installation artist, best known for his Postminimalist wire sculptures and drawings. He was based in Brooklyn, New York.

== Early life and education ==
Saret was born in New York City on December 25, 1944. He graduated from Cornell University in 1966 with a bachelor's degree in architecture. During post-graduate study at Hunter College from 1966 to 1968, he met sculptor and major Minimalist theorist, Robert Morris, who studied Art History there a few years earlier. As Saret suggested on his website, his connection with Morris inspired a deeper investigation of Minimalism and later Process Art.

== Career ==
Saret was an important figure of the Soho alternative art scene in the late 1960s and 1970s, as well as in the history of systems art, process art, generative art, and post-conceptual art. He lived in India from 1971 to 1974; the metaphysical and spiritual aspects of Indian art and culture inspired his work after his return to the United States. Later, he moved to Harrison, Arkansas, in 1980, before returning to New York in the late 1980s. During this time, Saret removed himself from the commercial art world.

Saret's work is held in the permanent collections of several museums, including the Princeton University Art Museum, the Morgan Library and Museum, the Kemper Art Museum, the University of Michigan Museum of Art, the High Museum of Art, the Brooklyn Museum, the Whitney Museum of American Art, the Metropolitan Museum of Art, the BAMPFA, the Blanton Museum of Art, the Harvard Art Museums, the Herbert F. Johnson Museum of Art, the Denver Art Museum, the Detroit Institute of Arts, the Albright-Knox Art Gallery, the Museum of Contemporary Art Chicago, the Glenstone, the Museum of Contemporary Art, the Saint Louis Art Museum, the Museum of Modern Art, the Art Institute of Chicago, and the Modern Art Museum of Fort Worth.

== Works ==
Saret embraced the response to Minimalism, "anti-form," which embraces non-figurative art in part with the physical characteristics of the material used, in spite of the rigid rules. He also held the opinion that art should have a natural and unbecoming form while keeping a minimal structure. His sculptures were often made with wires of various colors, textures, and thicknesses. Other materials that are common in these sculptures are rubber, mesh, cloth, sulfur, ribbons, and wood. Most, but not all, of his works tend to be installed on the floor or suspended from the ceiling. The names of his pieces suggest themes of nature, with words like "jungle", "autumn," "air," and "forest".

== Death ==
Saret died in New York City on May 26, 2026, at the age of 81.
