= Bergen Assembly =

Art exhibition in Bergen, Norway

Bergen Assembly Bergenstriennalen (Norwegian)
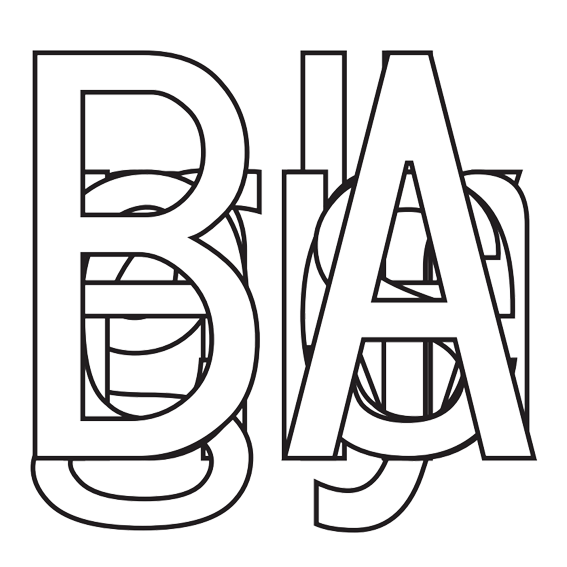

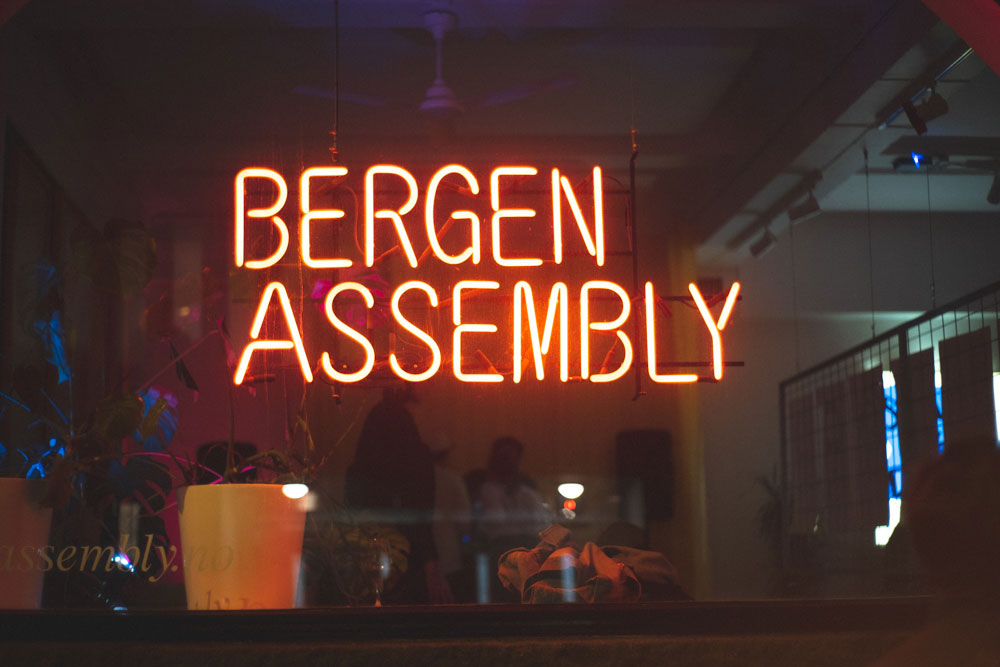
- Genre: Contemporary art triennial
- Frequency: Triennial
- Locations: Bergen, Norway
- Years active: 2013–present
- Inaugurated: 2013
- Founder: Bergen Kunsthall
- Most recent: 2025
- Organiser: Bergen Assembly
- Website: Official website

Bergen Assembly is an international contemporary art triennial held every three years in Bergen, Norway. Founded in 2013, it was established as a platform for artistic research and long-term collaborative processes, positioning itself in contrast to the conventional biennial exhibition model. Each edition is guided by one or more appointed conveners, who determine the curatorial framework and select participating artists and contributors.

== History ==
=== Origins ===
Bergen Assembly originated from the Bergen Biennial Conference, held in 2009, which was initiated in response to a proposal by the Municipality of Bergen to establish an international art biennale in the city. The conference brought together curators, artists, and scholars to debate the question “To biennial or not to biennial?”, critically examining the global proliferation of large-scale periodic exhibitions.

A key outcome of the conference was the publication of The Biennial Reader (Hatje Cantz/Bergen Kunsthall, 2010), an anthology addressing the history, theory, and politics of biennials and recurring exhibition formats.

=== Establishment ===
Following the conference, Bergen Assembly was formally established in 2011 as a triennial event structured around a flexible, convener-led format. The model departed from a fixed curatorial template, instead inviting each convener to rethink the format and organization of the event.

Bergen Assembly operates on a three-year cycle and typically includes exhibitions, performances, talks, publications, workshops, and collaborative research projects. The emphasis is placed on process and inquiry rather than spectacle or scale.

== Previous editions ==
=== Bergen Assembly 2013: Monday Begins on Saturday ===
The first edition of Bergen Assembly, Monday Begins on Saturday, took place in 2013 and was convened by Ekaterina Degot and David Riff. Drawing its title from the novel by Arkady and Boris Strugatsky, the edition took the form of an international exhibition, publication, and symposium presented across multiple venues in Bergen.

=== Bergen Assembly 2016: Tarek Atoui / freethought / PRAXES ===
The second edition of Bergen Assembly was held in 2016 and convened by artist and composer Tarek Atoui, the collective freethought, and the collaborative platform PRAXES. Emphasizing sound-based practices, collective research, and performative formats, the edition foregrounded sensory and participatory modes of engagement.

=== Bergen Assembly 2019: Actually, the Dead Are Not Dead ===
The third edition of Bergen Assembly was titled, Actually, the Dead Are Not Dead, and was held from September to November 2019. It was convened by Iris Dressler and Hans D. Christ. Presented across numerous venues in Bergen, the programme addressed themes of political assembly, ecology, migration, disability, and collective life through exhibitions, public platforms, and educational initiatives.

=== Bergen Assembly 2022: Yasmine and the Seven Faces of the Heptahedron ===
The fourth edition of Bergen Assembly took place from September to November 2022 and was convened by artist Saâdane Afif. Titled Yasmine and the Seven Faces of the Heptahedron, the edition was organized around a fictional narrative involving a curatorial persona and seven character-based exhibitions.

=== Bergen Assembly 2025: across, with, nearby ===
The fifth edition of Bergen Assembly was titled, across, with, nearby (Norwegian: på tvers, med, nær), and was held from September to November 2025. It was convened by Ravi Agarwal, Adania Shibli, and the Bergen School of Architecture. The edition focused on neighbourliness, mutual care, and collective learning in response to social and ecological challenges.

== Organization ==
=== Management ===
Since 2019, Bergen Assembly has been directed by Ingrid Haug Erstad.

=== Advisory board ===
Ina Blom, Maria Hlavajova, Ranjit Hoskote, Solveig Øvstebø, Anselm Franke, Anaïs Tondeur, and Michael Marder.

=== Executive board ===
Stein Olaf Onarheim (chair), Henriette Sölter, Antonio Cataldo, Marit Eikemo, Sveinung Unneland, and Karen Sofie Sørensen.

=== Funding ===
Bergen Assembly is primarily funded through public support, notably from the Municipality of Bergen and Arts Council Norway.

== Reception ==
Critical reception has highlighted the festival’s ambition to rethink exhibition models and its experimental approach, while also noting challenges in presentation and coherence. Frieze emphasized both strengths and limitations of the 2019 edition’s polyphony of voices. Norwegian press commented on the balance between artistic research and exhibition practices.
