= Lynda Benglis =

American sculptor (born 1941)

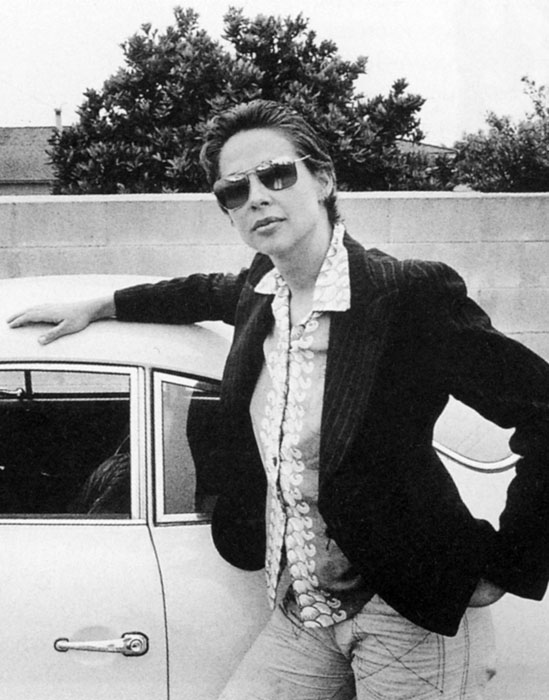
- Benglis in a 1974 photograph
- Born: October 25, 1941 (age 84); Lake Charles, Louisiana, US
- Known for: Sculptor, painter
- Partner: Anand Sarabhai

Lynda Benglis (born October 25, 1941) is an American sculptor and visual artist known especially for her wax paintings and poured latex sculptures. She maintains residences in New York City, Santa Fe, New Mexico, Kastellorizo, Greece, and Ahmedabad, India.

== Early life ==
Benglis was born on October 25, 1941, in Lake Charles, Louisiana. She is Greek-American. As a young child and in her early 20s, Benglis often traveled with her grandmother to Greece. She later described these travels as having been important to her work. In her 2015 interview with Ocula Magazine, the artist said that her grandmother was a significant feminist icon for her:

Her husband died very early—1955. I was the first female grandchild—which is very important in Greece, as the women inherit the property. She was my godmother, as well as my grandmother. My grandmother travelled in her forties, and this was unusual and it impacted the way I was. It set a standard for me.

Growing up, her father Michael ran a building-materials business. Her mother was from Mississippi and was a preacher's daughter. She is the eldest of five children.

Benglis attended McNeese State University in Lake Charles, Louisiana. She earned a BFA degree in 1964 from Newcomb College in New Orleans, which was then the women's college of Tulane University, where she studied ceramics and painting. Following graduation, she taught third grade at Jefferson Parish, in Louisiana. In 1964, Benglis moved to New York. Here she came in contact with many of the influential artists of the decade, such as Andy Warhol, Donald Judd, Sol LeWitt, Eva Hesse, and Barnett Newman. She went on to study painting at the Brooklyn Museum Art School. There she met the Scottish painter Gordon Hart, who was briefly to be her first husband. Benglis later stated that she married Hart to help him avoid the draft. She also took a job as an assistant to Klaus Kertess at the Bykert Gallery before moving on to work at the Paula Cooper Gallery. In 1979 she met her life partner, Anand Sarabhai, the son of her hosts on a trip she made to Ahmedabad, India. Sarabhai died in February 2013.

== Career ==
Benglis's work is noted for an unusual blend of organic imagery and confrontation with newer media incorporating influences such as Barnett Newman and Andy Warhol. Her early work used materials such as beeswax before moving on to large polyurethane pieces in the 1970s and later to gold-leaf, zinc, and aluminum. The validity of much of her work was questioned until the 1980s due to its use of sensuality and physicality.

Contraband (1969) at the Whitney Museum in 2023

Benglis's latex and polyurethane pours of the late 1960s and 1970s marked her entry into the New York art world. At the same time, she was also working on "small encaustic relief paintings".

Like other artists such as Yves Klein, Benglis's work resembled Jackson Pollock's flinging and dripping methods of painting. Works such as Fallen Painting (1968) inform the approach with what could be read as a feminist perspective. For this work, Benglis smeared Day-Glo paint across the gallery floor invoking "the depravity of the 'fallen' woman" or, from a feminist perspective, a "prone victim of phallic male desire." In her work Contraband (1969), she removed the use of a canvas altogether and created her work directly on the floor. These brightly colored organic floor pieces work to disrupt the male-dominated minimalism movement with their suggestiveness and openness.

Vittorio (1979) at the National Gallery of Art in 2009

The structure of the new medium itself played an important role in addressing questions about female identity in relation to art, pop culture, and dominant feminism movements at the time.

In the 1970s, she turned to video as an extension of her sculptural work, producing over a dozen works between 1972 and 1977. Benglis dove into metal casting in the mid 1980s, most notably a series of public fountain projects.

Benglis has been a professor or visiting artist at the University of Rochester (1970-1972), Princeton University (1975), University of Arizona (1982), School of Visual Arts (1985-1987).

=== Artforum advertisement ===
==== History ====
Benglis in her advertisement in the November 1974 issue of Artforum

Benglis felt underrepresented in the male-run artistic community and so confronted the "male ethos" in a series of magazine advertisements satirizing pin-up girls, Hollywood actresses, and traditional depictions of nude female models in canonical works of art. Benglis chose the medium of magazine advertisements as it allowed her complete control of an image rather than allowing it to be run through critical commentary. This series culminated with a particularly controversial one in the November 1974 issue of Artforum featuring Benglis posing with a large plastic dildo and wearing only a pair of sunglasses promoting an upcoming exhibition of hers at the Paula Cooper Gallery. Benglis paid $3,000 for the Artforum ad. One of her original ideas for the advertisement had been for her and collaborative partner Robert Morris to work together as a double pin-up, but eventually found that using a double dildo was sufficient as she found it to be "both male and female." Morris, too, put out an advertisement for his work in that month's Artforum which featured himself in full "butch" S&M regalia.

==== Theory ====
In this unmaking of the tradition of the passive female nude, Benglis was working in dialogue with popular discourse about gender and gender performativity published at the time of its execution. In particular, Benglis appears to be undermining June Wayne's theory of the "demonic myth" in which males, in assuming their gender identity, are responsible to a similar posturing and performativity as women, but instead of upholding "feminine" values of passivity, modesty, and gentility, they embody a guise of compensatory hyper-masculinity and heroic bravado. By adopting a phallus, Benglis physically and symbolically muddies the distinction made between these two types of gender performativity and ultimately overturns them, resulting in a positive assertion of femininity's sexual and cultural power.

==== Reception and criticism ====
Artist Barbara Wagner claims that Benglis shows that even with the appropriation of the phallus as a Freudian sign of power, it does not cover her female identity and still emphasizes a female inferiority. Rosalind Krauss and other Artforum personnel attacked Benglis's work in the following month's issue of Artforum describing the advertisement as "exploitative" and "brutalizing". Critic Cindy Nemser of The Feminist Art Journal dismissed the advertisement as well, claiming that the picture showed that Benglis had "so little confidence in her art that she had to resort to kinky cheesecake to push herself over the top." Morris's advertisement, however, generated little commentary, providing evidence for Benglis's view that male artists were encouraged to promote themselves, whereas women were chastised for doing so. Benglis eventually cast five lead sculptures of the dildo that she posed with on the Artforum cover, each entitled Smile, one for each of the Artforum editors who wrote in to complain about her ad.

In 2019, The New York Times cited the work as one of the 25 works of art that defined the contemporary age.

=== Retrospectives, exhibitions, and surveys ===
==== 2009 Irish Museum of Modern Art (IMMA) Retrospective ====
Benglis's work was greatly neglected for a long time. However, in 2009, a 40-year retrospective organized by the Irish Museum of Modern Art served to recognize her career. The exhibit showed her in her true light as a main figure in contemporary art. Not only did it show her vast amount of her work, it showed her enthusiasm to take on charged subjects. The exhibition focused on the 1960s and 1970s, when her work was most involved with the link between painting and sculpture. It included the lozenge-shaped wall pieces of built up multicolored wax layers that Benglis started making in 1966 with which she honored Jackson Pollock's famous drip methods. It also included her knotted bowtie shaped wall reliefs of the 1970s and some of her videos. Her work from the 1980s and 1990s was also shown, represented by a few of her famous pleats, which involved her spraying liquid metal onto chicken wire skeletons, and two videos from each of the decades.

In the stateside versions of the show more works from the 1980s and 1990s were shown including her ceramics. These pieces were made of clay and hand molded so that the viewers could feel the making of them- the extorting, folding, and throwing of the moist resistant material. Glazes seemed to be flung on in a causal manner, which brings to mind the abstract expressionism movement of art in which Benglis is involved. The ceramic pieces have a handmade quality that effect the senses both desire driven and dismal, while the colors suggest the glitz of commercial culture.

Concentrating on Benglis's early work, the curators gave her a main position in the diverse art of the 1970s, a time period that is seen as laying the groundwork for the wide range of expression that continues to grow to this day. Benglis's willingness and ability to mix up gendered tropes with her heroic scales and sparkly colorful finishes while laughing irreverently at views of every moral stripe set her apart from the common customs of feminism and the sexism of the art world. Her work is also deemed important for its meticulous grounding in process and materials used. Each piece produces its own physical understanding. "They provoke visceral reactions while playfully welcoming open ended associations and ambiguities."

==== 2011 Show at the New Museum ====
In 2011, The New Museum organized a four-decade exhibition of Benglis's sculptural works with supplementary videos, Polaroids, and magazine clippings. The show received high praise in the New Yorker magazine, which warned viewers to "prepare to be floored."

==== 2015 The Hepworth Wakefield, Wakefield, UK ====
In 2015, The Hepworth Wakefield presented Benglis's first museum retrospective in the UK. It included over 50 works from across her career, and was structured around the influence of place on Benglis's work, in particular her homes and studios in New York, New Mexico, Greece and India. Curated by Andrew Bonacina, it was described by Guardian critic Adrian Searle as "a revelation."

==== 2012 Thomas Dane Gallery in London ====
This subsequent survey focused on the exploratory breadth of materials Benglis experimented with over the course of her career: polyurethane foam, glass, enamel, stainless steel, beeswax, and poured latex. It was her first major survey in the UK.

==== 2015 Storm King Art Center in Mountainville, New York ====
Lynda Benglis: Water Sources was the first exhibition centered around the outdoor water fountains that Benglis has developed since the early 1980s. More broadly, this presentation took as its point of departure the interest in water and landscape that Benglis has explored throughout the last thirty years of her career.

==== 2016 Cheim & Read in New York ====
In this new work presented at Cheim & Read Gallery in New York, Benglis turned to handmade paper, which she wrapped around thick wire armatures, often painting the sand-tone surface in bright, metallic colors offset by strokes of deep, coal-based black. At other times the paper was left virtually bare. As Nancy Princenthal writes in her essay published in the accompanying exhibition catalogue, these works reflect the environment in which they were made, the 'sere and windblown' landscape of Santa Fe, New Mexico. As a counterweight to the paper sculptures, Benglis also exhibited "The Fall Caught", a large-scale aluminum work made by applying spray foam instead of strips of handmade paper on the chicken wire armature, as well as a new series of spiraling, hand-built black ceramics called "Elephant Necklace".

==== 2016 Thomas Brambilla gallery in Bergamo, Italy ====
In December 2016, Lynda Benglis had her very first solo show in Italy, titled "Benglis and the Baroque", at Thomas Brambilla gallery. The exhibition included a series of large scale marble Torsos specially made for the show. "Benglis and the Baroque" explored Benglis's long-held interest in Baroque sculpture; much like Gianlorenzo Bernini, Benglis seeks to freeze the intensity of the moment and merge beauty and sensuality in spectacular frozen gestures. Benglis's attention to materials and ongoing research into the "extravagant" are in full agreement with Baroque poetics.

==== 2016 Bergen Assembly in Bergen, Norway ====
Throughout 2016, the Bergen Assembly in Bergen, Norway presented a cycle of events, publications, and exhibitions on the artistic practice of Lynda Benglis. Curated by Rhea Dall and Kristine Siegel, PRAXES Center for Contemporary Art.

==== 2016 Museo International del Barroco in Puebla, Mexico ====
The Government of Puebla presented the work of Lynda Benglis as the second temporary exhibition, "Cuerpos, Materia y Alma: Las Esculturas de Lynda Benglis", at the International Museum of the Baroque. The exuberant forms, folds and contortions, variety of materials, textures and colors, in addition to the size of sculptures, expressed a new sensibility in neobaroque art: contemporary, daring and dynamic. Benglis's purpose was to engage in a dialogue with the architecture of Toyo Ito, the Museum's designer, and to express her fondness for Mexico.

==== 2019 Goulandris Museum of Cycladic Art in Athens, Greece ====
NEON Organization for Culture and Development organized Lynda Benglis's first solo museum exhibition in a country that has played a major role in her life and vision: Greece. The exhibition Lynda Benglis: In the Realm of the Senses unites 36 of the artist’s singular creations, spanning half a century from 1969 onwards.

==== 2022 Nasher Sculpture Center in Dallas, Texas ====
The Nasher Sculpture Center's 2022 summer exhibition titled Lynda Benglis "highlights three bodies of work in media as diverse as traditional bronze and decorative glitter." The exhibition highlights some of Benglis's more recent artistic creations.

=== Collaborations ===
Benglis created a series of prints as part of a collaboration with master printer Stan Baden with the Print Research Institute of North Texas at the University of North Texas.

=== Video work ===
During the 1970s, Benglis engaged in dialogues relating to the feminist movement through her art by pioneering a radical body of video work made up of fifteen videos. She turned to video art in 1971 in order to explore a media that could more easily communicate her feminist politics. Benglis's performance-based videos confront issues of gender and identity by referencing the societal representation and construction of women and their sexuality as well as the interaction between viewer and artist, self and ambiguity. Though Benglis's sculptures reference sexuality through subtly eroticized materials and forms, her video work approaches the subject conceptually and more explicitly.

Benglis's interest in human form found in her sculptural work is made present in her videos in through the consistent theme of self-reflexivity. Video offers a direct representation of a figure, a history of popular culture, and a way to illustrate bodies interacting in space, making it useful for feminist discourse. Benglis employs various technical manipulations of video as a medium to complicate the boundaries of visual form and highlight mediations of the self, including a recursive technique by filming television screens playing videos that she had filmed previously, often several layers deep. By doing so, she further exposes the interface between inner and outer realities by using and reproducing her own body and its image through video manipulations, interacting with her own image and voice, and confusing the viewer's perception of time and space. Consequently, Benglis's work destabilizes what are traditionally believed to be video's "inherent properties" such as liveness and "real" time, spatial orientation and relations, and separation of creator and creation.

In 1971, Benglis began to collaborate with Robert Morris, and produced her first video work, Mumble (1972). Morris's Exchange (1973) also came out of this collaboration. Mumble features figures arranged in space across several screens. Often, the artist will announce the relation from them to the person from off camera, sometimes calling them multiple different names and labeling them with different, incompatible roles. The viewer becomes distrustful of the narrator, calling into question the role and authority of any voiceover speech. Other statements in this video are descriptions such as "Robin is weaving in the studio downstairs," and "the phone is ringing." The straightforward nature of these statements stands in contrast to the confusion created by the recursive screens. The viewer has no way of knowing if the phone is ringing while the artist is filming the final video, or when she was filming Morris in the very bottom layer, or the layer in between. The warped sense of time and space works to question the privilege of visuality in such a strongly visual culture, offering a critique of television as a medium as well as the potential truthfulness of any image.

Benglis completed four other videos in 1972, namely Noise, Document, Home Tapes Revised, and On Screen. All feature her recursive screen technique. Document and On Screen feature particularly strong feminist themes, and both feature the artist directly. Document features a progression undergone by the artist from directed to director, finishing with her writing copyright information juxtaposed to her own image. In this way, she reclaims and maintains control of her image, a feminist act for a female artist. Similarly, On Screen shows the artist making faces at the camera in recursive layers of video. She performs expressions reminiscent of ones that people make in a mirror when no one is looking, and then magnifies it threefold through repetition. In this way, she blocks the potential interpretation of her image and emotional state being present for others.

One of her own more noted videos is Female Sensibility (1973), which shows the artist kissing and licking the face of fellow artist Marilyn Lenkowsky. Many other of Benglis's earlier solo films are highly technically manipulated, edited, and re-taped, thus blending present and past video sequences and selves to enhance the feeling of artifice. For instance, in Now (1973) the artist's face is recursively featured, but this time the self-evidencing frame of the television is cropped out. The artist superimposes a video of herself yelling commands such as "Now!" and "Start recording!" over an older video of herself apparently echoing the shout, blurring the line between documentary and performance while also making it difficult to tell which image of the artist is present, which is past, and which of these is therefore truly performing.

In Noise (1972) Benglis employs mechanical reproduction and through looped feedback tapes. Throughout Noise, she plays over several generations of similar taped images and soundtracks to introduce increasing amounts of distortion. The conversion of the looped and layered aural and visual components highlights the boundaries of intelligibility, resulting in the disassociation of sound and image. In On Screen (1972) Benglis visually implicates infinite regression of time and space, similarly manipulating generations of videotapes to confound the viewer's sense of time. The sequence of creation, presented as a gendered self-portrait, is heavily obscured by the layered repetition of aural and visual components. Through this exercise of audiovisual desynchronization, the notions of "original self" and "original production" are complicated by the layers of self-images presented simultaneously with layers of "self". In doing so, Benglis emphasizes that video as a medium is based upon mechanical reproduction, thus subverting the classical notion of authenticity and reproduction in fine art.

=== Selected works ===
Lynda Benglis's works distributed by the Video Data Bank include:

- The Amazing Bow Wow (1976), 30:07 min, color, sound
- Collage (1973), 9:30 min, color, sound
- Discrepancy (1973), 13:44 min, black and white, sound
- Document (1972), 6:08 min, black and white, sound
- Enclosure (1973), 07:23 min, black and white, sound
- Female Sensibility (1973), 13:05 min, color, sound
- The Grunions are Running (1973), 5:41, black and white, sound
- Home Tape Revised (1972), 28:00 min, black and white, sound
- How's Tricks (1976), 34:00 min, color, sound
- Monitor (1999), 00:20 min, color, sound
- Mumble (1972), 20:00 min, black and white, sound
- Noise (1972), 07:15, black and white, sound
- Now (1973), 11:45 min, color, sound
- On Screen (1972), 7:45 min, black and white, sound

== Exhibitions ==
On November 4, 2009, Benglis's first European retrospective opened at the Irish Museum of Modern Art, in Dublin, where it ran through January 24, 2010. It then moved to Le Consortium, in Dijon, France; the Museum of Art at the Rhode Island School of Design, in Providence; and the New Museum, in New York.

Between 1969 and 1995 Benglis held over 75 solo exhibitions of her work both in the United States and abroad. Benglis's work is held in collections including The Guggenheim, the Los Angeles County Museum of Art, the Scottsdale Museum of Contemporary Art, the High Museum, Albright-Knox Art Gallery, New Orleans Museum of Art, the San Francisco Museum of Modern Art, Museum of Modern Art, Corcoran Gallery of Art, Whitney Museum of American Art, the Walker Art Center, Hokkaido Museum of Modern Art, National Gallery of Victoria and others. Her work was included in the 2024 exhibition Making Their Mark: Works from the Shah Garg Collection at the Berkeley Art Museum and Pacific Film Archive (BAMPFA).

== Selected solo and group exhibitions ==
- 1986: Natural Forms and Forces: Abstract Images in American Sculpture, Hayden Gallery, MIT, Cambridge, Massachusetts
- 2007: "WACK! Art and the Feminist Revolution", Museum of Contemporary Art, Los Angeles, March 4-July 16, 2007.
- 2009: Whitney Museum of American Art, New York.
- 2009: Lynda Benglis, Van Abbemuseum, Eindhoven; traveled to the Irish Museum of Modern Art, Dublin; Museum le Consortium, Dijon, France; Museum of Art, Rhode Island School of Design, Providence; New Museum, New York; The Museum of Contemporary Art, Los Angeles, California.
- 2015: Lynda Benglis, Hepworth Wakefield, 6 Feb - 1 July 2015, Wakefield, West Yorkshire, UK.
- 2020: Lynda Benglis, National Gallery of Art, Washington, DC, March 22, 2020 – January 24, 2021.
- 2021: Benglis's work was included in the exhibition Women in Abstraction at the Centre Pompidou.
- 2024: Fuentes at Jardines de Banca March, Madrid, Spain (2024)

== Recognition ==
Mary Beth Edelson's Some Living American Women Artists / Last Supper (1972) appropriated Leonardo da Vinci’s The Last Supper, with the heads of notable women artists collaged over the heads of Christ and his apostles. Benglis was among those notable women artists. This image, addressing the role of religious and art historical iconography in the subordination of women, became "one of the most iconic images of the feminist art movement."

Benglis won a Yale-Norfolk Summer School Scholarship in 1963, and a Max Beckmann scholarship in 1965.

In 1975 Benglis was awarded with a Guggenheim Fellowship. She has also received two grants from the National Endowment for the Arts, one in 1979 and the other in 1990.

Benglis has been awarded a Minos Beach Art Symposium grant, a grant from the Delphi Art Symposium, a grant from the Olympiad of Art Sculpture Park (Korea), all in 1988. Benglis received a grant from the National Council of Art Administration in 1989.

In 2000 Benglis was awarded an honorary doctorate from the Kansas City Art Institute.

In 2017 The International Sculpture Center awarded artists Lynda Benglis and Tony Cragg for the 2017 Lifetime Achievement in Contemporary Sculpture Award.
