= Barry Le Va =

American painter (1941–2021)

- Born: December 28, 1941; Long Beach, California
- Died: January 24, 2021 (aged 79)
- Education: Otis Art Institute of LA County, Los Angeles, BA, 1964, MFA 1967; Los Angeles College of Art & Design, 1963; California State University, Long Beach, 1960–63
- Known for: Sculpture, Installation art
- Movement: Process art
- Awards: Guggenheim Fellowship for Sculpture, 1974

Barry Edward Le Va (December 28, 1941 – January 24, 2021) was an American sculptor and installation artist. Trained in his native California, he lived and worked in New York City. Le Va was among the leading figures of post-studio and process art to have emerged in the late 1960s. His abstract sculptures, installations, drawings, and editioned works are featured in major art collections around the world.

== Training and early career ==
Le Va attended California State University, Long Beach from 1960 to 1963, continuing his studies at Los Angeles College of Art & Design, and at the Otis Art Institute of LA County, Los Angeles, where he received a Master of Fine Arts (MFA) degree in 1967.

In 1968, Le Va was awarded a Young Talent Grant from the Los Angeles County Museum of Art. He worked as an instructor at Minneapolis College of Art & Design from 1968 to 1970, and taught advanced sculpture at Princeton University from 1973 to 1974. From 1976 he taught graduate-level classes in sculpture at Yale University.

In 1974, Le Va received a Guggenheim Fellowship for Sculpture, and in 1976, received a National Endowment for the Arts Fellowship.

== Work ==
Le Va's pioneering scatter pieces on the floor, started in 1966, made him one of the first of the so-called Process artists. In 1969, he started to create works with cleavers serially embedded in walls or floors. More recently, he produced monumental abstract works and site-specific installations.

Le Va's first solo exhibitions were held in 1969 at the Minneapolis Institute of Arts and at the Walker Art Center, Minneapolis. Since then, Le Va exhibited his work across the United States, as well as Canada, Europe, and Israel.

In 2005, Le Va's work was the subject of a major retrospective exhibition at the Institute of Contemporary Art, University of Pennsylvania, Philadelphia (ICA). The exhibition, Accumulated Vision, Barry Le Va, was accompanied by the publication of a comprehensive monograph of the artist's work. The ICA described Le Va's work as: "Since the late 1960s, the American artist Barry Le Va has used broken glass, meat cleavers, wool felt, ball bearings, powdered chalk, cast concrete, paper towels, linseed oil, a typewriter and a gun, among other things, to make his art. Part of a generation intent on knocking art off its pedestal, Le Va claimed the floor as his field of operations by scattering massive amounts of materials, or forms, to create works which he called "distributions." Apparently random, even chaotic, these installations are in fact premeditated and executed according to plan. Not surprisingly, drawing plays a significant role in the work of this artist whose formative training is in architecture. Le Va's distributions make him one of the leading practitioners of Post-minimalism and Process Art. But his own, preferred frame of reference comes not from recent art history, but from mystery novels. He has likened his installations to crime scenes and invites viewers to look for clues to reconstruct the often violent act or concept that underlies them."

Le Va was once described as being "Like his art, he's not such an easy guy to be around, by turns challenging, gracious, explanatory and gnomic".

The estate of Le Va is represented by David Nolan Gallery, who has been exhibiting shows with Le Va since 1989. Le Va was previously represented by the Sonnabend Gallery in New York and Galerie Rolf Ricke in Cologne, Germany.

Le Va's work is found in the following museum collections (among others):

- Albright-Knox Art Gallery, Buffalo, New York
- Art Institute of Chicago
- Dallas Museum of Art
- Los Angeles County Museum of Art
- Minneapolis Institute of Arts
- Museum of Contemporary Art, Los Angeles
- Museum of Modern Art, New York
- National Gallery of Art, Washington, D.C.
- Parrish Art Museum, Southampton, New York
- Serralves Museum of Contemporary Art, Porto, Portugal
- Staatliche Graphische Sammlung München
- Walker Art Center, Minneapolis
- Wexner Center for the Arts, Ohio State University, Columbus
- Whitney Museum of American Art, New York
