= Herbert and Dorothy Vogel =

American art collectors

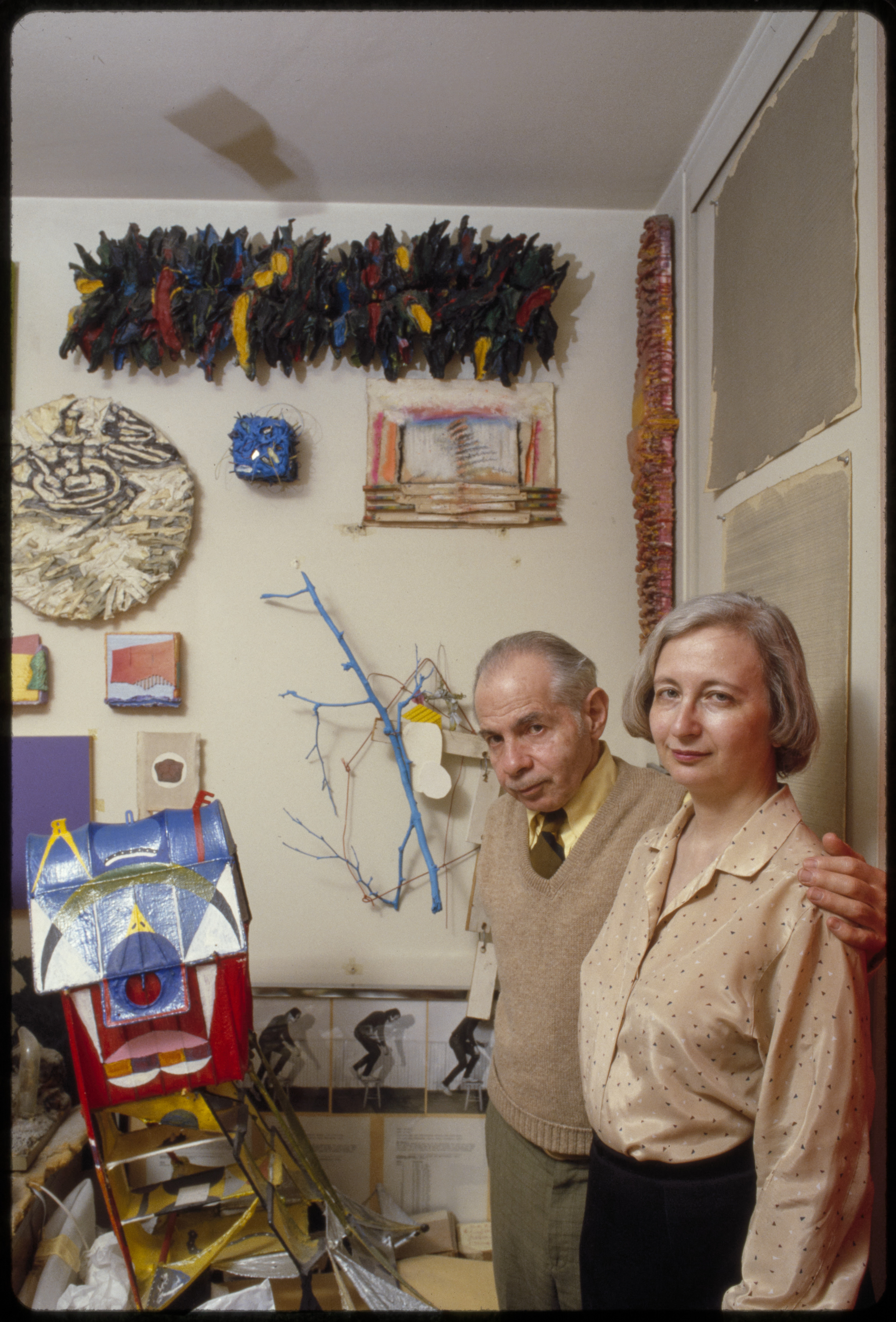
Herbert and Dorothy Vogel

Herbert Vogel (August 16, 1922 – July 22, 2012) and Dorothy Vogel (May 14, 1935 – November 10, 2025), once described as "proletarian art collectors", worked as civil servants in New York City for more than a half-century while amassing what has been called one of the most important post-1960s art collections in the United States, mostly of minimalist and conceptual art.

== Early years ==
Herbert Vogel, known as Herb, was the son of a Russian Jewish garment worker from Harlem. He never finished high school and, after serving in the U.S. Army during World War II, worked nights as a clerk sorting mail for the United States Postal Service until his retirement in 1979. Dorothy Faye Hoffman was the daughter of an Orthodox Jewish stationery merchant from Elmira, New York. She received a bachelor's degree from Syracuse University and a master's degree from the University of Denver, both in library science, and worked until her retirement in 1990 as a librarian for the Brooklyn Public Library.

Herbert and Dorothy married in 1962, a year after they met, in Elmira. Early in their marriage, they took painting classes at New York University, but later gave up painting in favor of collecting. They had no children, lived very frugally, and shared their living space with fish, turtles, and cats named after famous painters.

== Early acquisitions ==
One of their earliest acquisitions was a work by Giuseppe Napoli that Herb bought before marrying Dorothy. They bought a ceramic piece by Pablo Picasso to celebrate their engagement. A piece called Crushed Car Parts by American sculptor John Chamberlain was their first post-wedding acquisition.

The couple used Dorothy's income to cover their living expenses and instead of eating in restaurants or travelling, they used Herb's income, which peaked at $23,000 annually, for art. They did not buy for investment purposes, choosing only pieces they personally liked and could carry home on the subway or in a taxi. They bought directly from the artists, often paying in installments. Once, according to The Washington Post, they received a collage from environmental artist Christo in exchange for cat-sitting. In 1975, they held the first exhibition of their collection, at the Clocktower Gallery in lower Manhattan.

== The collection ==
They amassed a collection of over 4,782 works, which they displayed, and also stored in closets and under the bed, in their rent-controlled one-bedroom apartment on Manhattan's Upper East Side. Though their focus was mainly conceptual art and minimalist art, the collection also includes noteworthy post-minimalist work. Their collection eventually came to include work from artists such as pop artist Roy Lichtenstein, photographers Cindy Sherman and Lorna Simpson, minimalist Robert Mangold, and post-minimalist Richard Tuttle.

In 1992, the Vogels decided to transfer the entire collection to the National Gallery of Art because it charges no admission, does not sell donated works, and they wanted their art to belong to the public. In late 2008, they launched The Dorothy and Herbert Vogel Collection: Fifty Works for Fifty States along with the National Gallery of Art, the National Endowment for the Arts, and the Institute of Museum and Library Services. The program donated 2,500 works to 50 institutions across 50 states and was accompanied by a book with the same name.

== Deaths ==
Herbert Vogel died at a nursing home in Manhattan on July 22, 2012, at the age of 89. Dorothy Vogel died at a hospital in Manhattan on November 10, 2025, at the age of 90.

== Documentaries ==
Megumi Sasaki has made two documentaries about the Vogels.

Released in 2008, Herb and Dorothy focused on the story of the Vogels, how they amassed their collection, and their donation of it to the National Gallery of Art. It won six awards at five different film festivals.

Released in 2013, Herb and Dorothy 50x50 continued from when the previous documentary had ended, and concentrated on the distribution of fifty works from the collection to one museum in each of the fifty states within the U.S. as well as the role that the Vogels and some of the artists had in their exhibition.

== Friendships with notable artists ==
The Vogels bought art from and became close friends with influential New York artists of the second half of the 20th century including Sol LeWitt, Richard Tuttle, and many of the artists listed below.

== List of recipient museums ==
The recipient museums of the Vogel Collection's Fifty Works for Fifty States program are:

- Alabama – Birmingham Museum of Art
- Alaska – University of Alaska Museum of the North
- Arizona – Phoenix Art Museum
- Arkansas – Arkansas Arts Center
- California – Museum of Contemporary Art, Los Angeles
- Colorado – Colorado Springs Fine Arts Center
- Connecticut – Yale University Art Gallery
- Delaware – Delaware Art Museum
- Florida – Miami Art Museum
- Georgia – High Museum of Art
- Hawaii – Honolulu Museum of Art
- Idaho – Boise Art Museum
- Illinois – University Museum, Southern Illinois University
- Indiana – Indianapolis Museum of Art
- Iowa – Museum of Art Cedar Rapids
- Kansas – Spencer Museum of Art
- Kentucky – Speed Art Museum
- Louisiana – New Orleans Museum of Art
- Maine – Portland Museum of Art
- Maryland – Academy Art Museum
- Massachusetts – Harvard Art Museums
- Michigan – University of Michigan Museum of Art
- Minnesota – Weisman Art Museum
- Mississippi – Mississippi Museum of Art
- Missouri – Daum Museum of Contemporary Art
- Montana – Yellowstone Art Museum
- Nebraska – Joslyn Art Museum
- Nevada – Marjorie Barrick Museum of Art
- New Hampshire – Hood Museum of Art
- New Jersey – Montclair Art Museum
- New Mexico – New Mexico Museum of Art
- New York – Albright-Knox Art Gallery
- North Carolina – Weatherspoon Art Museum
- North Dakota – Plains Art Museum
- Ohio – Akron Art Museum
- Oklahoma – Oklahoma City Museum of Art
- Oregon – Portland Art Museum
- Pennsylvania – Pennsylvania Academy of the Fine Arts
- Rhode Island – Rhode Island School of Design Museum
- South Carolina – Columbia Museum of Art
- South Dakota – South Dakota Art Museum
- Tennessee – Memphis Brooks Museum of Art
- Texas – Blanton Museum of Art
- Utah – Nora Eccles Harrison Museum of Art
- Vermont – Robert Hull Fleming Museum
- Virginia – Virginia Museum of Fine Arts
- Washington – Seattle Art Museum
- West Virginia – Huntington Museum of Art
- Wisconsin – Milwaukee Art Museum
- Wyoming – University of Wyoming Art Museum

== List of artists ==
The artists included in the Vogels' gifts are:

- Gregory Amenoff
- Eric Amouyal
- William Anastasi
- Joe Andoe
- Carl Andre
- Stephen Antonakos
- Richard Anuszkiewicz
- Nancy Arlen
- Anne Arnold
- Richard Artschwager
- Jo Baer
- Carel Balth
- Will Barnet
- Robert Barry
- Zigi Ben-Haim
- Lynda Benglis
- Joseph Beuys
- James Bishop
- Ronald Bladen
- Dike Blair
- William (Bill) Bollinger
- Gary Bower
- Lisa Bradley
- Richmond Burton
- André Cadere
- Loren D. Calaway
- Peter Campus
- McWillie Chambers
- Ann Chernow
- Chryssa
- Michael Clark (Clark Fox)
- John Clem Clarke
- Charles Clough
- Kathleen Cooke
- Peggy Cyphers
- Gene Davis
- Claudia DeMonte
- Stuart Diamond
- Lois Dodd
- Koki Doktori
- Rackstraw Downes
- Robert Duran
- Benni Efrat
- William Fares
- R.M. Fischer
- Joel Fisher
- Richard Francisco
- Adam Fuss
- Charles Gaines
- Pinchas Cohen Gan
- Dixie Friend Gay
- Jon Gibson
- David Gilhooly
- Michael Goldberg
- Ron Gorchov
- Sidney Gordin
- Dan Graham
- Denise Green
- Rodney Alan Greenblat
- Peter Halley
- William L. Haney
- Don Hazlitt
- Jene Highstein
- Stewart Hitch
- Jim Hodges
- Tom Holland
- John Hultberg
- Ralph Humphrey
- Bryan Hunt
- David Hunter
- Peter Hutchinson
- Will Insley
- Patrick Ireland aka Brian O’Doherty
- Ralph Iwamoto
- Neil Jenney
- Bill Jensen
- Martin Johnson
- Joan Jonas
- Tobi Kahn
- Stephen Kaltenbach
- Steven Karr
- Steve Keister
- Alain Kirili
- Mark Kostabi
- Moshe Kupferman
- Cheryl Laemmle
- Ronnie Landfield
- Michael Lash
- John Latham
- Michael Lathrop
- Wendy Lehman
- Annette Lemieux
- Jill Levine
- Sol LeWitt
- Roy Lichtenstein
- Robert Lawrance Lobe
- Michael Lucero
- Robert Mangold
- Sylvia Plimack Mangold
- Andy Mann
- Allan McCollum
- Antoni Miralda
- William Paul Morehouse
- Kyle Morris
- Vik Muniz
- Takashi Murakami
- Catherine E. Murphy
- Elizabeth Murray
- Forrest Myers
- Giuseppe Napoli
- Joseph Nechvatal
- Richard Nonas
- David Novros
- Nam June Paik
- Raymond Parker
- Betty Parsons
- Henry C. Pearson
- Joel Perlman
- Richard Pettibone
- Lil Picard
- Larry Poons
- Katherine Porter
- Lucio Pozzi
- David Rabinowitch
- David Reed
- Edda Renouf
- Edward Renouf
- Judy Rifka
- Rodney Ripps
- Alexis Rockman
- Stephen Rosenthal
- Christy Rupp
- David Salle
- John Salt
- Alan Saret
- David Sawin
- F. (Frank) L. Schröder
- Hans Jürgen [H.A.] Schult
- Peter Schuyff
- Barbara Schwartz
- Joel Shapiro
- Judith Shea
- Cindy Sherman
- Alan Shields
- Yinka Shonibare
- James Siena
- Lorna Simpson
- Tony Smith
- Keith Sonnier
- Richard Stankiewicz
- Robert Stanley
- Pat Steir
- Gary Stephan
- Michelle Stuart
- Donald Sultan
- Lori Taschler
- Hap Tivey
- John Torreano
- Daryl Trivieri
- Richard Tuttle
- Lynn Umlauf
- Leo Valledor
- Richard Van Buren
- Ruth Vollmer
- Ursula von Rydingsvard
- Robert Marshall Watts
- Lawrence Weiner
- Bettina Werner
- Joseph White
- Thornton Willis
- Terry Winters
- Tod Wizon
- Martin Wong
- Betty Woodman
- Mario Yrissary
- Larry Zox
- Joe Zucker
- Michael Zwack

== See also ==
- 1992 in art
