= Gregory Amenoff =

American painter (born 1948)

- Born: 1948 (age 77–78); Saint Charles, Illinois
- Occupation: Visual Artist

Gregory Amenoff (born 1948) is an American painter. He is located in the tradition of the early American Modernist painters Georgia O'Keeffe, Charles Burchfield, Milton Avery, Arthur Dove and Marsden Hartley. In the early 80s his work was often associated with a style of painting called organic abstraction and exhibited alongside artists Bill Jensen, Katherine Porter and Terry Winters.

Gregory Amenoff was born in Saint Charles, Illinois, in 1948 to Beatice and C.V. Amenoff. He received a B.A. in history from Beloit College in 1970. He moved to Boston in 1971 where he began his career, showing at the Nielsen Gallery on Newbury Street. He relocated to New York in 1979. In 1980 he began showing with Robert Miller Gallery on Fifth Avenue. Amenoff was included in the 1981, 1985 biennials at the Whitney Museum of American Art. He was also included in An International Survey of Recent Paintings and Sculpture at Museum of Modern Art in 1984 and the 40th Biennial Exhibition of American Contemporary Painting at the Corcoran Gallery of Art, Washington, D.C., in 1987. In the 1990s Amenoff had three traveling solo exhibitions. A retrospective of works on paper originating at the DeCordova Museum and Sculpture Park in Lincoln, Massachusetts, titled Gregory Amenoff, Works on Paper 1975–1992 traveled to Massachusetts, Tampa Museum of Art, Tampa, Florida, Norton Gallery of Art, West Palm Beach, Florida, Wellington Gray Gallery, and East Carolina University, in Greenville, North Carolina. An exhibition of 19 large scaled paintings called The Sky Below traveled to University of Tennessee Gallery, Knoxville, Tennessee, Sarah Moody Gallery of Art, University of Alabama, Tuscaloosa, Alabama, University Art Gallery, New Mexico State University, Las Cruces, New Mexico, the California Center for the Arts, Escondido, California and the Ringling School of Art Gallery, Ringling School of Art, Sarasota, Florida. Amenoff was also the subject of a two-year traveling show of small paintings Thirty Views, which originated in Syracuse, New York and went to venues in Boston, San Francisco, and elsewhere. From 1986 to 1993 Amenoff showed with Hirschl & Adler Modern on Madison Avenue. He showed at Salander O'Reilly on East 79th Street from 1998 to 2004. He has had several one-person exhibitions at the Stephen Wirtz Gallery in San Francisco, California, James Corcoran Gallery in Los Angeles, California, Gerald Peters Gallery in Santa Fe, New Mexico and Texas Gallery in Houston, Texas.

Amenoff was president of the National Academy of Design from 2001 to 2005. He is a founding member of the CUE Art Foundation, where he served as the curator/governor from 2002 to 2015. He has taught at Columbia University since 1994, where he holds the endowed Chair as the Eve and Herman Gelman Professor of the Visual Arts Program. He served as chair of the Visual Arts Department from 2007 to 2013. He holds an honorary doctorate from the Massachusetts College of Art.

== Personal life ==
Gregory Alexander Amenoff lives and works in New York City and Ulster County. For many years he spent his summers in El Rito, New Mexico. He is married to Sonia Phillips Resika and has three children: Arielle Alexandra Amenoff (born 1984), August Paul Amenoff (born 2001), and Georgia Phillips Amenoff (born 2005)

== Collections ==
- Albright–Knox Art Gallery, Buffalo, New York
- Alexandre Gallery, New York, New York
- Art Institute of Chicago, Chicago
- Baltimore Museum of Art, Baltimore
- Brooklyn Museum of Art, Brooklyn
- Butler Institute of American Art, Youngstown, Ohio
- Castellani Art Museum, Niagara Falls, N.Y
- Cleveland Museum of Art, Cleveland, Ohio
- Currier Gallery of Art, Manchester, New Hampshire
- Frances and Sidney Lewis Foundation, Richmond, Virginia
- Hood Museum of Art, Hanover, New Hampshire
- Honolulu Academy of Art, Honolulu
- Kemper Museum of Contemporary Art, Kansas City, Missouri
- Maier Museum of Art, Lynchburg, Virginia
- Metropolitan Museum of Art, New York
- Milwaukee Museum of Art, Milwaukee
- Minneapolis Institute of Arts, Minneapolis
- Muscarelle Museum of Art, College of William and Mary, Williamsburg, Virginia
- Museum of Fine Arts, Boston, Massachusetts
- Museum of Modern Art, New York
- National Museum of American Art, Washington, D.C.
- Neuberger Museum, State University of New York at Purchase, New York
- New York Public Library, Spencer Collection, New York
- Norton Museum of Art, West Palm Beach, Florida
- Pennsylvania Academy of the Fine Arts, Philadelphia
- Phoenix Art Museum Phoenix, Arizona
- Rose Art Museum, Brandeis University, Waltham, Massachusetts
- San Antonio Museum of Art, San Antonio, Texas
- San Francisco Museum of Art, San Francisco
- Whitney Museum of American Art, New York, New York

== Awards ==
- 2011, Guggenheim Fellowship
- 1997, 1995, 1993 American Academy of Arts and Letters Purchase Award
- 1989, 1981, 1980 National Endowment for the Arts Award (Painting)
- 1981, C.A.P.S. (New York State Council on the Arts Award)
- 1980, The Louis B. Comfort Tiffany Foundation Award
- 1979, The Artist Foundation of Massachusetts Award
- 1976, Massachusetts Bicentennial Painting Award
