= Fear and Loathing in Las Vegas (film) =

1998 film by Terry Gilliam

- Theatrical release poster
- Directed by: Terry Gilliam
- Screenplay by: Terry Gilliam; Tony Grisoni; Tod Davies; Alex Cox
- Based on: Fear and Loathing in Las Vegas by Hunter S. Thompson
- Produced by: Laila Nabulsi; Patrick Cassavetti; Stephen Nemeth
- Starring: Johnny Depp; Benicio del Toro
- Cinematography: Nicola Pecorini
- Edited by: Lesley Walker
- Music by: Ray Cooper
- Production companies: Summit Entertainment; Rhino Films; Shark Productions; Fear and Loathing LLC
- Distributed by: Universal Pictures (United States, Canada, United Kingdom, Ireland and Scandinavia); Summit Entertainment (International)
- Release date: May 22, 1998
- Running time: 118 minutes
- Country: United States
- Language: English
- Budget: $18.5 million
- Box office: $13.7 million

Fear and Loathing in Las Vegas is a 1998 American film based on Hunter S. Thompson's novel of the same name. It was co-written and directed by Terry Gilliam and stars Johnny Depp and Benicio del Toro as Raoul Duke and Dr. Gonzo, respectively. The film details the duo's journey through Las Vegas as their initial journalistic intentions devolve into an exploration of the city under the influence of psychoactive substances.

Fear and Loathing in Las Vegas was released on May 22, 1998, by Universal Pictures. The film received polarized reviews from critics and was a financial failure, but over the years it has since been regarded as a cult classic.

== Plot ==
In 1971, Raoul Duke and Dr. Gonzo speed across the Mojave Desert. Duke, under the influence of mescaline, complains of a swarm of giant bats, and inventories their drug stash. They pick up a young hitchhiker and explain their mission: Duke has been assigned by a magazine to cover the Mint 400 motorcycle race in Las Vegas. They bought excessive drugs for the trip, and rented a red Chevrolet Impala convertible. The hitchhiker flees on foot at their behavior.

Trying to reach Vegas before the hitchhiker can go to the police, Gonzo gives Duke part of a sheet of "Sunshine Acid" (ultra-purified LSD), then informs him that there is little chance of making it before the drug kicks in. By the time they reach the strip, Duke is in the full throes of his trip and barely makes it through the hotel check-in, hallucinating that the clerk is a moray eel and that his fellow bar patrons are draconian lizards.

The next day, Duke arrives at the race and heads out with his photographer, Lacerda. Duke becomes irrational and believes that they are in the middle of a battlefield, so he fires Lacerda and returns to the hotel. After consuming more mescaline, as well as huffing diethyl ether, Duke and Gonzo arrive at the Bazooko Circus casino but leave shortly afterwards, the chaotic atmosphere frightening Gonzo. Back in the hotel room, Duke leaves Gonzo unattended, and tries his luck at Big Six.

When Duke returns he finds that Gonzo, high on LSD, has trashed the room, and is in the bathtub clothed, attempting to pull the tape player in with him as he wants to hear the song better. He pleads with Duke to throw the machine into the water when the song "White Rabbit" peaks. Duke agrees, but instead throws a grapefruit at Gonzo's head before running outside and locking Gonzo in the bathroom. Duke attempts to type his reminiscences on hippie culture, and flashes back to San Francisco, 1965, where a hippie licks spilled LSD off his sleeve.

The next morning, Duke awakens to an exorbitant room service bill and no sign of Gonzo (who has returned to Los Angeles while Duke slept), and attempts to leave town. As he nears Baker, California, a patrolman stops him for speeding, and advises him to sleep at a nearby rest stop. Duke instead heads to a payphone and calls Gonzo, learning that he has a suite in his name at the Flamingo Las Vegas so he can cover a district attorney's convention on narcotics. Duke checks into his suite, only to be met by an LSD-tripping Gonzo and a young girl called Lucy, who Gonzo explains has come to Las Vegas to meet Barbra Streisand, and that this was her first LSD trip. Duke convinces Gonzo to ditch Lucy in another hotel before her trip wears off.

Gonzo accompanies Duke to the convention, and the pair discreetly snort cocaine as the guest speaker delivers a comically out-of-touch speech about "marijuana addicts" before showing a brief film. Unable to take it, Duke and Gonzo flee back to their room, only to discover that Lucy has called. Their trips mostly over, Gonzo deals with Lucy over the phone (pretending that he is being savagely beaten by thugs) as Duke attempts to mellow out by trying some of Gonzo's stash of adrenochrome. Duke has a bad reaction to the drugs and is reduced to an incoherent mess before he blacks out.

After an unspecified amount of time passes, Duke wakes up to a complete ruin of the once pristine suite. After discovering his tape recorder, he attempts to remember what has happened. As he listens, he has brief memories of the general mayhem that has taken place, including Gonzo threatening a waitress at a diner, himself convincing a distraught cleaning woman that they are police officers investigating a drug ring, and attempting to buy an orangutan. Duke drops Gonzo off at the airport, driving right up to the airplane, before returning to the hotel one last time to finish his article. He then speeds back to Los Angeles.

== Cast ==
- Johnny Depp as Raoul Duke
- Benicio del Toro as Dr. Gonzo
- Ellen Barkin as The Waitress at North Star Cafe
- Craig Bierko as Lacerda
- Gary Busey as The Highway Patrolman (H. Sulliven by name tag)
- Cameron Diaz as The Blonde TV Reporter
- Flea as Hippie
- Mark Harmon as The Magazine Reporter at Mint 400
- Katherine Helmond as The Desk Clerk at Mint Hotel
- Michael Jeter as Dr. L. Ron Bumquist
- Lyle Lovett as The Road Person
- Tobey Maguire as The Hitchhiker
- Chris Meloni as Sven, Flamingo Hotel Clerk
- Christina Ricci as Lucy
- Harry Dean Stanton as The Judge
- Tim Thomerson as Hoodlum
- Larry Cedar as Car Rental Agent – Los Angeles
- Richard Riehle as Dune Buggy Driver
- Richard Portnow as Wine Colored Tuxedo
- Steve Schirripa as Goon
- Larry Brandenburg as Cop in Back
- Jennifer Elise Cox as Shopper
- Kim Flowers as Lizard Performer
- Tane McClure as Lizard Performer
- Michael Lee Gogin as Uniformed Dwarf

=== Cameos ===
- Troy Evans as Police Chief
- Debbie Reynolds as Herself (voice)
- Jenette Goldstein as Alice the Maid
- Verne Troyer as Wee Waiter
- Gregory Itzin as Mint Hotel Clerk
- Laraine Newman as Frog-Eyed Woman
- Penn Jillette as Bazooko Circus Barker
- Hunter S. Thompson as Older Raoul Duke in flashback

== Production ==
=== Development ===
In January 1976, Texas Monthly announced that Larry McMurtry had signed a contract to write a screenplay for a film adaptation. Martin Scorsese, Ralph Bakshi and Oliver Stone each tried to get the film off the ground, but were unsuccessful and moved on.

Rhino Films began work on a film version as early as 1992. Head of Production and the film's producer Stephen Nemeth originally wanted Lee Tamahori to direct, but he wasn't available until after the January 1997 start date. Depp wanted Bruce Robinson to direct, but he was "unavailable... by choice". Rhino appealed to Thompson for an extension on the film rights but the author and his lawyers denied the extension. Under pressure, Rhino countered by green-lighting the film and hiring Alex Cox to direct within a few days. According to Nemeth, Cox could "do it for a price, could do it quickly and could get this movie going in four months."

Rhino hired Terry Gilliam and was granted an extension from Thompson but only with the stipulation that the director made the film. Rhino did not want to commit to Gilliam in case he didn't work out. Thompson remembers, "They just kept asking for more [time]. I got kind of agitated about it because I thought they were trying to put off doing it. So I began to charge them more... I wanted to see the movie done, once it got started." The studio threatened to make the film with Cox and without Depp and del Toro. The two actors were upset when producer Laila Nabulsi told them of Rhino's plans. Universal Pictures stepped in to distribute the film. Depp and Gilliam were paid $500,000 each but the director still did not have a firm deal in place. In retaliation, Depp and Gilliam locked Rhino out of the set during filming.

=== Casting ===
During the initial development to get the film made, Jack Nicholson and Marlon Brando were originally considered for the roles of Duke and Gonzo but they both grew too old. Afterward, Dan Aykroyd and John Belushi were considered for the duo, but that fell apart when Belushi died. John Malkovich was later considered for the role of Duke, but he grew too old as well. At one point Woody Harrelson was almost cast, but was already involved in the movie Palmetto of the same year. After Hunter S. Thompson met with Johnny Depp he became convinced that no one else could play him. When Cox and Davies started writing the screenplay, Depp and del Toro committed to starring in the film.

Gilliam said in an interview that his films are actor-led, and the performance of the two characters in Fear and Loathing is hyper realistic but truthful: "I am interested in real people in bizarre, twisted environments that force them to act... to react against."

Dr. Gonzo is based on Thompson's friend Oscar Zeta Acosta, who disappeared sometime in 1974. Thompson changed Acosta's ethnic identity to "Samoan" to deflect suspicion from Acosta, who was in trouble with the Los Angeles County Bar Association. He was the "Chicano lawyer" notorious for his party binges.

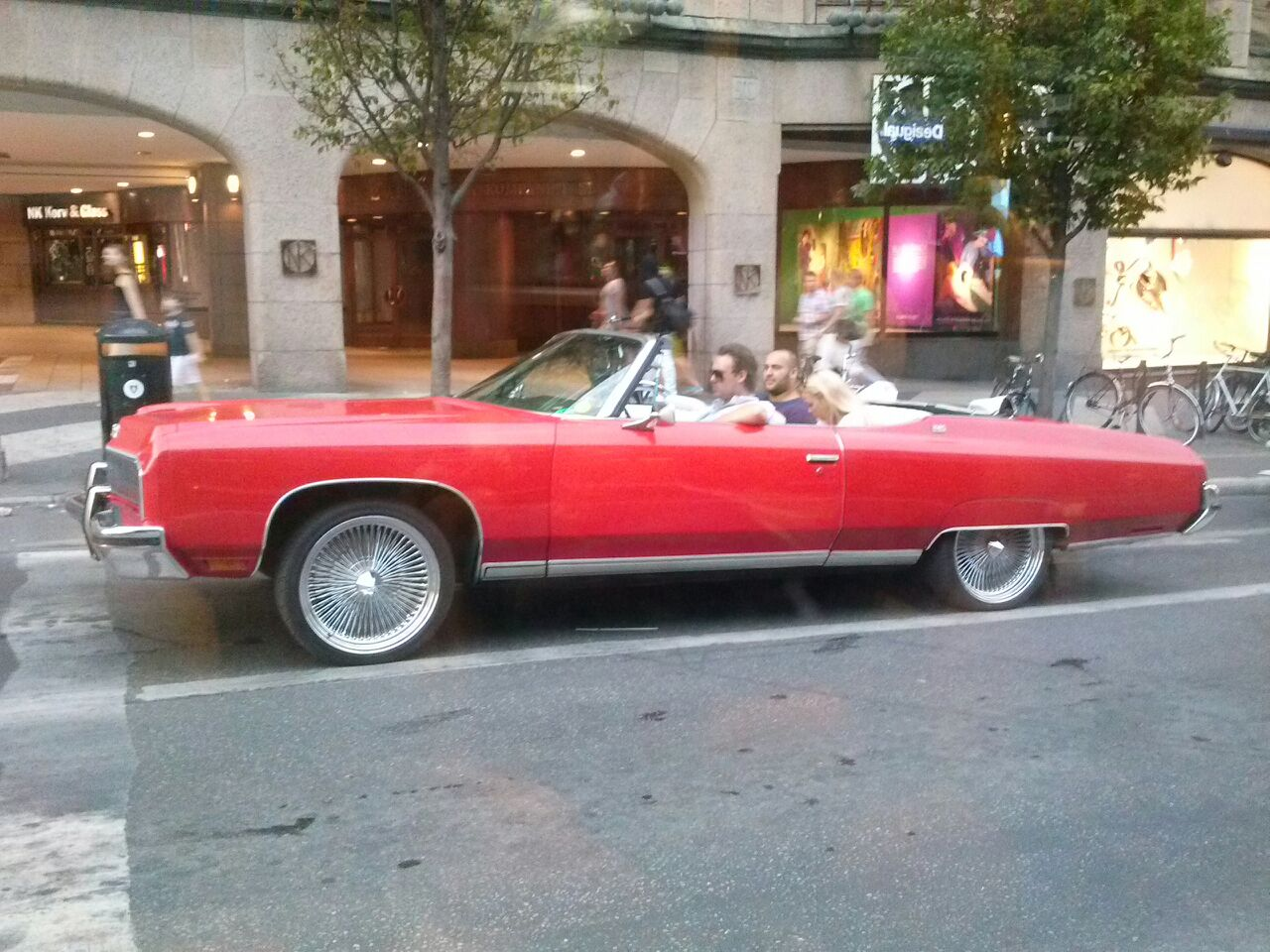
A red 1973 Chevrolet Caprice Convertible. Depp drove Thompson's red 1973 Caprice Convertible in preparation for the role

The lead actors undertook extraordinary preparations for their respective roles. Del Toro gained more than 45 pounds (18 kg) in nine weeks before filming began, eating 16 donuts a day, and extensively researched Acosta's life. In the spring of 1997, Depp moved into the basement of Thompson's Owl Farm home and lived there for four months, doing research for the role as well as studying Thompson's habits and mannerisms. The actor went through Thompson's original manuscript, mementos and notebooks that he kept during the actual trip. Depp remembers, "He saved it all. Not only is [the book] true, but there's more. And it was worse." Depp even traded his car for Thompson's red Chevrolet Caprice convertible, known to fans as The Great Red Shark, and drove it around California during his preparation for the role. Many of the costumes that Depp wears in the film are genuine articles of clothing that Depp borrowed from Thompson, and the writer himself shaved Depp's head to match his own natural male pattern baldness. Other props, such as Duke's cigarette filter (a TarGard Permanent Filter System), Hawaiian shirts, hats, a patchwork jacket, a silver medallion (given to him by Oscar Acosta) and IDs, belonged to Thompson.

Gilliam decades later described the filming of Thompson's brief cameo in the movie as a "horrible" experience due to the latter's frequent need to "be the center of attention".

=== Writing ===
Cox started writing the screenplay with Tod Davies, a UCLA Thompson scholar. During pre-production, Cox and producer Laila Nabulsi had "creative differences" and she forced Rhino to choose between her and Cox. She had an arrangement with Thompson to produce the film and the studio fired Cox and paid him $60,000 in script fees. Thompson's disapproval of the Cox/Davies script treatment is documented in the film Breakfast with Hunter.

The decision was made to not use the Cox/Davies script, which gave Gilliam only ten days to write another. Gilliam has stated in an interview "When we were writing the script, we really tried not to invent anything. We sort of cannibalized the book." The director enlisted the help of Tony Grisoni and they wrote the script at Gilliam's home in May 1997. Grisoni remembers, "I'd sit at the keyboard, and we'd talk and talk and I'd keep typing." One of the most important scenes from the book that Gilliam wanted to put in the film was the confrontation between Duke and Dr. Gonzo and the waitress of the North Star Coffee Lounge. The director said, "This is two guys who have gone beyond the pale, this is unforgivable – that scene, it's ugly. My approach, rather than to throw it out, was to make that scene the low point."

Initially, the studio wanted Gilliam to update the book for the 1990s, which he considered, "And then I looked at the film and said, 'No, that's apologizing. I don't want to apologize for this thing. It is what it is.' It's an artifact. If it's an accurate representation of that book, which I thought was an accurate representation of a particular time and place and people." Gilliam, while speaking to Sight & Sound magazine, highlighted if he had updated the movie to the 1990s it would just "be a story about two people going to excess". Keeping it set in the 70's, using the backdrop of the Vietnam War and a perceived loss of the American dream, offers reasoning to the characters' actions.

=== Writers credit dispute with WGA ===
When the film approached release, Gilliam learned that the Writers Guild of America (WGA) would not allow Cox and Davies to be removed from the credits even though none of their material was used in the production of the film. According to WGA rules, Gilliam and Grisoni had to prove that they wrote 60% of their script. The director said, "But there have been at least five previous attempts at adapting the book, and they all come from the book. They all use the same scenes." Gilliam remarked in an interview, "The end result was we didn't exist. As a director, I was automatically deemed a 'production executive' by the guild and, by definition, discriminated against. But for Tony to go without any credit would be really unfair." David Kanter, agent for Cox and Davies, argued, "About 60 percent of the decisions they made on what stays in from the book are in the film – as well as their attitude of wide-eyed anarchy." According to the audio commentary by Gilliam on the Criterion Collection DVD, during the period where it appeared that only Cox and Davies would be credited for the screenplay, the film was to begin with a short scene in which it is explained that no matter what is said in the credits, no writers were involved in the making of the film. When this changed in early May 1998 after the WGA revised its decision and gave credit to Gilliam and Grisoni first and Cox and Davies second, the short was not needed. Angered over having to share credit, Gilliam publicly burned his WGA card at a 22 May book signing on Broadway.

=== Filming ===
According to Gilliam, there was no firm budget in place when filming started. He felt that it was not a well-organized film and said, "Certain people didn't... I'm not going to name names but it was a strange film, like one leg was shorter than the other. There was all sorts of chaos." While Depp was on location in Los Angeles, he got a phone call from comedian Bill Murray who had played Thompson in Where the Buffalo Roam. He warned Depp, "Be careful or you'll find yourself ten years from now still doing him… Make sure your next role is some drastically different guy."

Shooting on location in Las Vegas began on 3 August 1997 and lasted 56 days. The production ran into problems when they wanted to shoot in a casino. They were only allowed to film between two and six in the morning, given only six tables to put extras around and insisted that the extras really gamble. Exterior shots of the Bazooko Casino were filmed in front of the Stardust hotel/casino with the interiors constructed with a Warner Bros. Hollywood soundstage. To get the period look of Vegas in the 1970s, Gilliam and Pecorini used rear-projection footage from the old television show, Vega$. According to the cinematographer, this footage heightened the film's "already otherworldly tone an extra notch."

=== Cinematography ===
Nicola Pecorini was hired based on an audition reel he sent Gilliam that made fun of the fact that he had only one eye (he lost the other to retinal cancer). According to Pecorini, the look of the film was influenced by the paintings of Robert Yarber that are "very hallucinatory: the paintings use all kinds of neon colors, and the light sources don't necessarily make sense." According to Gilliam, they used him as a guide "While mixing our palette of deeply disturbing fluorescent colors."

For the desert scenes, Pecorini wanted a specific, undefined quality without a real horizon to convey the notion that the landscape never ended and to emphasize "a certain kind of unreality outside the characters' car, because everything that matters to them is within the Red Shark." For the scene where Duke hallucinates a lounge full of lizards, the production was supposed to have 25 animatronic reptiles but they only received seven or eight. The production used motion-control techniques to make it look like they had a whole room of them and made multiple passes with the cameras outfitting the lizards with different costumes each time.

During production, it was Gilliam's intention that it should feel like a drug trip from beginning to end. He said in an interview, "We start out at full speed and it's WOOOO! The drug kicks in and you're on speed! Whoah! You get the buzz – it's crazy, it's outrageous, the carpet's moving and everybody's laughing and having a great time. But then, ever so slowly, the walls start closing in and it's like you're never going to get out of this fucking place. It's an ugly nightmare and there's no escape." To convey the effects of the various drugs, Gilliam and Pecorini assembled a list of "phases" that detailed the "cinematic qualities" of each drug consumed. For ether, Pecorini said they used a "loose depth of field; everything becomes non-defined"; for adrenochrome, "everything gets narrow and claustrophobic, move closer with lens"; mescaline was simulated by having "colors melt into each other, flares with no sources, play with color temperatures"; for amyl nitrite, the "perception of light gets very uneven, light levels increase and decrease during the shots"; and for LSD, "everything extremely wide, hallucinations via morphs, shapes, colors, and sound."

Pecorini and Gilliam decided they wanted the film to be shot wide-angle but because of the small budget they couldn't afford the downfalls of anamorphic lenses so they paired the Arriflex 535, and the Arri 35-iii with a set of Zeiss Standard Primes and Kodak's 250D Vision 5246 filmstock in order to achieve the saturated look the film has.

=== Soundtrack ===
Professional ratings
Review scores
Source	Rating
AllMusic	link

The music belongs to the psychedelic rock and classic rock genre. The soundtrack contains songs used in the film with sound bites of the film before each song. Most of the music is present in the soundtrack with a few exceptions: the Lennon Sisters' version of "My Favorite Things" from The Sound of Music which plays at the beginning of the picture, Jefferson Airplane's "Somebody to Love" which is heard during a flashback, Beck, Bogert & Appice's "Lady", Tom Jones' "It's Not Unusual", Frank Sinatra's "You're Getting to Be a Habit with Me", Combustible Edison's "Spy vs Spy", the Out-Islanders' "Moon Mist" from Polynesian Fantasy, Robert Goulet's "My Love, Forgive Me", and a recording of "Ball and Chain" by Janis Joplin.

The Rolling Stones song "Jumping Jack Flash" is heard at the conclusion of the film as Thompson drives out of Las Vegas. Gilliam could not pay $300,000 (half of the soundtrack budget) for the rights to "Sympathy for the Devil" by the Rolling Stones, which plays a prominent role in the book.

The Dead Kennedys rendition of "Viva Las Vegas" is heard at the very end of the closing credits.

Track listing
No.	Title	Performed by	Length
1.	"Combination of the Two"	Big Brother and the Holding Company	5:47
2.	"One Toke Over the Line"	Brewer & Shipley	3:43
3.	"She's a Lady"	Tom Jones	2:53
4.	"For Your Love"	The Yardbirds	2:36
5.	"White Rabbit"	Jefferson Airplane	3:13
6.	"A Drug Score – Part 1 (Acid Spill)"	Tomoyasu Hotei & Ray Cooper	0:52
7.	"Get Together"	The Youngbloods	5:41
8.	"Mama Told Me Not to Come"	Three Dog Night	3:51
9.	"Stuck Inside of Mobile with the Memphis Blues Again"	Bob Dylan	7:27
10.	"Time Is Tight"	Booker T. & the MG's	3:29
11.	"Magic Moments"	Perry Como	3:04
12.	"A Drug Score – Part 2 (Adrenochrome, the Devil's Dance)"	Tomoyasu Hotei & Ray Cooper	2:27
13.	"Tammy"	Debbie Reynolds	3:03
14.	"A Drug Score – Part 3 (Flashbacks)"	Tomoyasu Hotei & Ray Cooper	2:26
15.	"Expecting to Fly"	Buffalo Springfield	4:17
16.	"Viva Las Vegas"	Dead Kennedys	3:23
Total length:			61:00

== Release ==
Fear and Loathing in Las Vegas underwent preview test screenings – a process that Gilliam does not enjoy. "I always get very tense in those (test screenings), because I'm ready to fight. I know the pressure from the studio is, 'somebody didn't like that, change it!'" The filmmaker said that it was important to him that Thompson like the film and recalls the writer's reaction at a screening, "Hunter watched it for the first time at the premiere and he was making all this fucking noise! Apparently it all came flooding back to him, he was reliving the whole trip! He was yelling out and jumping on his seat like it was a roller coaster, ducking and diving, shouting 'SHIT! LOOK OUT! GODDAMN BATS!' That was fantastic – if he thought we'd captured it, then we must have done it!" Thompson himself stated, "Yeah, I liked it. It's not my show, but I appreciated it. Depp did a hell of a job. His narration is what really held the film together, I think. If you hadn't had that, it would have just been a series of wild scenes."

Fear and Loathing in Las Vegas debuted at the 1998 Cannes Film Festival and Gilliam said, "I'm curious about the reaction ... If I'm going to be disappointed, it's because it doesn't make any waves, that people are not outraged."

=== Home media ===
By the time Fear and Loathing was released as a Criterion Collection DVD in 2003, Thompson showed his approval of the Gilliam version by recording a full-length audio commentary for the film and participating in several DVD special features.

On an audio commentary track in the Criterion edition of the DVD, Gilliam expresses great pride in the film and says it was one of the few times where he did not have to fight extensively with the studio during the filming. Gilliam chalks this up to the fact that many of the studio executives read Thompson's book in their youth and understood it could not be made into a conventional Hollywood film. He expresses frustration with the advertising campaign used during its initial release, which he says tried to sell it as wacky comedy. The film was released by Universal Studios on HD DVD and Blu-ray; Criterion released the film on Blu-ray on 26 April 2011, and on Ultra HD Blu-ray on 4 June 2024.

== Reception ==
=== Box office ===
The film opened in wide release on 22 May 1998 and grossed $3.3 million in 1,126 theaters on its first weekend. The film went on to gross $10.6 million, well below its budget of $18.5 million. The movie reignited interest in Thompson's novel. Vintage Press reported an initial reprint of 100,000 copies to tie in with the film's release, but demand was higher than expected and the novel was reprinted a further five times.

=== Critical response ===
Gilliam wanted to provoke strong reactions to his film as he said in an interview, "I want it to be seen as one of the great movies of all time, and one of the most hated movies of all time." Fear and Loathing in Las Vegas polarized critics; on review aggregator Rotten Tomatoes, the film holds an approval rating of 50% based on 72 reviews. The website's critical consensus reads, "Visually creative, but also aimless, repetitive, and devoid of character development." On Metacritic, the film received a score of 41 based 19 reviews, indicating "mixed or average" reviews. Audiences polled by CinemaScore gave the film an average grade of "C+" on an A+ to F scale.

In The New York Times, Stephen Holden wrote, "Even the most precise cinematic realizations of Mr. Thompson's images don't begin to match the surreal ferocity of the author's language." Stephen Hunter, in his review for The Washington Post, wrote, "It tells no story at all. Little episodes of no particular import come and go...But the movie is too grotesque to be entered emotionally." Mike Clark, of USA Today, found the film "simply unwatchable." In The Guardian, Gaby Wood wrote: "After a while, though, the ups and downs don't come frequently enough even for the audience, and there's an element of the tedium usually found in someone else's druggy experiences." Roger Ebert found the film disgraceful, giving it one star out of four and calling it:

a horrible mess of a movie, without shape, trajectory or purpose–a one joke movie, if it had one joke. The two characters wander witlessly past the bizarre backdrops of Las Vegas (some real, some hallucinated, all interchangeable) while zonked out of their minds. Humor depends on attitude. Beyond a certain point, you don't have an attitude, you simply inhabit a state.

Gene Siskel's "thumbs-up" review at the time also noted the film successfully captured the book's themes into film, adding "What the film is about and what the book is about is using Las Vegas as a metaphor for – or a location for – the worst of America, the extremes of America, the money obsession, the visual vulgarity of America." Michael O'Sullivan gave the film a positive review in The Washington Post, writing "What elevates the tale from being a mere drug chronicle is the same thing that lifted the book into the realm of literature. It's the sense that Gilliam, like Thompson, is always totally in command of the medium, while abandoning himself utterly to unpredictable forces beyond his control." Empire magazine voted the film the 469th greatest film in their "500 Greatest Movies of All Time" list. Leonard Maltin categorized it as a BOMB: "Excruciating adaptation ... simply one monotonous, painfully long drug trip—replete with closeups of vomit and swooping camera movements at any and every opportunity."

Andrew Johnston, writing in Time Out New York, observed: "Fear is really a Rorschach test of a movie – some people will see a godawful mess, rendered inaccessible by the stumbling handheld camera and Depp's nearly incomprehensible narration. Others will see a freewheeling comedy, a thinking person's Cheech and Chong film. It all depends on your mood, expectations and state of mind (for the record, I was stone sober and basically enjoyed myself)."

=== Status ===
The film has been re-screened at various cinemas such as The Prince Charles Cinema in Leicester Square, London, and a special screening from original VHS tape at Swordtail Studio London in 2016.

The increased attention for the film has also led some news outlets to reconsider the mixed original reception of the film; Scott Tobias of The A.V. Club argued in his more recent review of the film that it "would have had a greater impact had it been produced at the time, when Brewster McCloud proved that anything was possible, but short of a time machine, Gilliam does what he can to bring the era back to life."

=== Awards ===
The film was nominated for a variety of awards that both praised and condemned it. Terry Gilliam was in competition at the 1998 Cannes Film Festival, without success, while Johnny Depp won the Best Foreign Actor award from the Russian Guild of Film Critics in 1998.

However, Depp and Del Toro were also nominated by the Stinkers Bad Movie Awards for Worst On-Screen Couple, and during the same awards Del Toro's portrayal of Dr. Gonzo was also nominated for the Worst Supporting Actor.

== See also ==
- Gonzo journalism
- The Rum Diary
- Where the Buffalo Roam
- List of films featuring hallucinogens
- List of films set in Las Vegas

== Bibliography ==
- Pizzello, Stephen (May 30, 1998). "Gonzo Filmmaking". American Cinematographer. pp. 30–47.
