= Yarber =

Yarber is the surname of the following people:

- Eric Yarber (born 1963), American football coach and player
- Jack Yarber (born 1967), American singer, songwriter, and guitarist
- Robert Yarber (born 1948), American painter
- Tony Yarber (born 1978), American pastor, educator and politician
