= The Art of the Con =

2015 non-fiction book by Anthony Amore

- Author: Anthony Amore
- Language: English
- Publisher: Palgrave Macmillan
- Publication date: 2015
- ISBN: 978-1-137-27987-3 (first edition, hardcover)
- Dewey Decimal: 702.874
- LC Class: N8790 .A46

The Art of the Con is a 2015 book by Anthony Amore about forgeries, thefts, scams and fakes in the art world from the 18th century to the present time. Among those featured in the book are the scandals around Lawrence Salander and the Knoedler gallery. It was published by Palgrave Macmillan.

Amore served as the director of security for the Isabella Stewart Gardner Museum where he worked with the FBI on the 1990 museum theft and previously wrote another book on art theft called Stealing Rembrandts.
