= Bettina Werner =

Italian artist based in New York City (born 1965)

- Born: 1965 (age 60–61); Milan, Italy
- Education: Brera Academy
- Known for: Painting

Bettina Werner (born in 1965, in Milan, Italy) is an Italian artist based in New York City. She has created artwork with her colorized salt technique since the early 1980s. Werner became an American citizen in July 2010 and now bears dual citizenship.

== Life and work ==
Werner was born in Milan where studied at the Academy of Fine Arts of Brera. In 1989 she relocated to New York.

Salt's crystallized texture intrigued Werner and encouraged her to explore different combinations of textures and colors creating a unique and signature artistic language. Her first exhibition in New York was at the Marisa Del Re Gallery in 1990.

Her salt paintings, sculptures, art installations and functional pieces of artwork, such as her salt sculpture-table, salt sculpture-bed and salt sculpture-backgammon boards are exhibited in museums and galleries extensively throughout Europe, Russia and the United States, including the Whitney Museum, the Pushkin Museum in Moscow, the Detroit Institute of Art, Las Vegas Art Museum, Chase Manhattan Bank, the collection of Herbert and Dorothy Vogel, and the collection of Martin Margulies in Miami.

In 2002, she founded The Salt Queen Foundation in New York, a non-profit educational institution. Its goals include the celebration of artists who use innovative techniques and unusual materials. The institution is dedicated to the support, conservation, and protection of works of art created with Werner's unique textured and colorized salt technique invented in the 1980s. Furthermore, the foundation aims to promote the education of the value and importance of salt in the history of humanity and as a new art form, as well as to encourage the values utilized by other innovative artists working with different and extraordinary media.

Reviews and features on her work have appeared in The New York Times, and The Wall Street Journal,

== Books ==
- Bettina Werner: Queen of Salt. Milan, Leonardo Arte, 1999. ISBN 88-7813-322-1

== Periodicals ==
- VV. AA. (1993): "An Exhibition of Work by Contemporary Italian Artists", Frederick R. Weisman Museum of Art Magazine
- Gianluca Bauzano, (2000) "Bettina, The Manhattan Queen of Salt", Audry Magazine
- Gianluca Bauzano, (1998) "Artisti Italiani a New York", Amica Magazine
- Elisa Turner, (1991) "New Paintings by Bettina Werner", The Miami Herald
- Marta Citacov, (1996) "Bettina Werner, Toccare con mano", L'Uomo Vogue
- Francesca Bonazzoli, (1996) "Cristalli di sale nei colori di Bettina Werner", Corriere della Sera
- Giorgio Bonomi, (1998) "Spazio, colore, superficie nella pittura di Bettina Werner", Arte in Umbria
- Eleonora Attolico, (1998) "Americana per abilita' straordinarie", Soprattutto
- Eleonora Attolico, (1999) "Tibino, la mia musa fedele", L'Espresso
- Gina Avogadro, (1990) "Andiamo in barca al Museo", Il Giorno
- Irene Silverman, (2003) "Bettina Werner: The Queen of Salt", The East Hampton Star
- Antonio Carlucci, (2000) "Regina in mostra", L'Espresso Magazine
- Marta Citacov, (2003) "Se il padrone e' un divo", GQ
- Luisella Seveso, (2008) "Bettina, la Regina del Sale ha conquistato New York", Il Giorno
- Achille Bonito Oliva, (1991) "Bettina Werner at Marisa del Re Gallery New York", Flash Art, no.161
- Maria Balliana (1989) "Bettina Werner, il sale dell'arte", Italia Oggi
