= Robert Yarber =

American artist

- Born: November 18, 1948 (age 77); Dallas, Texas
- Education: BFA Cooper Union, MFA Louisiana State University
- Known for: Painting

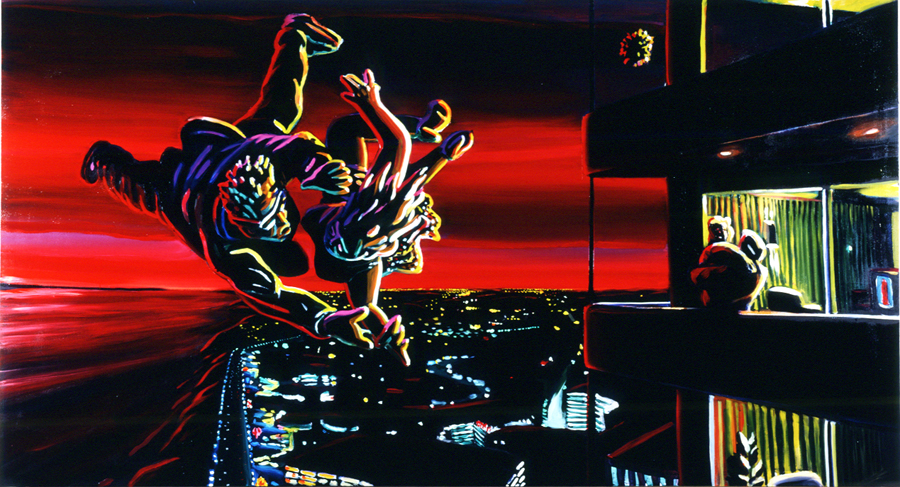
Big Fall, 1984. Oil on canvas, Whitney Museum collection

Robert Yarber (born Dallas, Texas, 1948) is an American painter and Professor of Art at Pennsylvania State University. He received a BFA from Cooper Union in 1971, and an MFA from Louisiana State University in 1973.

Yarber gained international attention when his work was included in "Paradise Lost/Paradise Regained: American Visions of the New Decade", an exhibit organized by the New Museum for display in the American Pavilion at the 41st Venice Biennale in 1984. At the Venice Biennale, he was one of twenty-four artists (including Roger Brown, Rev. Howard Finster, Cheryl Laemmle, Jedd Garet, April Gornik, and Eric Fischl) represented in the United States pavilion. Yarber gained further prominence with his inclusion in the Whitney Biennial in 1985. In 1990, Yarber, along with artists Janet Woolley, Jenny Holzer and the illustrators Lou Brooks and Marvin Mattelson, participated in an MTV advertising campaign in Rolling Stone magazine that allowed them the freedom to create an illustration without specific requirements.

Yarber has been credited with influencing the Terry Gilliam film Fear and Loathing in Las Vegas (1998). According to cinematographer Nicola Pecorini, the look of the film was influenced by Yarber's paintings that are "Very hallucinatory: the paintings use all kinds of neon colors, and the light sources don't necessarily make sense." According to Gilliam, they used him as a guide "While mixing our palette of deeply disturbing fluorescent colors."

He has been represented by the Sonnabend Gallery in New York, Marella Arte Contemporanea in Milan, Modernism Inc. in San Francisco, Reflex Amsterdam, Amsterdam, Nicodim Gallery in Los Angeles, and other galleries in the United States and Europe. His most recent show Return of the Repressed opened for Los Angeles’s Nicodim Gallery in 2018. Its coverage has been featured in various art publications including Autre Magazine and Artillery Magazine. Critic Annabel Osberg of Artillery writes, “Robert Yarber‘s spellbinding nocturnal realms feel at once familiar and otherworldly, each of his paintings is far weirder than the sum of its parts, with generic characters and unplaceable urban locales coalescing into bizarre, morbid scenarios.” His 2013 work Panic Pending inspired a collaboration with literary theorist Herbert Marks, who published a piece The Ugly Baby and the Beautiful Corpse: Robert Yarber’s Gnostic Comedy in that year’s Yearbook of Comparative Literature.

Yarber is perhaps best known for a series of paintings of flying and falling figures seen above cityscapes viewed at night. Yarber's works revolve around "combining antiquity with modernism." Two recent shows at Sonnabend Gallery in New York have highlighted Yarber's integration of non dual Vedanta and Upper Amazonian Shamanism into his drawings and paintings. A graphic fiction is in the works based on the most recent show, "Irrational Exuberance."
