= Sedrick Huckaby =

American artist (born 1975)

- Born: 1975 (age 50–51)
- Education: Boston University (BFA, 1997), Yale (MFA, 1999)
- Known for: Large-scale paintings evoking quilts
- Spouse: Letitia Huckaby

Sedrick Ervin Huckaby (born 1975) is an American artist known for his use of thick, impasto paint to create murals that evoke traditional quilts and his production of large portraits that represent his personal history through images of family members and neighbors.

== Biography ==
Huckaby is a native of Fort Worth, Texas. As a child, Huckaby spent time drawing characters from TV shows such as Teenage Mutant Ninja Turtles and Battlestar Galactica. While in high school, he attended classes at the Modern Art Museum, where he met fellow artist Ron Tomlinson, who encouraged Huckaby to pursue art as a career. He studied art at Texas Wesleyan University before receiving a Bachelor of Fine Arts from Boston University in 1997 and a Master of Fine Arts from Yale University in 1999. He has lectured on the Grant Hill Collection of African American Art at the Dallas Museum of Art, and through The Artist's Eye series at the Kimbell Art Museum in Fort Worth. He is currently an associate professor of painting in the Department of Art and Art History at UT Arlington, where he has been teaching since 2009. He is married to artist Letitia Huckaby and has three children.

== Works ==
Opal Lee (2023), National Portrait Gallery, Washington, D.C.

Huckaby has worked with images from quilts for many years, moving them from background components of portraits into the subject of his work. He was interviewed about his quilt-influenced abstract work in a podcast for Painters Table.

His 2008 series Big Momma's House includes 65 paintings, pastels, and drawings created over a two-year period. The focus of this collection is his maternal grandmother, Hallie Beatrice Carpenter, the matriarch of his family and more affectionately known as "Big Momma". His work "A Love Supreme (Spring)" is based on the jazz song of the same name by John Coltrane, and depicts a series of quilts draped across the canvas emphasizing weight and texture. In this mural sized-oil painting, the painted folds of brightly colored fabrics mimic the rhythm and syncopation of Coltrane's jazz hit while paying homage to his grandmother's traditional African-American quilts. His series The 99% - Highand Hills is a collection of portraits inspired by the 2011 Occupy Wall Street movement, showcasing the economic disparities of the U.S. population through sketches of community members alongside quotes from each person. Huckaby's paintings are featured in a February 2020 issue of National Geographic, on a story of Clotilda, the last known slave ship to reach the U.S. in 1860.

His work is on display at the San Francisco Museum of Modern Art, the Whitney Museum of American Art, the Museum of Fine arts in Boston, the Minneapolis Institute of Art, The Art Institute of Chicago, the Nasher Museum of Art at Duke University, and the Blanton Museum of Art.

== Awards and distinctions ==
In 1999, Huckaby was awarded the Kate Neal Kinley Memorial Fellowship from the University of Illinois, Urbana-Champaign, Illinois. He was awarded the Alice Kimball English Traveling Fellowship from Yale University in 1999 which funded his travels to study the works of Henry Tanner. Again in 1999 he was awarded the Provincetown Fellowship from the Fine Arts Work Center and subsequently spent six months making work there. In 2001, he was awarded the Best of Show and subsequently held a solo exhibition for the 20th Carrol Harris Simms National Black Art Competition and Exhibition at the African American Museum in Dallas, Texas.

In 2004, Huckaby was awarded a Joan Mitchell Foundation Painters and Sculptors Grant, which is given to acknowledge “painters and sculptors creating work of exceptional quality through unrestricted career support”. In 2004 he also received the Beth Lea Clardy Memorial Award (first place) at Art in the Metroplex in Fort Worth, Texas. In 2008 he received a Guggenheim Fellowship, one of the most prestigious art grants in the nation.

In 2014 Huckaby received the Visiting Artist Residency and Fellowship through the Brandywine Workshop as well as the Davidson Family Fellowship sponsored by Amon Carter Museum of American Art. In 2016, he was one of the winners of the Outwin Boochever Portrait Competition, which is hosted by The Smithsonian's National Portrait Gallery.

In 2017 he received the 2016 Moss/Chumley North Texas Artist Award, which is given annually by the Meadows Museum at Southern Methodist University in Dallas.

He was named the 2018 Texas State Visual Artist in the 2D (painting and drawing) category.

In 2018, Huckaby won the arts and letters award in art from the American Academy of Arts and Letters.

== Exhibitions ==
Selected solo exhibitions

- 2021 – Sedrick Huckaby, Blanton Museum of Art, Austin, Texas
- 2016 – The 99%- Highland Hills, Amon Carter Museum of American Art, Fort Worth, Texas
- 2012 – Faith & Family: Sedrick Huckaby, The Grace Museum, Abilene, Texas
- 2008 – Sedrick Huckaby: A Love Supreme, Danforth Museum of Art, Framingham, Massachusetts
- 2008 – Sedrick Huckaby: Big Momma's House, Valley House Gallery, Dallas, Texas
- 2008- Legacy: The Paintings of Sedrick Huckaby, Hammonds House Museum and Resource Center of African American Art, Atlanta, Georgia
- 2006- Sedrick Huckaby: Quilts and Portraits, Nielsen Gallery, Boston, Massachusetts
- 2006- Sedrick Huckaby, The Greenville County Museum, Greenville, South Carolina
- 2006- Sedrick Huckaby, Galveston Arts Center, Galveston, Texas
- 2006- Sedrick Huckaby, San Angelo Museum of Fine Arts, San Angelo, Texas
- 2006- Sedrick Huckaby, Masur Museum of Art, Monroe, Louisiana
- 2006- Sedrick Huckaby: National Black Fine Art Fair, New York, New York (Valley House Gallery
- 2005- Sedrick Huckaby: Portraits and Quilts, Valley House Gallery, Dallas, Texas
- 2003- A Love Supreme, African American Museum, Dallas, Texas
- 2003- A Place Between Abstraction and Representation: Sedrick Huckaby, Carillon Gallery, Tarrant County College, Fort Forth, Texas
- 2002- Sedrick Huckaby- Recent Work, Burlington Northern Santa Fe Corporation, Fort Worth, Texas
- 2001- Fragments from Life, Evelyn Siegel Gallery, Fort Worth, Texas
- 2000- Recent Paintings, Fine Arts Work Center, Provincetown, Massachusetts
- 1999- Kate Neal Kinley Fellowship Show, University of Illinois, Urbana-Champaign, Illinois
- 1999- Sedrick Huckaby: Paintings, Wendell Street Gallery, Boston, Massachusetts
- 1997- Miracle of Life, Wendell Street Gallery, Boston, Massachusetts

== Selected collections ==
- Sedrick Huckaby at the Minneapolis Institute of Art, Minneapolis, Minnesota
- Fort Worth Central Library, Fort Worth, Texas
- African American Museum, Dallas, Texas
