= Herb and Dorothy =

Herb & Dorothy
- Directed by: Megumi Sasaki
- Produced by: Megumi Sasaki
- Starring: Paula Antebi; Will Barnet
- Edited by: Bernadine Colish
- Music by: David Majzlin
- Release date: January 28, 2008
- Running time: 87 minutes
- Country: United States
- Language: English
- Box office: $194,721

Herb and Dorothy is a 2008 documentary film by Megumi Sasaki. The film tells the story of two middle-class collectors of contemporary art, Herbert and Dorothy Vogel, and the enormous and valuable collection of conceptual art and minimalist art they amassed in spite of their relatively meager salaries as New York City civil servants. Many artists are interviewed in the film, including Christo, Chuck Close, Robert Mangold, and Pat Steir.

As of September 2009, the film had made $194,721 at the box office.

== Awards ==
- 2008 Audience Award for Best Documentary, Hamptons International Film Festival
- 2008 Golden Starfish Documentary Feature Award, Hamptons International Film Festival
- 2008 Audience Award, Silverdocs Documentary Festival
- 2008 Audience Award for Best Documentary, Philadelphia Film Festival
- 2009 HBO Audience Award, Best Documentary, Provincetown International Film Festival
