= Andrea Gill (artist) =

American ceramist

Andrea Gill (born 1948) is an American ceramist.

== Biography ==
Gill was born in Newark, New Jersey. She studied at the Rhode Island School of Design, where she received a BFA degree. She studied at Kansas City Art Institute. In 1976 she received an MFA degree from the New York State College of Ceramics at Alfred University.

She taught at NY State College of Ceramics at Alfred University.

Her work is included in the collections of the Nora Eccles Harrison Museum of Artt, Philadelphia Museum of Art, Smithsonian American Art Museum, Victoria and Albert Museum, and the Museum of Fine Arts, Houston.

== Bibliography ==
- Gill, Andrea. “My Approach to Glaze.” Ceramics Monthly (December 1995).
- Gill, Andrea. “Majolica Glazes: A Collection of Formulas.” Ceramics Monthly (December 1995).
