= Cheryl Laemmle =

American painter (born 1947)

Targets by Cheryl Laemmle, 1992, oil on canvas, Honolulu Museum of Art

Cheryl Laemmle (born 1947) is an American contemporary surrealist painter of figures, animals, and imaginary landscapes.

== Biography ==
She is a native of Minneapolis, Minnesota who received her bachelor's degree from Humboldt State University in 1974 and her Master of Fine Arts degree from Washington State University in 1978. She was the recipient of a Creative Artists Public Service Program Fellowship in 1980, the Vera G. List Award for distinguished achievement in the visual arts in 1984, and a fellowship from the National Endowment for the Arts in 1985. Her work has been exhibited widely in solo and group shows both in the United States and abroad; she was one of twenty-four artists to represent the United States at the 1984 Venice Biennale.

Laemmle's style has been described both as surrealism and as magic realism. Targets, in the collection of the Honolulu Museum of Art, demonstrates the artist's style. The Fogg Art Museum, the Honolulu Museum of Art, the Rhode Island School of Design Museum of Art, the Birmingham Museum of Art, the Metropolitan Museum of Art, the Walker Art Gallery, KMAC Museum, and the Whitney Museum of American Art, are among the public collections holding works by Cheryl Laemmle.

== Exhibitions ==
Laemmle's work is in the collections of the Corcoran Gallery of Art, Washington, D.C., and the Metropolitan Museum of Art, New York City.

Laemmle's solo exhibitions include P.S. 1 Special Projects Room (1980) in Long Island, Texas Gallery (1982) in Houston, and Barbara Toll Fine Arts (1983) in New York.

Her work, Monkey with Angel, (1982) in the Fogg Art Museum was influenced by her time spent in the Adirondacks, the toys her grandfather carved for her out of birch, as well as Joseph Cornell's box assemblages.

== Reviews ==
The New York Times art critic John Russell reviewed Laemmle's work in a March 19, 1982 issue about the "New Work/ New York'' exhibit at the New Museum.

== Recognition ==
Laemmle has received a variety of awards, including Creative Artists Public Service Program Fellowship (1980), Vera G. List Award, for distinguished achievement in the visual arts (1984), and National Endowment for the Arts grant (1985).

== Personal life ==
Cheryl Laemmle is married to Michael Lucero, a New York ceramic sculptor. Laemmle and Lucero were both close to the Vogels, an art collecting couple, as they collected at least twenty works by Laemmle. Laemmle painted Pek for Herb - Happy Birthday as a gift to Herbert Vogel.
