= Letitia Huckaby =

American photographer (born 1972)

Carita Letitia Huckaby
- Born: Carita Letitia Jenkins; 1972 (age 53–54)
- Education: University of Oklahoma; University of North Texas
- Occupation: Photographer
- Known for: Multi-media artwork
- Spouse: Sedrick Huckaby
- Website: www.letitiahuckaby.com

Carita Letitia Huckaby (née Jenkins, born 1972) is an American photographer who creates multimedia artwork combining photography and textiles to depict both family narratives and African-American history.

== Life and education ==
Huckaby's studied modern dance at Quarts Mountain, Oklahoma Summers Arts Institute, in 1988 and 1989. This is where she was first exposed to photography as an art form. She studied journalism with a focus on advertising at the University of Oklahoma. In 2001, she returned to school and earned a BFA focusing on art photography from The Art Institute of Boston in 2001. During her time in Boston, she staged her first show, began working as a photographer, and received awards and scholarships.

After earning her degree in Boston, she worked as a freelance journalist for newspapers and school systems in the Dallas/Fort Worth region, where she photographed babies, sports, and weddings. She married painter Sedrick Huckaby, and had her first child. After this, Huckaby returned to the University of North Texas, where she earned an MFA in photography in 2010.

== Career ==
Huckaby was one of the artists selected by independent curators to participate in the 2013 Texas Biennial, which showcases "the best emerging and established visual artists in Texas." Her works have been shown at the Dallas Contemporary; the Galveston Arts Center in Galveston, Texas; Renaissance Fine Art in Harlem, New York; the McKenna Museum in New Orleans; the Tyler Museum of Art; and the Dallas African-American Museum. Her work is part of the permanent collections of the Art Museum of Southeast Texas in Beaumont, the Samella Lewis Contemporary Art Collection at Scripps College in Claremont, California, and the Brandywine Workshop in Philadelphia, Pennsylvania. She has also given public lectures at the Fort Worth Contemporary Arts Center and the Dallas Contemporary.

Huckaby has also created public art projects, including a piece along the Trinity River in Fort Worth at the 4th Street trailhead, one at the Ella Mae Shamblee Branch library in Fort Worth, and an installation of glass panels at the new Highland Hills Branch Library in Dallas, which reveals silhouettes of community members above the library's main entrance. She co-founded Kinfolk House, a collaborative project space housed in a historic, hundred year-old home in Fort Worth, in the neighborhood of Polytechnic. She was named the Texas Artist of the Year in 2022.

Letitia Huckaby is represented by the Talley Dunn Gallery, Dallas.

=== Solo exhibitions ===
Bayou Baroque: The mixing of materials to reveal historical topics is exemplified by this 2015 exhibit honoring the nuns at the Sisters of the Holy Family Mother House in New Orleans, Louisiana. The pieces present black women with the same solemn compositional weight as that shown in older master religious paintings. At the same time, the works echo the flowered backgrounds of Kehinde Wiley's contemporary portraits, but bring a domestic twist to the flat plains.

Beautiful Blackness: This one-woman show was exhibited at the new Foto Relevance Gallery in the Houston Museum District in 2020. The exhibition involves works drawn from multiple portfolios by the artist and taps deep into the historical entanglements surrounding African American life in the rural American South. Huckaby describes it as an exploration of the remains of Freedmen's towns across the south and following the path of the Exodusters.

5 Paperdolls: A Contemporary Tale: This exhibition, first shown in 2020, is a body of works created by Huckaby inspired by the 16th Street Baptist Church bombing of September 15, 1963. The explosion resulted in the deaths of four children, with dozens of others left wounded.

A Tale of Two Greenwoods: This project was executed and exhibited in 2020.

This Same Dusty Road: This 2020 exhibition examines Huckaby's own faith, family, and cultural heritage in Louisiana, with much of the involved art coming from her memories of family who lived along Louisiana Highway 19. Through these works, Huckaby looks into her own family, particularly the women, and confronting past and present inequities while composing her pieces to evoke old masterworks and altar pieces.

And Thy Neighb(our): This 2020 exhibition, for which the title was derived from Luke 10:27 ("He answered, “‘Love the Lord your God with all your heart and with all your soul and with all your strength and with all your mind’[a]; and, ‘Love your neighbor as yourself."), focuses on essential concepts of the twenty-first century such as community, the collective, home, and identity.

Bitter Waters Sweet: In this 2022 exhibition, Huckaby looks at the legacy of Africatown, a historic Black community near Mobile, Alabama. The Clotilda, the ship that had brought them as slaves from Africa, was scuttled in Mobile Bay in 1860 after delivering in order to their conceal illegal activity. The wreckage has since been rediscovered and is the subject of archaeological research. The Talley Dunn Gallery divides the involved artworks into four categories: Water/Landscapes, Ancestors, Descendants, and Africatown.

=== Group exhibitions ===
Make Art with Purpose 2020 (MAP2020): The Further We Roll, The More We Gain: This arts festival celebrated the centennial of the 19th amendment to the United States Constitution, which protected American citizen's right to vote without regard to their gender. Nineteen female artists and writers were commissioned for and involved in the festival. They participated in exhibitions, public lectures, workshops, a procession, and educational events that explored themes linked with the 19th amendment or celebrated women who were influential in their lives or society.

State of the Art 2020: This exhibition consisted of over 100 artworks by 61 different artists, including Letitia Huckaby. The show focused on the cross-sectionality of the artists as they explored subjects such as the creating of real and imagined spaces, connections and relationships with landscapes and power, the concept of time and how it is perceived, and thoughts of home, family, immigration, and a sense of place.

Emancipation: The Unfinished Project of Liberation: This 2023 exhibition opened during the 160th anniversary of the Emancipation Proclamation. The seven artists involved showed works that responded to John Quincy Adams Wards' bronze sculpture The Freedman, depicting a man on the cusp of liberation, his chains broken but still around his wrists, as though a reminder of his enslavement. Huckaby's chosen work was her 2022 print Ms. Angela and the Baby.

=== Series/collections ===
- Bitter Waters Sweet
- A Tale of Two Greenwoods
- And Thy Neighb(our)
- 5 Paperdolls: A Contemporary Tale
- Suffer Rage
- Beautiful Blackness
- 40 Acres... Gumbo Ya Ya
- Bayou Baroque
- Shop Rags
- Sugar Sacks
- Flour
- LA 19
- Dress Project
- Quilts
