= Terry Winters =

American painter

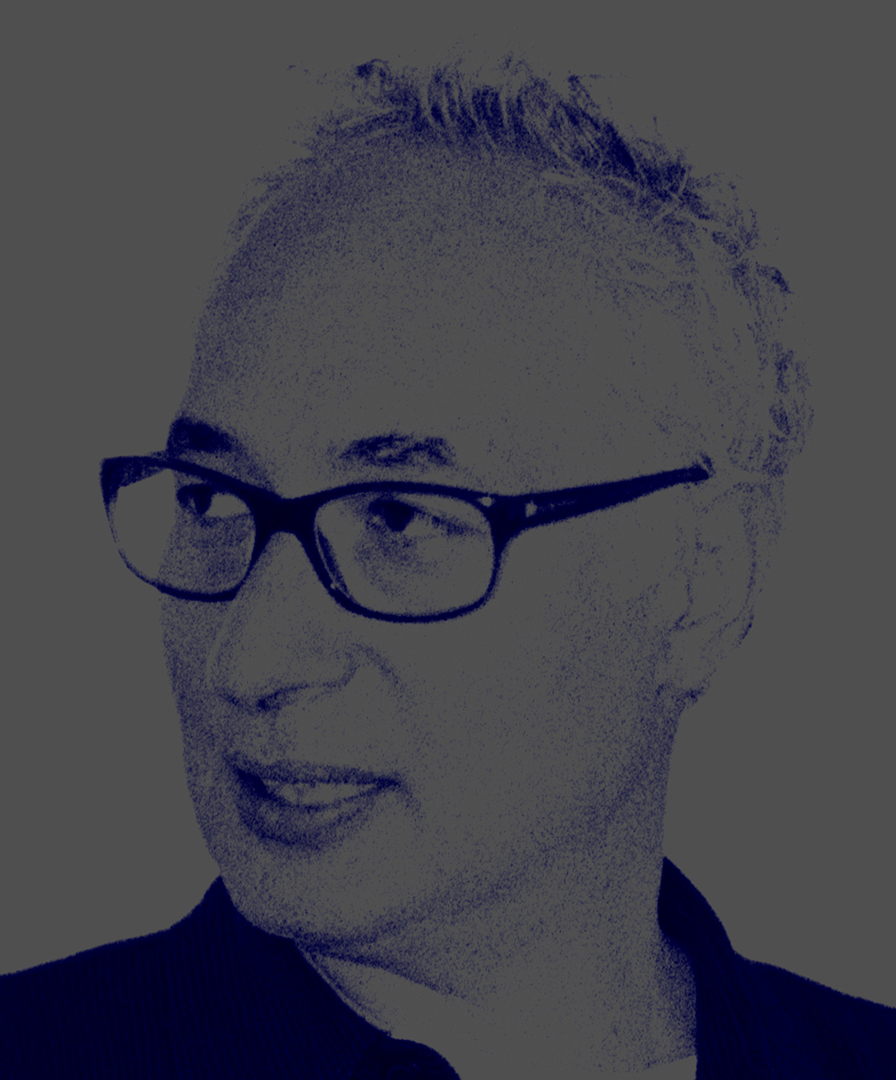
Terry Winters, New York City, September 2001

Terry Winters, Dumb Compass, 1985, oil on linen, 94 × 132 inches

Terry Winters (born 1949, Brooklyn, NY) is an American painter, draughtsman, and printmaker whose nuanced approach to the process of painting has addressed evolving concepts of spatiality and expanded the concerns of abstract art. His attention to the process of painting and investigations into systems and spatial fields explores both non-narrative abstraction and the physicality of modernism. In Winters’ work, abstract processes give way to forms with real word agency that recall mathematical concepts and cybernetics, as well as natural and scientific worlds.

== Life and work ==
Originally from Brooklyn, NY, Terry Winters studied at the Pratt Institute where he earned his B.F.A. in 1971. Interested in Minimalism and its exploration of painting's conventions, Winters began to think against the reductive tendencies of the then dominant Formalist abstraction while maintaining hard-won modernist sensibility of non-narrative abstraction.

For ten years following his graduation from the Pratt Institute Winters worked quietly and deliberately, not showing his work publicly and watched quietly by a small group of fellow artists, including Jasper Johns. During this time, Winters explored his interest in Process Art, collecting books on pigments such as Pliny the Elder’s Natural History. These studies, combined with his interest in building paintings ″from the ground up″, led him to explore making his own pigments, introducing him to the study of biology and mineralogy (and eventually to empirical information systems) and these fields’ associative and metaphoric potential.

In 1977, Winters had a significant encounter with landscape while he lived in New Mexico to help construct the earthwork Lightning Field by Walter de Maria.

By the late 1970s, Winters was using pigment to investigate the referential nature of painting. Soon after, his focus shifted to the illusionism inevitable in painting, how mark making and process create illusions that give way to non-representational spatial dimension. This approach is evident in Winters’ first exhibition in 1982 at Sonnabend Gallery. Here, gestures and modules create complex paths and grounds that premiere Winters’ nuanced painting method.

Terry Winters has since exhibited widely, joining a group of contemporaries – such as Tony Cragg, Bill Jensen, and Stephen Mueller – engaging with organic abstraction and constantly changing thought on visuality impacted by evolving technology. Throughout the 1990s and onward the scale of Winters’ work and its visual complexity has grown considerably. Continuing to take from the natural sciences and information systems, amongst other subject matters, the construction of his compositions has transitioned from occupied fields to plaited grids and networks that offer unpredictable images. Winters reforms his subjects to maintain their resonance and referentiality – what one sees in his compositions is ambiguously familiar – while waxing to an analog for the act of their making.

== Exhibitions ==
The paintings, drawings, and prints of Terry Winters have been the subject of numerous solo and group exhibitions, including major retrospectives at the Whitney Museum of American Art, the Irish Museum of Modern Art, and the Metropolitan Museum of Art.

Sonnabend Gallery, 1982

The first solo show for Terry Winters. Previously unknown outside of underground circles of artists and collectors, this debut presented his approach to painting – including his evolving lexicon of biomorphic forms and drafting skills.

Whitney Museum of American Art, 1992

This early 1990s survey demonstrates a perceptible evolution in Terry Winters’ work as he frequently shifts from large to small scales and reorients his compositions. The exhibition outlines Winters’ experimentation with printmaking and drawing after 1986 that realized new tonal and mark making potential in his work. Mining graphics and functional analytical tools, diagrams and schema like the architectural grid appear abstracted and occupied by ambiguous forms analogous to the outside world (Dumb Compass, 1985). A centerpiece of the exhibition, Spine Series (1980) simultaneously demonstrates Winters’ interest in the construction of the painting and his investigations into visuality. Later work in the exhibition features complex but singular forms emerging from fields and grounds to take on emotional dimension, evoking consciousness and sensuality (Tone, 1989).

== Books ==
- Winters, Terry. Filters in Stock. New York:& Sequences. Waterville, Maine: Colby College Museum of Art, 2006.
- Winters, Terry. Terry Winters: 1981–1986. New York: Matthew Marks Gallery, 2004.
- Winters, Terry. Terry Winters: Drawings. Munich: Staatliche Graphische Sammlung München, 2004.
- Winters, Terry. Terry Winters: Drawings. New York: Matthew Marks Gallery, 2001.
- Winters, Terry. Graphic Primitives. New York: Matthew Marks Gallery, 1999.
- Winters, Terry. Intersections and Animations. New York: Dome Editions, 1998.
- Winters, Terry. Terry Winters: Computation of Chains. New York: Matthew Marks Gallery, 1997.
- Winters, Terry. Ocular Proofs. New York: Dome Editions, 1995.
