= Nielsen Gallery =

Art gallery in Boston, Massachusetts

Coordinates: 42.3513°N 71.0771°W

Nielsen Gallery is a commercial art gallery originally located on Newbury Street in the Back Bay area of Boston, United States. Founded in 1963 by Nina Nielsen and John Baker, the gallery won “Best Show in a Commercial Gallery in the United States,” prizes from the International Association of Art Critics, in 2005 and 2009.

Originally a frame shop that also sold Japanese prints, they began to exhibit paintings in 1973. During the 46 years that the gallery was open in its original building, and also in its current online and by-appointment incarnation, it has showcased and supported contemporary American artists, especially those creating experimental and avant-garde work. The gallery's spirit was described by Artdeal Magazine as "the warmest, most intense, most powerful and inspirational art experience north of Manhattan.”

Artists featured through the gallery have included Jackson Pollock, Joan Snyder, Dexter Lazenby, Nathalie Miebach, James Cambronne, Albert York, Arthur Dove, Marsden Hartley, Jake Berthot, John Walker, Bill Jensen, Anne Harris, Sedrick Huckaby, Gregory Amenoff, and John Lees.
