= Megumi Sasaki =

Japanese filmmaker and writer

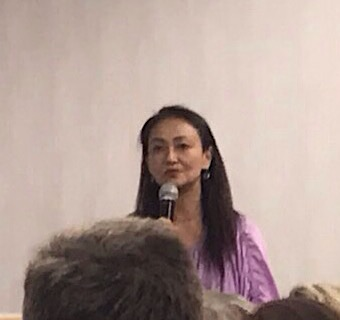
Sasaki in September 2017

Megumi Sasaki (佐々木 芽生 Sasaki Megumi, born 1962) is a Japanese filmmaker and writer. Her films include Herb and Dorothy, Herb & Dorothy 50x50, and A Whale of a Tale.

== Early life ==
Born in Sapporo, she moved to New York City in 1987 and later worked for NHK as a reporter.

== Filmmaking career ==
Sasaki's 2008 film Herb & Dorothy followed art collectors Herbert and Dorothy Vogel to document how they chose artwork for their collection. Five years later Sasaki released Herb & Dorothy 50x50, which tracked the progress of the Vogels' efforts to donate fifty pieces from their collection to each of the fifty US states, but which the Los Angeles Times called "less personal than the earlier documentary".

Sasaki's 2018 film A Whale of a Tale is a documentary about the Taiji dolphin drive hunt. It was created as a response to The Cove and includes perspectives from Japanese fishermen as well as activists. Sasaki claims that she decided to make the film when she saw The Cove win an Academy Award. The New York Times called the A Whale of a Tale "a rambling blend of complaint, tourism and straw-men arguments" while The Hollywood Reporter praised it for delivering "a thoughtful riposte to The Cove even while providing plenty of opportunity for those opposed to the practice of killing or capturing whales and dolphins to make their case". A nonfiction book by Sasaki with the same title as the film was published by Shueisha in 2017.

== Filmography ==
Year	Title	Japanese	Romanization
2010	Herb and Dorothy	ハーブ&ドロシー アートの森の小さな巨人	Hābu & Doroshī: Āto no mori no chiisana kyojin
2012	Herb & Dorothy 50x50	ハーブアンドドロシー ふたりからの贈りもの	Hābu ando Doroshī: futari kara no okurimono
2017	A Whale of a Tale	おクジラさま ふたつの正義の物語	Okujirasama: Futatsu no seigi no monogatari

== Bibliography ==
- Okujirasama: Futatsu no seigi no monogatari (おクジラさま ふたつの正義の物語, A Whale of a Tale), 2017, Shueisha, ISBN 9784087816082
