= David Majzlin =

David Majzlin is an Emmy®-nominated composer whose credits include numerous critically acclaimed films such as The Loving Story, Youth Knows No Pain, and Sins of My Father (Pecados De Mi Padre) for HBO, Herb and Dorothy, Stille, (Winner - Best Score - Avignon Film Festival), Being Reel, (Winner - Grand Prize - Project Greenlight Competition), and Shenandoah ( Louverture Films, Netflix), directed by Pulitzer Prize-winning photographer, David Turnley. He also wrote additional music for Diana Vreeland: The Eye Has to Travel (Samuel Goldwyn Films, Venice Film Festival, Toronto International Film Festival), Sunshine Cleaning (Nomination - Grand Jury Prize - Sundance Film Festival) - starring Amy Adams, Emily Blunt, and Alan Arkin, and source music for The Ghost Writer (dir., Roman Polanski, starring Ewan McGregor, Pierce Brosnan, Kim Cattrall), All Good Things (dir., Andrew Jarecki, starring Ryan Gosling, Kirsten Dunst, Frank Langella), and The Joneses (starring Demi Moore, David Duchovny, Lauren Hutton).

His music has appeared in numerous television projects and promos including Ugly Betty, CSI, The Cleaner, The Ghost Whisperer, Grey's Anatomy, The Tony Awards, CNN, Desperate Housewives, and 60 Minutes. David's commercial compositions have earned a Telly, Caddy, First London International Advertising Award, and the International Monitor Award. Theater credits include Manigma (starring Michael Aronov), Lily: Her Life, His Music (Dicapo Opera Theater) starring mezzo-soprano Audrey Babcock, and The Winter's Tale with Omar Metwally (Miral, Munich), a rock musical produced for The Rude Mechanicals Theater Company.

David has also worked with Big Beach Films, director Chris Miller (Puss in Boots, Shrek the Third), choreographers, Laura Gorenstein Miller (Helios Dance Company) and Sasha Spielvogel (Labyrinth Dance Theater), as well as recording artist Lou Reed, composer Paul Cantelon (Diving Bell and the Butterfly), and violinist Daisy Jopling (Trilogy).
