= Roxanne Pulitzer =

American celebrity and author (born 1951)

- Pulitzer in 1983
- Occupations: Actress, celebrity, author

Roxanne Pulitzer (née Renckens) is an American celebrity, author and actress.

== Career ==
Following her highly publicized divorce from newspaper heir Herbert "Peter" Pulitzer, she appeared on the June 1985 cover and interior of Playboy, for which she was reportedly paid $70,000. In the mid-1980s she worked as an aerobics instructor, according to The Los Angeles Times.

She published an autobiography in 1988: Prize Pulitzer: The Scandal That Rocked Palm Beach. The book was later adapted into a made-for-television movie, in which Ms. Pulitzer had a small role as an actress, portraying a guest at a party.

In the 1990s, she published three novels: Twins (1990), Facade (1992) and The Palm Beach Story (1995).

In 1995, Pulitzer was quoted as saying that she occasionally did freelance reporting for television shows such as Entertainment Tonight. She appeared as herself in the 2004 film Breakfast with Hunter.

== Personal life ==
Pulitzer has been married five times, according to news sources. After her first marriage ended, she married Palm Beach-based newspaper heir Herbert "Peter" Pulitzer (heir to Pulitzer, Inc.). Their twin sons Maclean Simpson Pulitzer ("Mac") and Zachary Simpson Pulitzer ("Zac") were born in 1978. Herbert divorced Roxanne in 1983, and a protracted dispute over visitation with their children ensued.

In 1992, she married again, to speedboat racer John Haggin Jr. Their marriage ended after 8 weeks. In 1995, she married land developer Harald Dude, whom she subsequently divorced.

As of 2011, she was married to Timothy S. Boberg and resided in Palm Beach.
