= Joe Andoe =

American painter and author (born 1955)

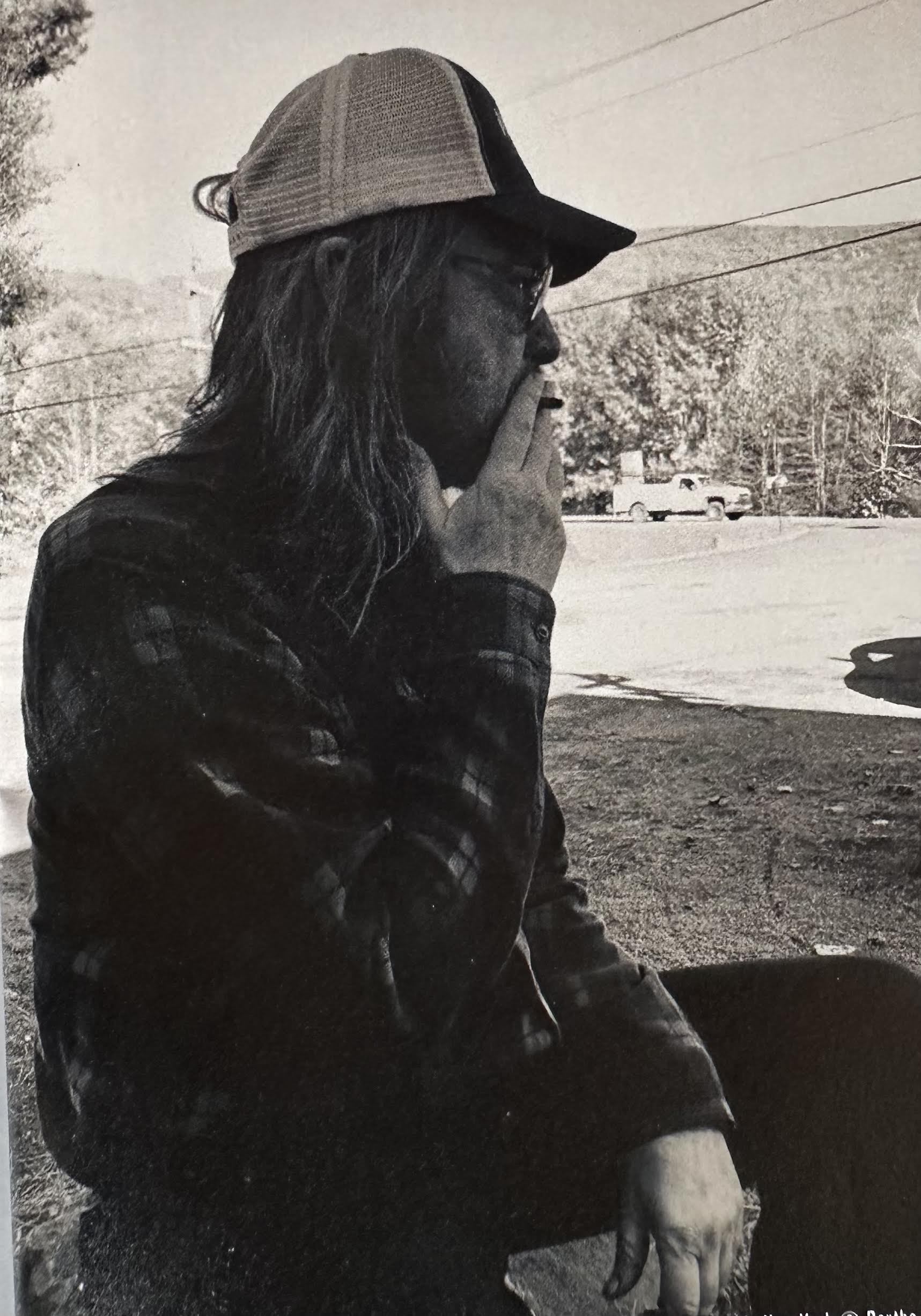
- Portrait of artist and author Joe Andoe, 2020
- Born: December 5, 1955 (age 70); Tulsa, Oklahoma
- Education: Master of Arts, University of Oklahoma, 1981
- Occupations: Painter, author
- Website: www.joeandoe.com

Joe Andoe (born December 5, 1955) is an American artist, painter, and author. His works have been featured in exhibits internationally and in museums, including the Metropolitan Museum of Art, the Museum of Fine Arts, Boston, and the Whitney Museum of American Art.

== Early life and education ==
Andoe was born in Tulsa, Oklahoma. He has written extensively about his childhood, youth, and early career in his memoir, Jubilee City: A Memoir at Full Speed (P.S.), which was published in 2007.

Andoe enjoyed drawing as a child, but did not create artwork until attending college. Andoe first realized that painting could be his career when he was enrolled in community college studying agricultural business. He was taking an elective class in art history when he learned about artists such as Robert Smithson and Dennis Oppenheim. He soon changed his major and eventually earned a Master's Degree in Art from the University of Oklahoma in 1981.

== Art career ==
Joe Andoe's paintings primarily focus on horses and landscapes. They have been described as "lean" and "roughly poetic" by art writer Deborah Solomon, who wrote in 2019 that Andoe was "an important forerunner of the photo-based realism that has become the default style among younger artists today."

The New York Times described Andoe's Me Copying Cy Twombly copying Picasso as incorporating "deadpan ... conceptual humor", which was displayed in the 2023 "Echo of Picasso" group show honoring the artist's legacy. For his part, Andoe has stated, "Since the late ’70s I have fancied myself a landscape painter, and a painter of the things that hang around on the landscape."

== Selected exhibitions and museum collections ==
=== Solo exhibitions ===
- 2023 Almine Rech Gallery, 'Echo of Picasso,' New York, NY
- 2023 Almine Rech Gallery, ‘New Paintings,’ Paris, France
- 2022 Almine Rech Gallery, ‘Chinatown,’ Shanghai, China
- 2021 Galerie Sébastien Bertrand, ‘The Catskills,’ Geneva, Switzerland
- 2017 University of Oklahoma, Fred Jones Jr. 'Horizon,' Norman, OK

=== Select public collections ===
- Dallas Museum of Art (Dallas, TX)
- Denver Museum of Art (Denver, CO)
- Detroit Institute of Arts (Detroit, MI)
- Fisher Landau Center (Long Island City, NY, NY)
- Fred Jones Jr. Museum of Art, University of Oklahoma (Norman, OK)
- The Herbert and Dorothy Vogel Collection at the National Gallery of Art (Washington, DC)
- Hood Museum of Art at Dartmouth College (Hanover, NH)
- Los Angeles County Museum of Art (Los Angeles, CA)
- Metropolitan Museum of Art (New York, NY)
- Museum of Modern Art (New York, NY)
- Museum of Fine Arts (Boston, MA)
- Saint Louis Art Museum (St. Louis, MO)
- Museum of Contemporary Art (San Diego, CA)
- Sheldon Museum of Art (Lincoln, NE)
- Whitney Museum of American Art (New York, NY)

== Writing career ==
Andoe had his first collection of stories published in 2003 by Open City Magazine. That same year he was published in Bomb and Bald Ego. Andoe had earlier authored a comic-book-sized group of stories about his life that he distributed to friends and family. In 2005, Harper Collins asked him to create a longer, narrative version of that work. These became the inspiration for Jubilee City: A Memoir at Full Speed (P.S.) which was published in 2007.

Amy Finnerty from the New York Times reviewed his memoir, writing, "[the subtitle] suggests that Andoe is eager to depict himself as a raw and reckless sort ... he is ardent but infantile, and his delivery is so deadpan that we’re never sure whether he’s self-critical or clueless."

== Personal life ==
Andoe currently lives in New York City. He has two children, a son (Sam) and a daughter (Lilly).
