= Jubilee City =

Book by Joe Andoe

- Author: Joe Andoe
- Genre: Autobiography
- Publication date: 2007

Jubilee City (2007) is the autobiography of the artist Joe Andoe. In it, Andoe relates his journey from his drug filled youth in Tulsa, Oklahoma to his success as a painter in New York City.

== Plot ==
The book begins in Andoe’s place of birth Tulsa, Oklahoma, the location of a popular department store in the 1960s, Jubilee City, from which the book takes its name. The first third of the memoir describe his childhood and teen years. Andoe attended college majoring in art. It is during this time that he becomes involved in a turbulent relationship, which after marriage becomes rockier still. Soon thereafter the couple moves to New York, where Andoe and his wife have a child. The wife is the primary provider for the family and Andoe assumes the role of a stay-at-home dad, though he does continue to paint. Acclaim for his artwork begins to accumulate, and with success a more stable lifestyle ensues. Soon his wife and him separate, and once again drugs and alcohol become a major part of his life. The book ends on a slightly upward note, as Andoe learns how to better balance his life and ceases to drink.
