= Katherine Porter =

American painter (1940s–2024)

Katherine Porter (1941 or 1944 – April 22, 2024) was an American visual artist. Porter is considered one of the most important contemporary artists associated with Maine. She resisted categorization. Through the medium of painting and drawing her canvases convey the conflict inherent in life. She expressed her ideas with a visual vocabulary that was "geometric and gestural, abstract and figurative, decorative and raw, lyric and muscular."

Porter was shown twice in the Whitney Biennial and had solo exhibitions at the Knoedler Gallery in London, the Nina Nielsen Gallery in Boston, and the Andre Emmerich and Salander-O'Reilly Galleries in New York. Her work was added to the collections of the Metropolitan Museum of Art, Museum of Modern Art, Whitney Museum of American Art, Museum of Fine Arts in Boston, Virginia Museum of Fine Arts, and the Tel Aviv Museum in Jerusalem.

== Early life and education ==
Katherine Louanne Pavlis was born in Cedar Rapids, Iowa, and grew up in rural Iowa. Her birth date has been given variously as September 11, 1944 and 1941. She moved to Colorado in the late 1950s, studying at Colorado College in Colorado Springs, Colorado from 1959–1961. She also studied at Boston University, where her teachers included Conger Metcalf and Walter Tandy Murch. She received her Bachelor of Arts degree in 1963.

While living in Colorado Katherine met Stephen Porter, a sculptor and the child of photographer Eliot Porter and his wife Aline Kilham. Stephen and Katherine were married on January 28, 1962, and divorced in 1967.

As a couple, they traveled to South America, spending time in the Galapagos Islands, Ecuador, Chile, Argentina, and Peru. Katherine Porter's concern for the political and social conflict in South America is shown in many of her works, including Swann's Song (1975).

== Career ==
Porter was active in Boston's artistic community during much of the 1960s. She was part of The Studio Coalition in Boston's South End, combining artistic and political concerns. In 1971, she held her first solo exhibitions, and sold her first work to collector Betty Parsons.

In 1972, Porter moved to New Mexico, where she lived until 1976. During this time, she continued to exhibit in New England, and by 1979, she had returned to Boston. During this period, works such as her Swann's Song (1975) built upon a grid to achieve three-dimensional effects.

She later moved to Maine. By 2017, she was living in Rhinebeck, New York. She is considered one of New England's significant painters.

Katherine Porter received an honorary doctorate from Colby College in 1982 and an honorary doctorate from Bowdoin College in Maine in 1992.

Porter died at her home in Santa Fe, New Mexico on April 22, 2024.

== Style ==
"My paintings are about chaos, constant changes, opposites, clashes, big movements in nature... History, natural things, short wars. I try to put everything into a picture. What you see is what you come up against in the world." – Katherine Porter in an interview with Kay Larson, 1982

"While Elizabeth Murray and Katherine Porter are also involved with formal values in their paintings, these two artists are more openly concerned with an articulation of conflict. Not only is it conflict of a personal, inner nature, but it is also anxiety resulting from the effort to resolve problems raised by the history of abstract painting and their need to establish a place in that history."

== Bibliography ==
- Porter, Katherine; Fine Arts Museums of San Francisco (1980). Katherine Porter: works on paper 1969–1979: an exhibition. San Francisco: Fine Arts Museums of San Francisco. ISBN 9780884010340. OCLC 6922285.
- Porter, Katherine; Rose Art Museum (1985). Katherine Porter: paintings, 1969-1984. Waltham, Mass.: Rose Art Museum, Brandeis University. OCLC 13186606.
- Porter, Katherine; André Emmerich Gallery (1990). Katherine Porter, New Paintings: March 8 to 31, 1990. New York: André Emmerich Gallery. OCLC 222143508
- Porter, Katherine; Gasman, Lydia; Yau, John (2002). Noon Knives. Hard Press Editions.ISBN 9781889097602, 1889097608

== See also ==
- Boston Expressionism
