= Lisa Bradley =

American artist

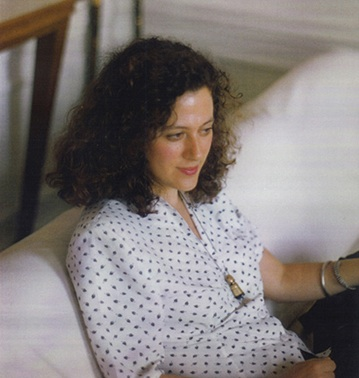
- Born: 1951; Columbus, Ohio
- Education: Boston University
- Known for: Painting, Drawing

Lisa Bradley (born 1951 in Columbus, Ohio) is an American artist who has been exhibiting for over forty years at galleries and museums in New York City, Washington, D.C., Los Angeles, San Francisco, Chicago, Boston, Paris, Helsinki, Tokyo, Brussels, and Dakar.

== Career ==
Her paintings are in the collections of the Minneapolis Institute of Arts, Delaware Art Museum, Columbus Museum of Art, National Museum of Women in the Arts, Pennsylvania Academy of the Fine Arts, Farnsworth Art Museum, Frederick R. Weisman Art Museum, and New Orleans Museum of Art.

Her works have been reviewed by critics in art publications including Artforum, D’Art International, Arts Magazine and the Helsingin Sanomat.

The American artist and art dealer Betty Parsons was a mentor in Bradley's early career. The collectors The late Herbert Vogel and Dorothy Vogel have been mentors of her work, and Bradley’s paintings and drawings from the Vogel collection are currently being exhibited in museums in the United States as part of the Vogel 50/50 collaboration sponsored by the National Gallery of Art.

Currently living and working in New York, where she has been based since the late 1970s, Bradley is known for the dynamic interaction of line, plane, and space in her paintings. Having developed an individualized formal vocabulary, the artist achieves an expression of simultaneous movement and stillness. Her painting creates a feeling of suspended time or, as an art critic, Carter Ratcliff commented, "a pause between the pulses of some vast and luminous energy." A reproduction of her work appears in the seminal art history text, The Art of Seeing, 3rd through 6th editions, published by Prentice Hall.
