= William L. Haney =

American painter

- Born: June 17, 1939; Strong City, Kansas
- Died: March 22, 1992 (aged 52); Louisville, Kentucky
- Notable work: “Marry Off”,“Shut Off”
- Movement: Realism

William L. Haney (June 17, 1938, in Strong City, Kansas – March 22, 1992) is recognized for his narrative-realist paintings. His paintings were constructed as conceptual collages involving social-political issues of the late 20th century. Haney was intensely engaged in art history, often referencing other artists and the world around him. His artistic process consisted of drawing and collecting images from magazines, posters, and other sources. Usually, he would prepare watercolor first and then plan placement as per color attributes, finishing with an oil painting and print. His draftsman skills only allowed him to draw on canvas without the aid of a camera. He was also known as a super-realist and a post photo-realist. Other contemporary painters working in a super-realistic or hyper-realistic style are Richard Estes and Robert Birmelin.

== Life ==
At an early age, Haney’s family moved to Topeka, Kansas, where he spent his childhood and grew up. He received his B.F.A. from Washburn University and M.F.A. from Indiana University in Bloomington. While studying at Indiana, he was strongly influenced by the realist James McGarrell, along with other realists dating back to the Renaissance. He lived in New York City from 1972-1986, where he was employed as faculty at the New York Institute of Technology and Pratt Institute. After leaving New York, he moved to Louisville, Kentucky to become Chairperson of Fine Arts at Bellarmine University. He died at age 53 in Louisville, Kentucky.

== Work ==
Shut Off
- Artist: William L. Haney
- Year: 1987
- Medium: Oil on canvas
- Dimensions: 91 cm × 137 cm (36 in × 54 in)
- Condition: Permanent Collection
- Location: Mulvane Art Museum, Topeka

Marry Off
- Artist: William L. Haney
- Year: 1987
- Medium: Oil on canvas
- Dimensions: 147 cm × 117 cm (58 in × 46 in)
- Condition: Permanent Collection
- Location: Mulvane Art Museum, Topeka

In New York City he was represented by the Sherry French Gallery and James Yu Gallery. His art was purchased by many private collectors such as Malcolm Forbes 2., and museums and galleries such as the Metropolitan Museum of Art. Many of his paintings were sold during his lifetime; however, most of them remained till his death too and were later donated to Mulvane Art Museum in Topeka, Kansas. Reviews of Haney’s work have appeared in the New York Times, Art in America, ARTNews, and Patterns Across Disciplines by Stuart Hirschberg 3. Photographs of his work have appeared in art magazines as well as Science Magazine 4. Selected exhibitions include: Metropolitan Museum of Art in New York City; Solomon R. Guggenheim Museum in New York City; Butler Institute of American Art, Youngstown, OH; Aldrich Museum of Contemporary Art, Ridgefield, CT; and Mulvane Art Museum, Topeka, KS, whose permanent collection includes Marry Off and Shut Off (images are found above).

== Notes ==
1. John Ward, American Realist Painting 1945-1980. Ann Arbor: UNI Research Press, 1989, pp. 342–43.
2. Michael Kernan, The Life in a Day of Malcolm Forbes, The Washington Post, June 5, 1983
3. Alan Wallach, William L. Haney and Jan van Eyck in Patterns Across Disciplines by Stuart Hirschberg. New York: MacMillan Publishing, 1987, pp. 217–20.
4. Invested Interest In in The Sciences, January/February 1987.
