= William Paul Morehouse =

- Born: 1929; San Francisco
- Died: 1993 (aged 63–64)
- Education: California School of Fine Arts; San Francisco State University
- Known for: Painting

William Paul Morehouse (1929–1993) was an American artist.

== Life ==
Morehouse studied at the California School of Fine Arts from 1947 to 1950. After graduating, he served in the Korean War as a Master Sergeant and was awarded with a Purple Heart in 1953. He graduated from San Francisco Art Institute with a BFA in 1954, and from San Francisco State University with an MA in 1956.

Morehouse was part of the Young American Painters exhibition at the Solomon R. Guggenheim Museum, which included other notable artists including Diebenkorn, deKooning, Motherwell, and Jackson Pollock.

His papers are held at the Archives of American Art.
