= Polynesian Fantasy =

Studio album by The Out Islanders (Billy May and Charlie Barnet)
- Released: 1961
- Genre: Exotica
- Label: Capitol

Professional ratings
Review scores
Source	Rating
Billboard	link

Polynesian Fantasy is an album by The Out-Islanders released in 1961. The Out Islanders was a one-time combination of many of music industry's leading side men brought together by Billy May, who arranged and conducted the album, and Charlie Barnet, who played saxophone on the album.

== Overview ==
Billy May got his start as an arranger and trumpeter for Charlie Barnet's big band in the late 1930s. Later, May won a reputation as one of the music industry's top arrangers, working with Frank Sinatra, Nat King Cole, Peggy Lee, Rosemary Clooney and George Shearing on some of the most successful albums of the 1950s.

In 1961, May teamed up with Barnet for an album of Hawaiian music. May recalled that he and Barnet came up with the idea while vacationing together in Hawaii and initially planned to call the band "The Kon-Tikis". When the album was released in 1961, the group was referred to as "The Out-Islanders." For the project, May served as arranger and conductor with Barnet playing saxophone. May and Barnet recruited many of the era's top session players to work with them, including pianist Jimmy Rowles, saxophonist Ted Nash, guitarist Al Hendrickson and drummer Irv Cottler. Marni Nixon and Loulie Jean Norman added wordless vocals on several tracks.

The album's liner notes described the music as "lush, sometimes rhythmically swinging" with "a discretely seasoned exotic flavor", adding up to "a real listening experience in this Polynesian fantasy."

== Critical reception ==
When the album was released in 1961, Billboard gave it a four-star rating. The review noted the album's "lush, Hawaiian stylings with much use of the steel guitar and various percussion instruments of the Islands, set against a substantial woodwind section." The review concluded, "Delightful mood wax with a most displayable cover."

With the revival of interest in ultra lounge and exotica music in the 1990s and 2000s, the music of The Out-Islanders reached a new audience. A digitally remastered version of The Out Islanders' "Moon Mist" was included on Capitol Records' 1996 compilation, "Ultra-Lounge, Vol. 1: Mondo Exotica." "Honorable Hong Kong Rock" was included in Capitol's follow-up disc, "Ultra-Lounge, Vol. 8: Cocktail Capers." And The Out Islanders' rendition of "Ebb Tide" was included on the 2002 compilation, "66 Easy Listening Favorites."

== Track listing ==
The album contained 12 tracks.

1. "My Tane"
2. "Little Island"
3. "The Moon of Manakoora"
4. "China Sea"
5. "Beyond the Reef"
6. "Sand in My Shoes"
7. "Poinciana"
8. "Return to Paradise"
9. "Sea Breeze"
10. "Moon Mist"
11. "Ebb Tide" (Robert Maxwell)
12. "Honorable Hong Kong Rock"

== Personnel ==
- Billy May - arranger and conductor
- Charlie Barnet - saxophone
- Jimmy Rowles - piano
- Ted Nash - saxophone
- Al Hendrickson - guitar
- Irv Cottler - drums
- Marni Nixon - wordless vocals
- Loulie Jean Norman - wordless vocals
