= Gary Bower =

American artist

Gary Bower is an American artist born in Dayton, Ohio, on May 10, 1940. He received his undergraduate and MFA degrees from Ohio State University.

His paintings incorporate a blend of figurative and abstract imagery with an impressive use of color. His work is in the collection of the Whitney Museum of American Art and other public and private collections. He has "held several positions, including serving as the director at the School of the Arts in Lacoste, France; visiting artist positions at the School of the Chicago Art Institute, Bard College, and the University of California, Davis, CA; and Staff Critic in the Independent Study Program at the Whitney Museum of American Art, New York. He has had numerous solo exhibitions at major museums and galleries throughout the United States."

== Bibliography ==
- Bell, Tiffany. After Matisse, Catalogue for exhibit of same title. New York: Independent Curators, Inc. 1986
- Berlind, Robert. Gary Bower at the New Gallery Art In America. May/June 1978
- Gary Bower at Max Protetch. Art In America. January 1981
- Collings, Betty. Moving the Margin, Catalogue for exhibit of same title. Akron, OH: Emily Davis Gallery, University of Akron, 1990
- Gibson, Eric. Points of View, Four Painters, Catalogue for the show of the same title organized by Susan Sollins for Independent Curators, Inc., New York, 1984
- Glueck, Grace. Gary Bower and Joseph Santore, The New York Times. April 27, 1984
- Ratcliff, Carter. Gary Bower. Catalogue, The Madison Art Center, Madison, WI 1974 Gary Bower at the New Gallery. Art in America. May/June 1978
- Rubin, David S. Gary Bower, Idealist in Twentieth Century Painting. Catalogue exhibit Gary Bower, Abstract Paintings, 1968 – '93 Cleveland CCA, Cleveland OH, 1994
- Sundell, Nina. Gary Bower: Abstraction and Image. Catalogue for show of the same name, The New Gallery of Contemporary Art, Cleveland, Ohio. 1982
