= Breakfast with Hunter =

- Directed by: Wayne Ewing
- Produced by: Wayne Ewing
- Starring: Hunter S. Thompson
- Release date: June 21, 2003 (CineVegas)
- Running time: 91 minutes
- Country: United States
- Language: English

Breakfast with Hunter is a 2003 documentary film about the everyday life of gonzo-journalist Hunter S. Thompson by Wayne Ewing.

The film includes a variety of well-known figures involved with Thompson throughout his life, including P. J. O'Rourke, Ralph Steadman, Roxanne Pulitzer, Johnny Depp, Terry Gilliam and Benicio del Toro.

Live stage segments were recorded at The Viper Room in early September 1996.
