= David Sawin =

American painter

David Sawin (April 22, 1922 – June 28, 1992) was an American painter working primarily in New York City during the middle part of the 20th century. His style, though singular, was described by Meyer Schapiro and Arthur Danto as second-generation abstract expressionism.

== Biography ==
Sawin was born in New York City. He attended Brown University, received a B.A. from Columbia University and an M.A. from the University of Iowa. He studied in Paris on the G.I. Bill with Fernand Léger. At Columbia, Sawin studied under Meyer Schapiro, who admired him and collected his work. Their correspondence in the archives at Columbia University indicates a lifelong friendship. He was also deeply admired by the philosopher and critic Arthur Danto

Sawin taught at Brooklyn College from 1959-1984 in an art department that included Philip Pearlstein, Walter Rosenblum, Lois Dodd, and Lennart Anderson. He also taught at Sarah Lawrence College, Williams College, and Columbia University.

From 1949 to 1969 he was married to the art historian and writer Martica Sawin.

His work is held in numerous private collections. It was included in the 1955 Annual Exhibit of Contemporary Painting at the Whitney Museum of American Art and in “New York School – Second Generation” at the Jewish Museum in 1957. A 1986 exhibit at the Waverly gallery was the subject an article in The Nation by Arthur Danto and he was the subject of a retrospective at the Newport Art Museum in 1988, with a catalogue essay by Arthur Danto.

== Work ==
Meyer Schapiro and Arthur Danto held the view that Sawin’s paintings both share a certain spirit with the abstract expressionist movement yet decidedly defy that categorization.
