= Michael Lucero (sculptor) =

American ceramics artist and sculptor (born 1953)

Michael Lucero (born 1953) is an American ceramics artist and sculptor. Lucero works with multiple mediums and usually works in series.

Lucero was born in 1953 in Tracy, California and attended Humboldt State University, where he graduated with a Bachelor of Arts in 1975. He later attended the University of Washington in Seattle, where he earned a Master of Fine Arts.

Lucero now resides in Tennessee. His new series explore the abstract form of smaller figures glazed in his signature bright colors and eye-catching drawings.

Lucero's work is included in the permanent collections of the American Craft Museum, NY; the Carnegie Museum of Art, Pittsburgh, PA; and the Mint Museum, Charlotte, NC.
