= Organic Abstraction =

Organic Abstraction is an artistic style characterized by "the use of rounded or wavy abstract forms based on what one finds in nature." It takes its cues from rhythmic forms found in nature, both small scale, as in the structures of small-growth leaves and stems, and grand, as in the shapes of the universe that are revealed by astronomy and physics. Nautillus shells and honeycombs are examples of organic structures that have served as inspiration for this work, along with the bones and musculature of the body, both human and animal.

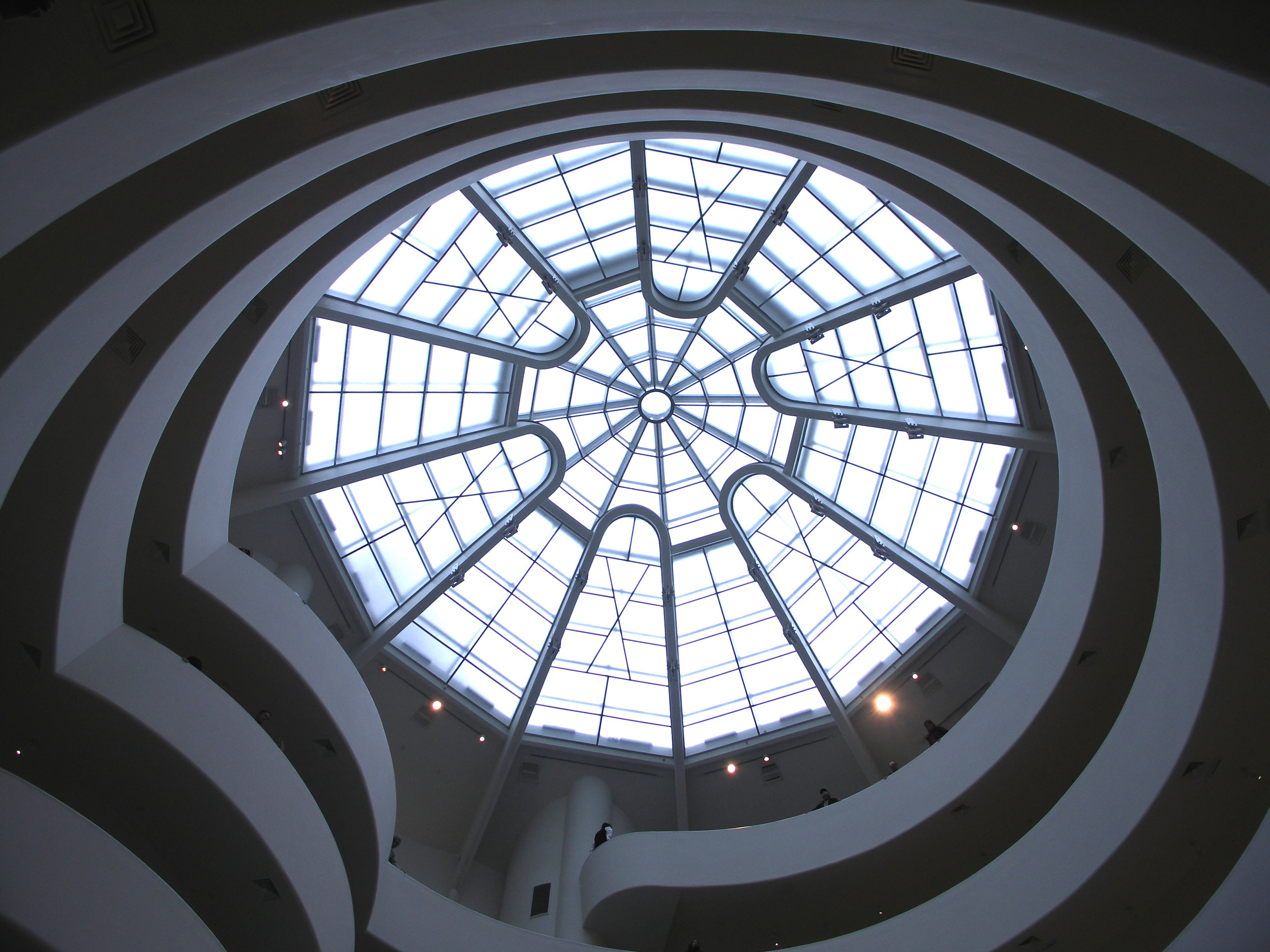
Frank Lloyd Wright, 1959, Solomon R. Guggenheim Art Museum, New York City. The "Chambered Nautilus on 5th Avenue"

Although organic abstraction has been described as a "feature" rather than "an actual movement," the style arose in part as a reaction against the austerity of mid-century Constructivist art and is best known for its practitioners of the mid 20th century, whether in sculpture—Jean Arp, Constantin Brâncuși, Henry Moore; architecture—Eero Saarinen, Frank Lloyd Wright (for the Guggenheim Museum); or design—Charles Eames, Isamu Noguchi. Some recent critics contend that the term Biomorphic Abstraction is coming to be used more generally to describe contemporary art produced in this mode.

== Origins ==
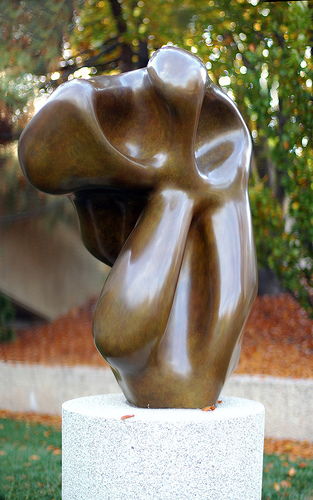
Hans (Jean) Arp, Evocation of a Form: Human, Lunar, Spectral, 1950 Hirshhorn Museum Washington, DC

In the early decades of the 20th century, prevailing attitudes among European intellectual classes favored reason and science. This attitude demonstrated itself in the highly intellectual avant-garde artistic styles that dominated in Europe and America in the 1920s and 30s: an "intentional formalism" prevailed in the precise, geometric tendencies of styles like Cubism, Constructivism and, later, Concrete Art.

A countervailing view was proposed by French Philosopher Henri Bergson in the early 1900s. Bergeson challenged the primacy of representation over abstraction, science and logic over intuition. He proposed a values system elevating creativity that mimicked the processes of nature, whether by fecundity, mutation, or a concept he called "unforeseeable novelty".

Bergson's ideas took some decades before becoming widely influential in the field of the visual arts. "Although biomorphic forms had appeared in both painting and sculpture by 1913, it was only after the destruction of the utopian visions of Futurism, Cubism and Constructivism, by Stalinism, the Great Depression and Nazism, that Science was superseded by Nature as the prime inspiration for painters and sculptors alike. Organic Abstraction aimed not to build or construct rationally, but to emulate the germinal forces of nature."

Bergson's ideas deeply influenced sculptors like Jean Arp and Constantin Brâncuși (both domiciled in France during the 1930s) and, in art, architecture, and design, spread to widespread influence in the 1950s and 60s.

== Influence on Mid-century Modern ==
=== Sculpture ===
- Jean Arp (1886 – 1966)
- Constantin Brâncuși (1876 – 1967)
- Barbara Hepworth (1903 – 1975), Corinthos
- Henry Moore (1898 – 1996) Reclining Figure

=== Design ===
- Isamu Noguchi (1898 – 1996), Noguchi table
- Charles Eames (1898 – 1996), Eames Lounge Chair Wood
- Eero Saarinen (1898 – 1996), Tulip chair.
- Achille Castiglioni (1898 – 1996), Mezzadro Stool

=== Architecture ===
- Eero Saarinen
- Frank Lloyd Wright

== Ongoing Influence ==
=== Architecture ===
- Frank Gehry

== Gallery ==
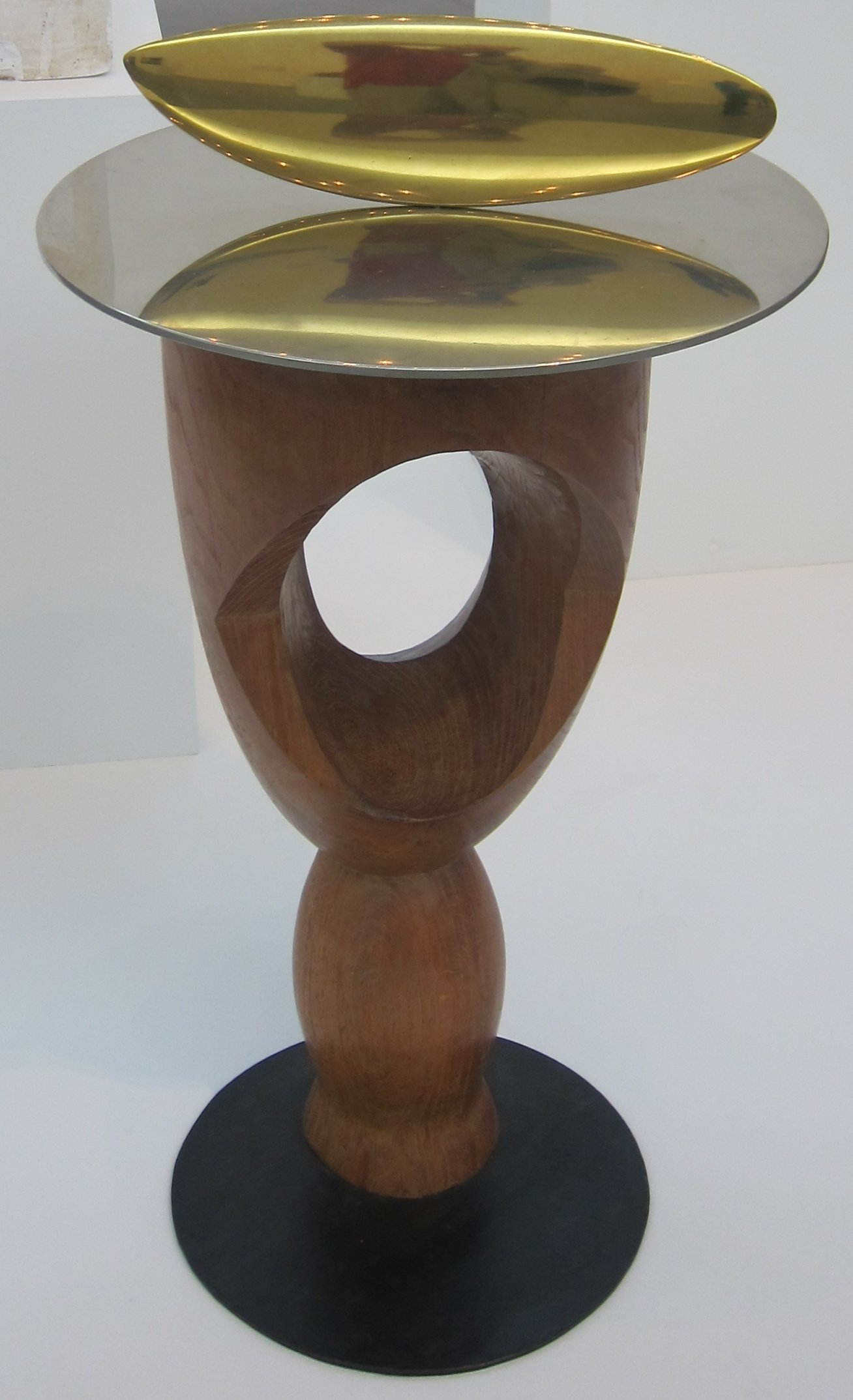
Constantin Brâncusi, 1926, Fish, Bronze, metal and wood, 93.4 × 50.2 × 50.2 cm Tate_Modern, London

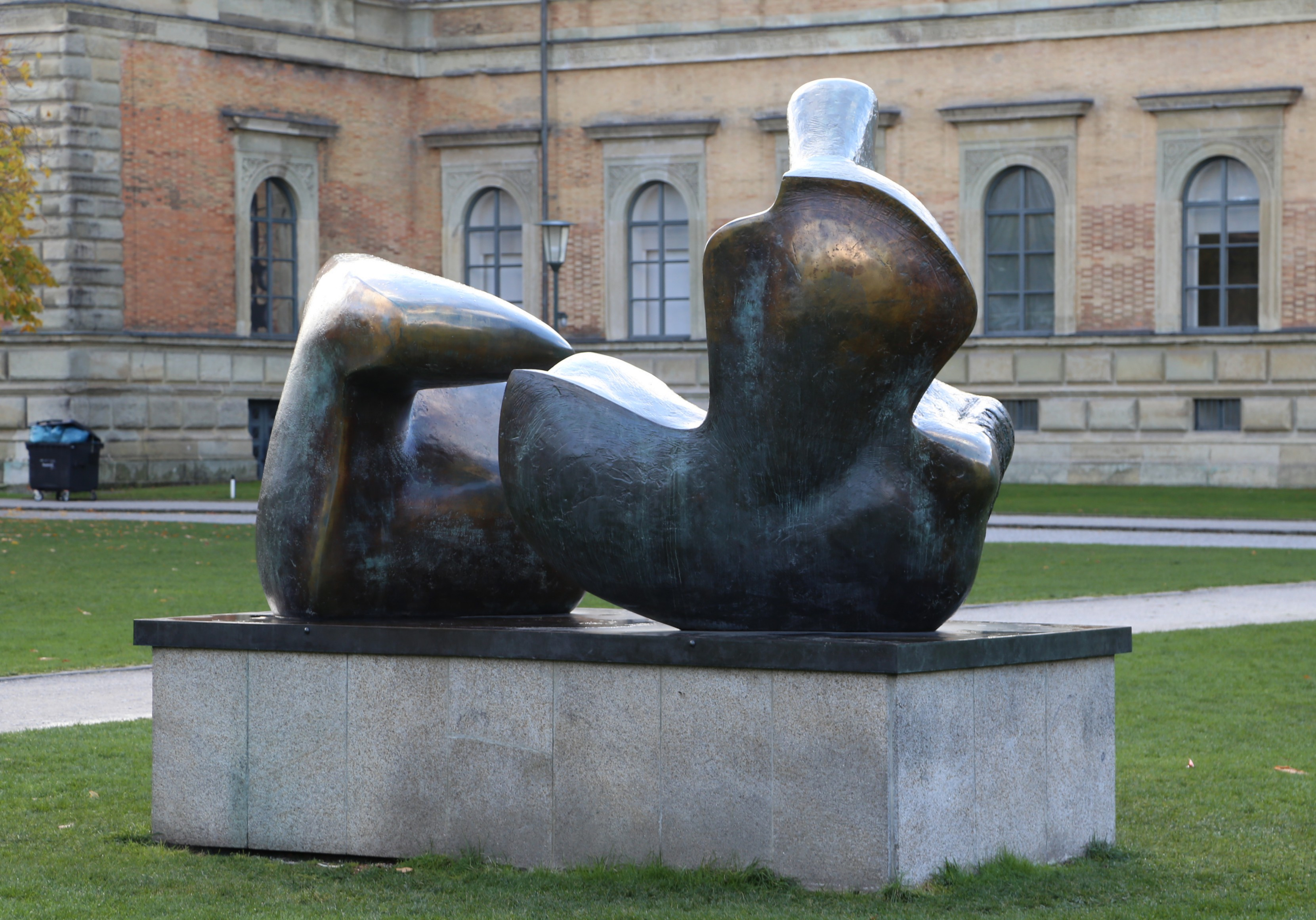
Henry Moore, 1969-70, Two-Piece Reclining Figure: Points, Bronze, Alte Pinakothek, Munich

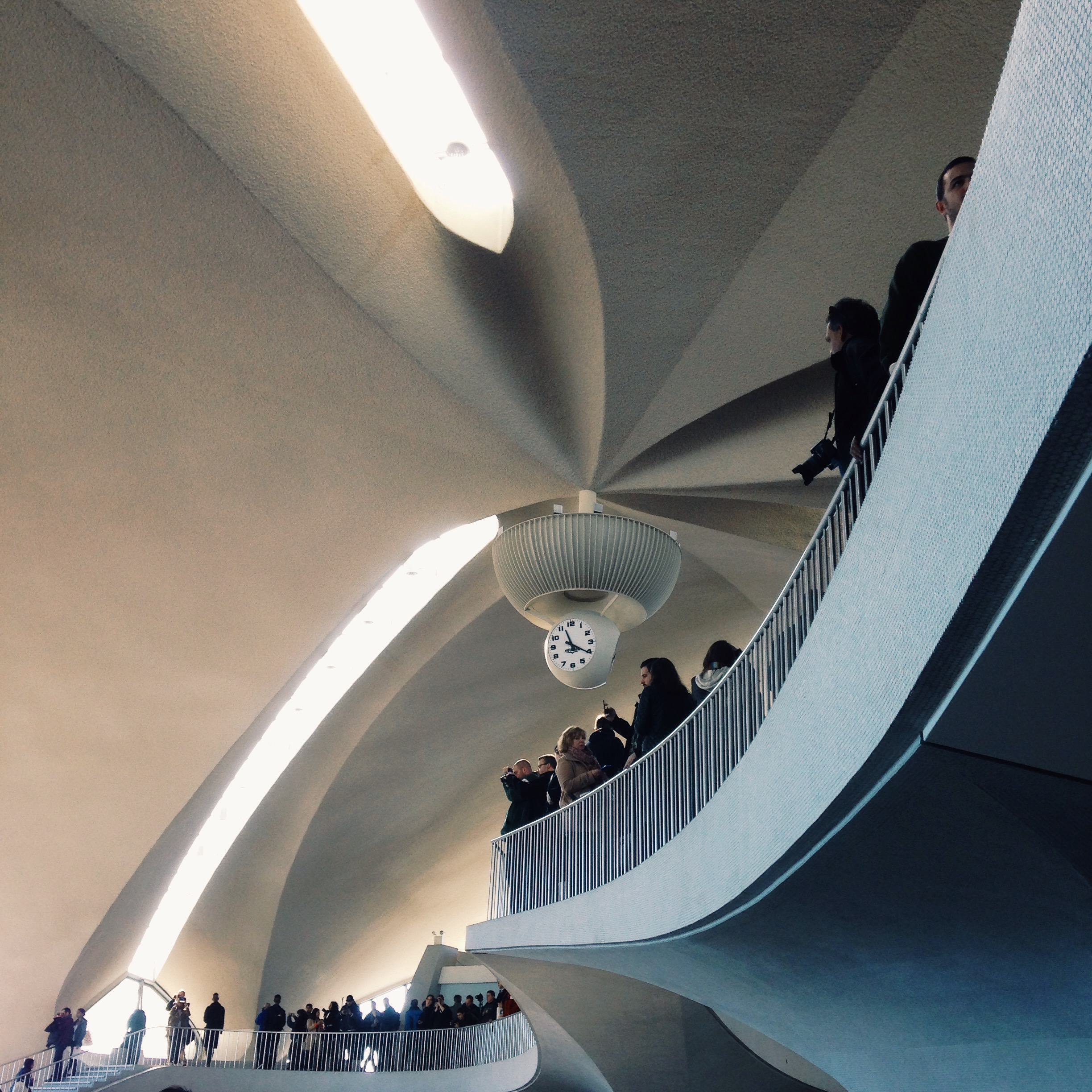
Eero Saarinen, 1956-62, TWA Building, JFK Airport.

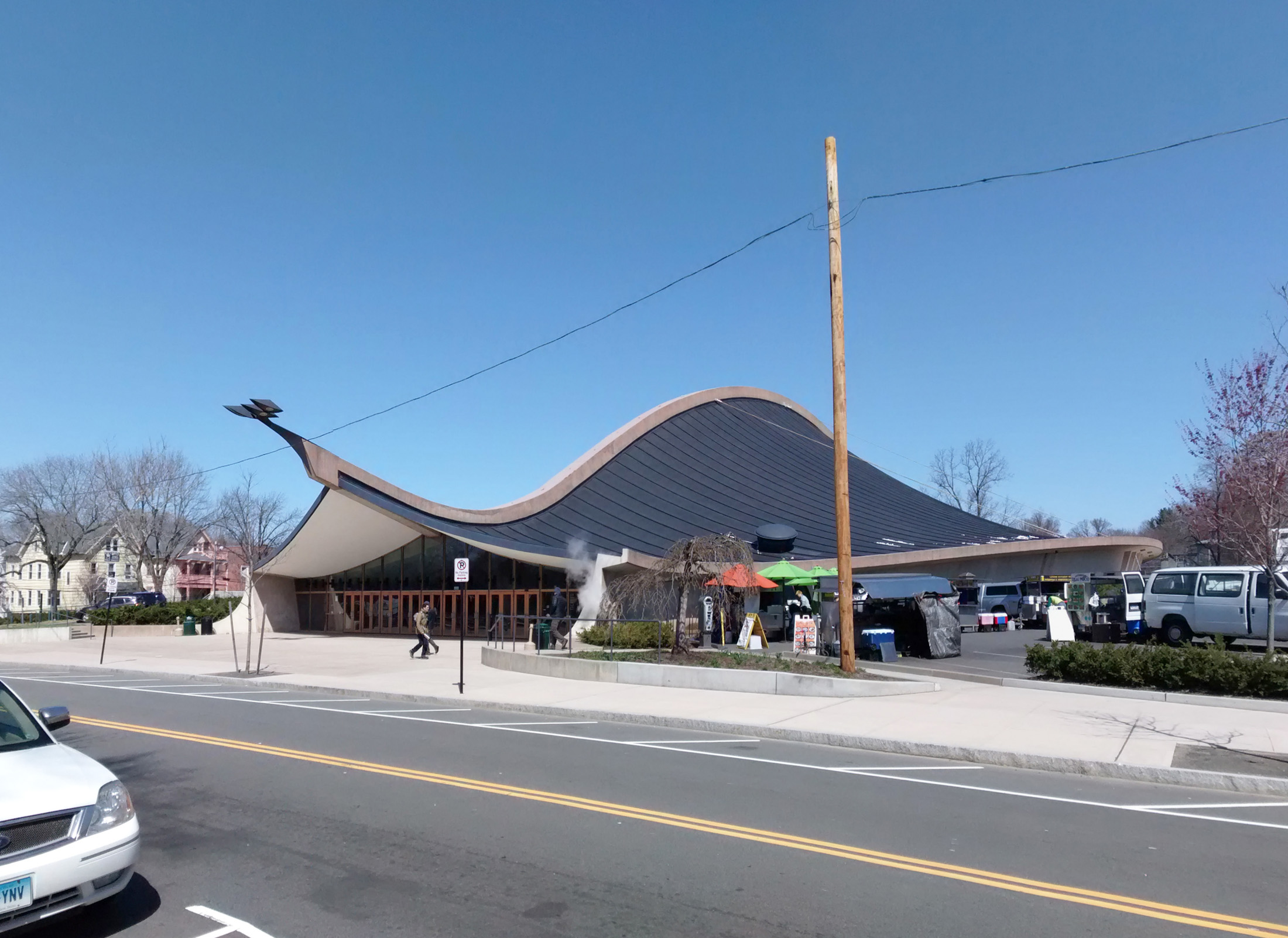
Eero Saarinen, 1953-58, David S. Ingalls Hockey Rink, Yale University, New Haven, CT

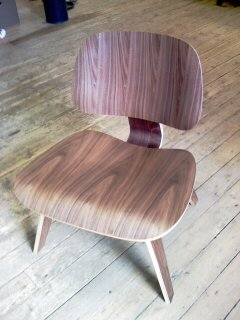
Charles Eames, 1945-6, Lounge Chair Wood, plywood with rosewood veneer, 67.63 x 56.2 x 62.87 cm

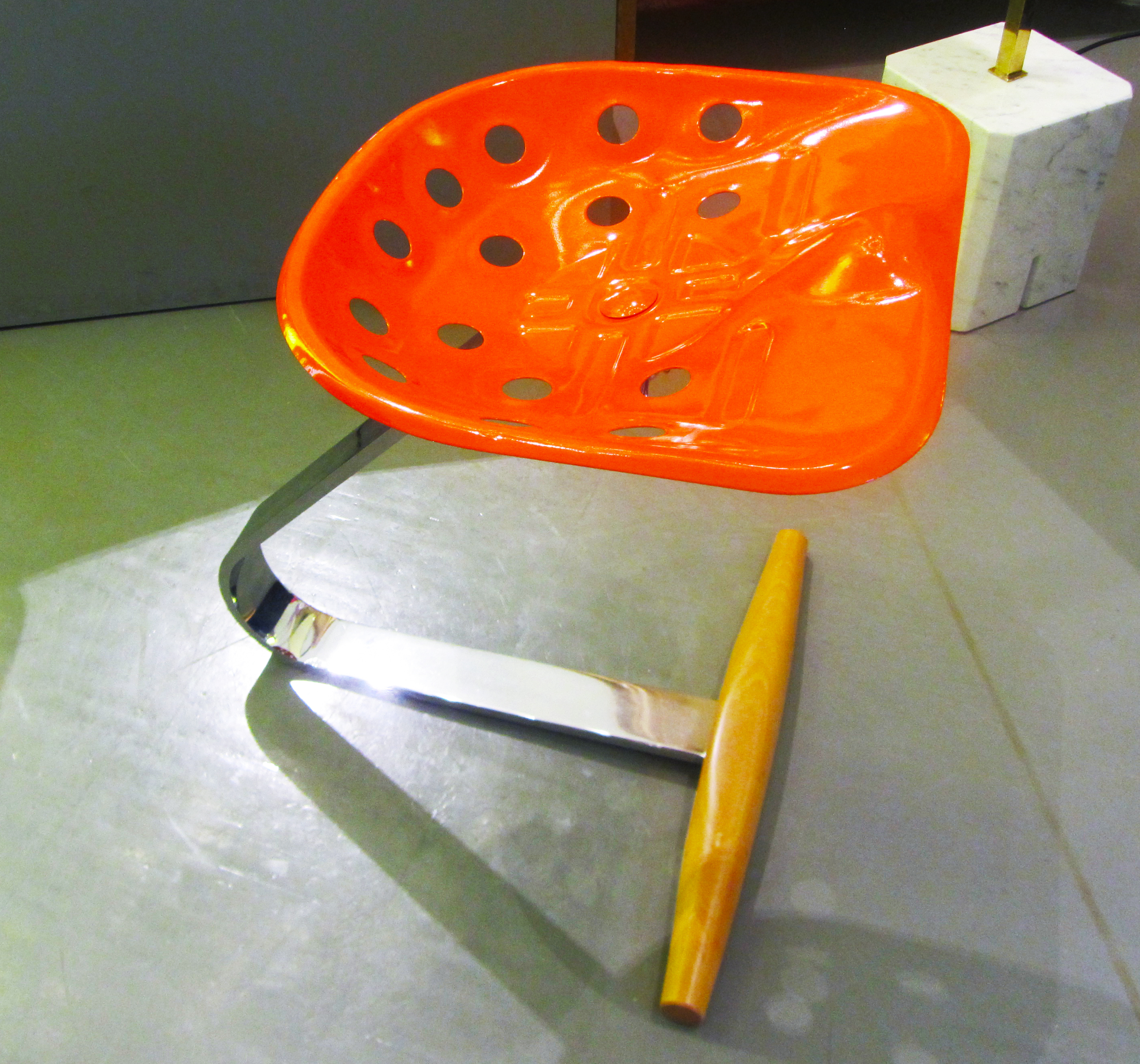
Achille Castiglioni, 1957, Mezzadro Stool, enameled steel, chrome-plated steel, beech, 53 × 49.5 × 53 cm

== See also ==
Biomorphism
