= Lawrence Salander =

American art dealer and fraudster

Lawrence B. "Larry" Salander (born 1949) is a former New York City art dealer and artist. His company, the Salander-O'Reilly Galleries, was cited by the Robb Report in 2003 as the best gallery in the world. By late 2007, Salander had been sued by numerous customers and business partners who claimed that Salander and his company had defrauded them.

== Life and career ==
In November 2007, Salander filed for personal bankruptcy, listing John McEnroe among his creditors. At the time, several artists represented by Salander-O'Reilly also claimed to be owed money. As a result of his bankruptcy, Salander and his wife were ordered to relinquish control of their finances to a trustee.

In March 2009, Salander was charged with 13 counts of first-degree grand larceny, 10 counts of second-degree grand larceny, and other charges. After posting bail of one million dollars, Salander worked in the Phoenix Art LLC Gallery in Millbrook, New York. The Phoenix Gallery exhibited works of the Hudson River Valley, including canvases by well known artist Ralph Della-Volpe, photographer Annemiek do Gersten, and acclaimed Cuban Outsider artist Corso de Palenzuela.

In March 2010 Salander pleaded guilty to 29 felony counts of grand larceny and was sentenced to six to eighteen years in prison. He admitted to selling dozens of pieces that he was supposed to hold without permission. In addition the New York Times reported that Salander had recently been hospitalized with a stroke.

In August 2010, Salander was sentenced to 6 to 18 years in prison for his crimes and was scheduled to serve his time at Midstate Correctional Facility, north of Utica, New York.

According to the website of the New York State Deptartment of Corrections and Community Supervision, his March 2015 parole hearing was denied. As of 11 February 2024 he is no longer listed in the New York prison system's records as incarcerated.

While in custody Lawrence B. Salander wrote Art as I See It published by Austin Macauley in 2019 and a book of one hundred poems titled From Inside The Beast written while still serving time in the New York State Department of Corrections.
