= Bill Jensen =

American painter

- Born: 1945 (age 80–81); Minneapolis, Minnesota
- Education: 1970 M.F.A.University of Minnesota. 1968 B.F.A.University of Minnesota.
- Known for: Painting, Drawing, Printmaking

Bill Jensen (born 1945) is an American abstract painter.

== Education ==
Jensen was born in 1945 in Minneapolis, Minnesota. He studied at University of Minnesota, where he earned his BFA in 1968 and his MFA in 1970. He has lived and worked in New York City since the early 1970s. Jensen was one of the artist pioneers who established a studio in Williamsburg, Brooklyn.

== Career ==
=== Early years ===
In 1971, Jensen was included in a group show at the Brooklyn Museum in New York. His first solo exhibition was at Fischbach Gallery in New York in 1973.

Bill Jensen, "The Five, The Seven (The Scream)" 2002-2006. Oil on linen. 48"x32".

=== Mature work ===
Jensen’s abstract works have been praised for their unconventional compositions and profound sense of color. In 1986, Jensen was included in a group show at Whitney Museum of American Art in New York. In the same year, he had a solo exhibition at the Museum of Modern Art in New York. Jensen explores certain realms of the inner life through abstraction. His works create an invented world which pulses with feelings that relate to real life without depicting it. Jensen had one-person exhibitions at Mary Boone Gallery in 1993, 1995, 1998, 2001, and 2002. Jensen is represented by Cheim & Read Gallery in New York. Jensen described, “…What abstract art can do is put people in touch with areas of their psyche they’re not normally aware of. […] This other world is where prejudice and wars do not exist. The I, the Me, the you, do not exist there. If you can bring people in touch with that for just a second, then you have a different way of looking at the world.”

== Collections ==
Jensen’s work is held in public collections including the Art Institute of Chicago, the Dallas Museum of Art, the Graphische Sammlung Albertina (Vienna), Harvard University Art Museums (Cambridge), the Hirshhorn Museum and Sculpture Garden (Washington), the Honolulu Museum of Art, the Los Angeles County Museum of Art, the Metropolitan Museum of Art, MoCA (Los Angeles), the Museum of Fine Arts, Boston, the Museum of Modern Art (New York), the Phillips Collection (Washington), Stanford University, the Tate Gallery (London), the Walker Art Center, and the Whitney Museum of American Art (New York)
