= Purchase College =

Public college in Purchase, New York, US

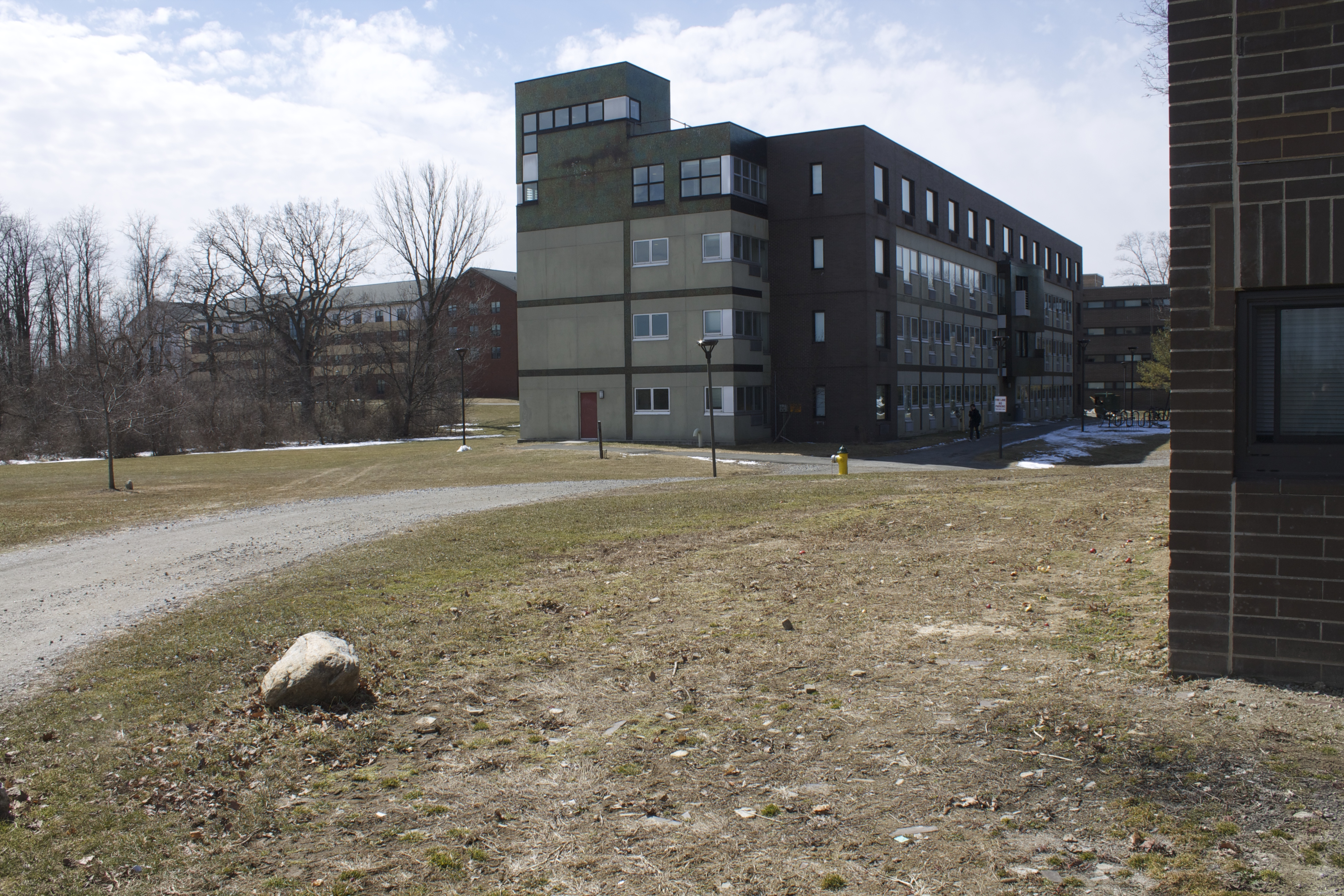
- A side view of the Outback and Fort Awesome Residence Halls (far left)
- Motto: Think Wide Open
- Type: Public liberal arts college
- Established: 1967; 59 years ago
- Parent institution: State University of New York
- President: Michael Steiper
- Provost: Earnest Lamb
- Students: 3,410 (fall 2025)
- Undergraduates: 3,314 (fall 2025)
- Postgraduates: 96 (fall 2025)
- Location: Purchase, New York, United States; 41.047°N 73.702°W
- Campus: Suburban 500 acres (2.0 km^{2})
- Colors: Traditional: Heliotrope; Puce; Athletic: Blue; Orange
- Nickname: Panthers
- Sporting affiliations: NCAA Division III – Skyline Conference
- Mascot: Perseus
- Website: purchase.edu

Purchase College, officially the State University of New York College at Purchase and also commonly referred to as SUNY Purchase, is a public liberal arts college in Purchase, New York. Established in 1967 by Governor Nelson Rockefeller, Purchase College is one of 13 comprehensive colleges in the State University of New York (SUNY) system.

== History ==
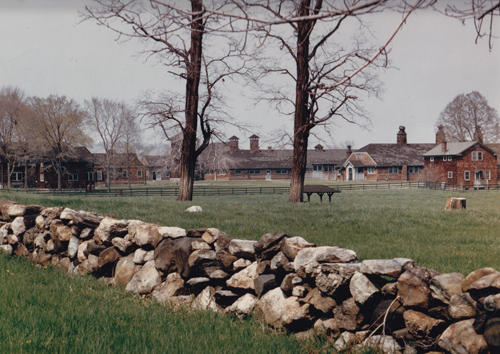
Purchase College was originally a 500-acre estate and working farm in the 18th century

The land that would become Purchase College was first settled by the Thomas family in 1734. John Thomas served as an assemblyman in colonial New York from 1743 to 1776. He served as a judge for the Court of Common Pleas in Westchester and a Muster-Master. Judge Thomas was an early supporter of American independence. Robert Bolton wrote in History of Westchester County that Thomas was "a warm Whig" who gave the first public reading of the Declaration of Independence in New York at the White Plains courthouse on July 11, 1776. On March 22, 1777, Thomas was imprisoned by the British and died on May 2, 1777.

John Thomas' sons, John Thomas, Jr. and Thomas Thomas, also fought for American independence. Thomas Thomas was later appointed a General. He is buried at the Thomas family graveyard, which is located behind the Neuberger Museum of Art on the campus of Purchase College. A tall, white stone obelisk commemorates General Thomas and his family.

In 2019, Thomas J. Schwarz announced that he was stepping down from his role as president after 18 years of service. State University of New York Board of Trustees has appointed Dennis Craig as interim president of Purchase College effective on August 1, 2019. Milagros Peña was named the next President of Purchase College in May 2020, the first Latina woman to be named president of a SUNY college.

On May 2, 2024, as a part of the global network of Gaza war protests at universities, students organized an encampment which was broken up by members of the Westchester County Police Department, causing the arrests of around 70 students and faculty. This led to the faculty declaring a vote of no-confidence in Peña on May 29, 2024, with 87% of the college's 94 voting faculty demanding her resignation. Despite the vote of no-confidence, Peña continued her role as president, and ultimately announced her resignation in September of 2024, though she remained president until May of 2025. Michael E. Steiper was named as her successor on July 28, 2025.

== Academics ==
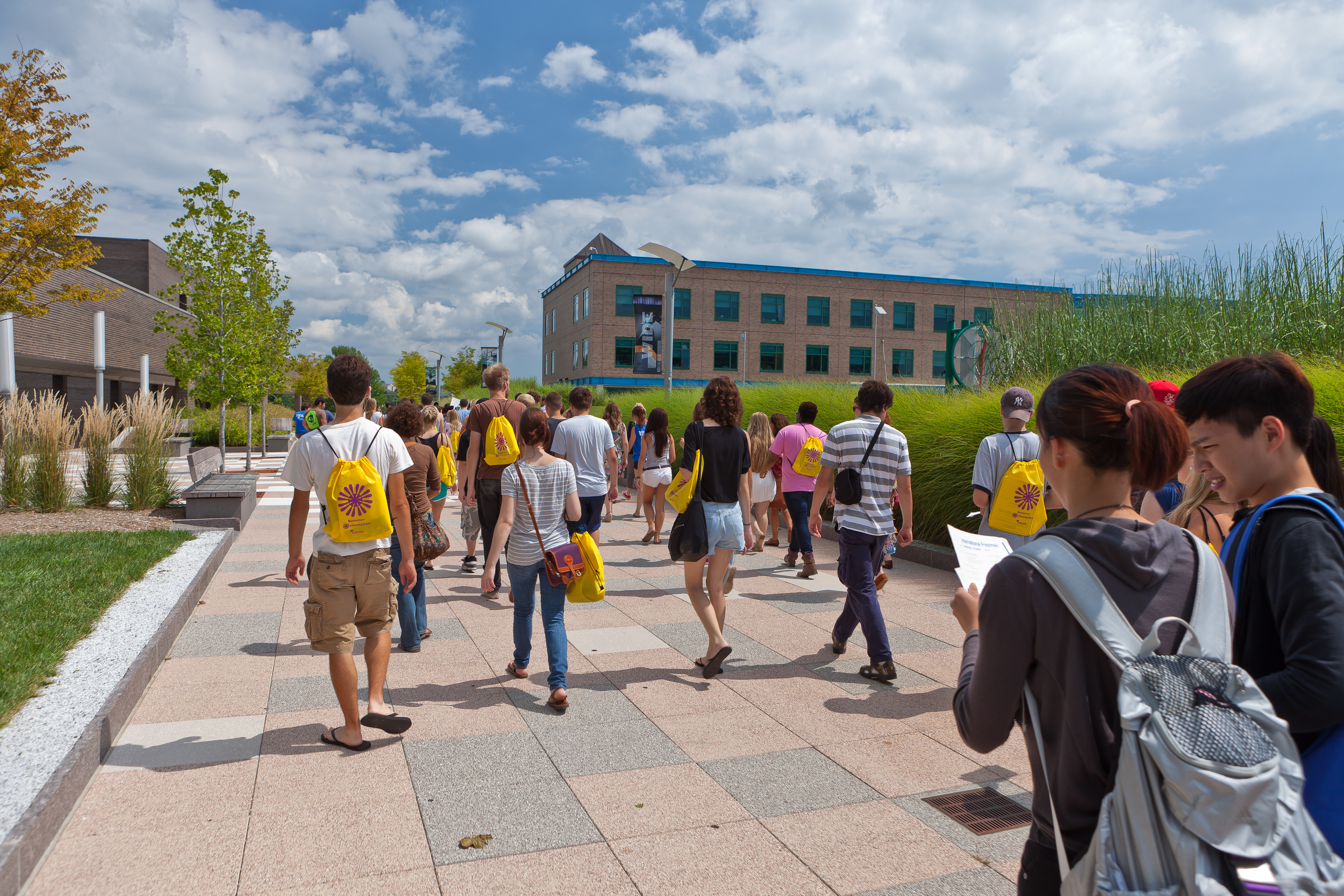
Summer 2013 orientation at the university

As of 2021, Purchase College had 3,695 undergraduate students with freshman enrollment of 647. 59.9% of Purchase's student body is female. 17% of the college's students come from outside of New York state. Purchase has an acceptance rate of 52% and a student-teacher ratio of 12:1. 62% of Purchase students receive need-based financial aid and the college has an endowment of $61.1 million.

Purchase College offers majors from three schools: the School for Liberal Arts and Sciences, the School of the Arts, and the School of Liberal Studies & Continuing Education. According to U.S. News & World Report, the five most popular majors for 2016 graduates at Purchase College were Visual and Performing Arts (48%); General Studies and Humanities (16%); Social Sciences (8%); Psychology (6%); and Communication, Journalism and related programs (5%).

Academic rankings

Liberal arts
- U.S. News & World Report: 155
- Washington Monthly: 99

National
- WSJ/College Pulse: > 600

== School of the Arts ==
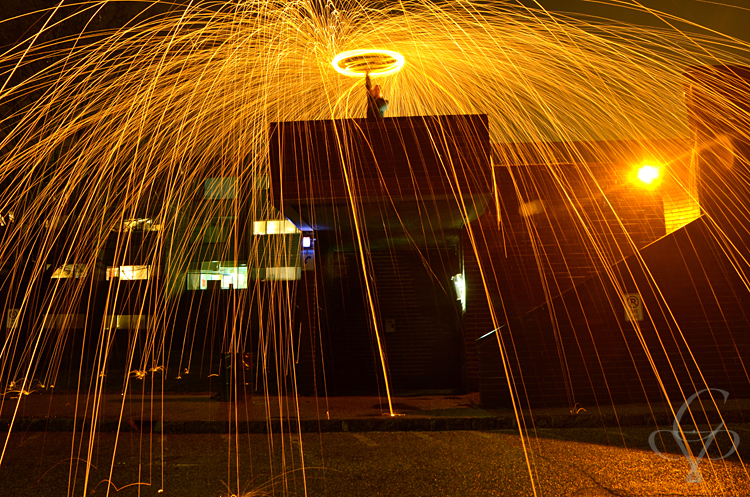
Public art on campus

Purchase College's School of the Arts houses the college's schools of Art+Design and Art Management. It also oversees Purchase's conservatories of Dance, Music and Theatre Arts. Most courses offered by BA programs housed in the School of the Arts are open to all Purchase students. Many BFA and MusB classes are open to all students as well. Approximately 40% of Purchase College's student body is enrolled in the School of the Arts.

The Jandon Business of the Arts Distinguished Lecture Series, endowed by the Donald Cecil family, is designed to enhance the arts management program at the college. Past lecturers include Joseph Volpe, former general manager of the Metropolitan Opera, and Ben Cameron, program director at the Doris Duke Charitable Foundation.

=== School of Art+Design ===
Purchase College's School of Art+Design houses the college's programs in graphic design, painting/drawing, photography, printmaking, and sculpture. It also houses the Richard and Dolly Maas Gallery, which exhibits work from emerging artists, students, faculty, and alumni. The School of Art+Design hosts an annual Visiting Artist Lecture Series that brings artists, art historians, curators, and critics to campus for lectures and discussions with students and the broader Purchase community. Previous guest lecturers include Jules de Balincourt, Justine Kurland, Amanda Ross-Ho, and Barnaby Furnas.

=== Conservatory of Dance ===
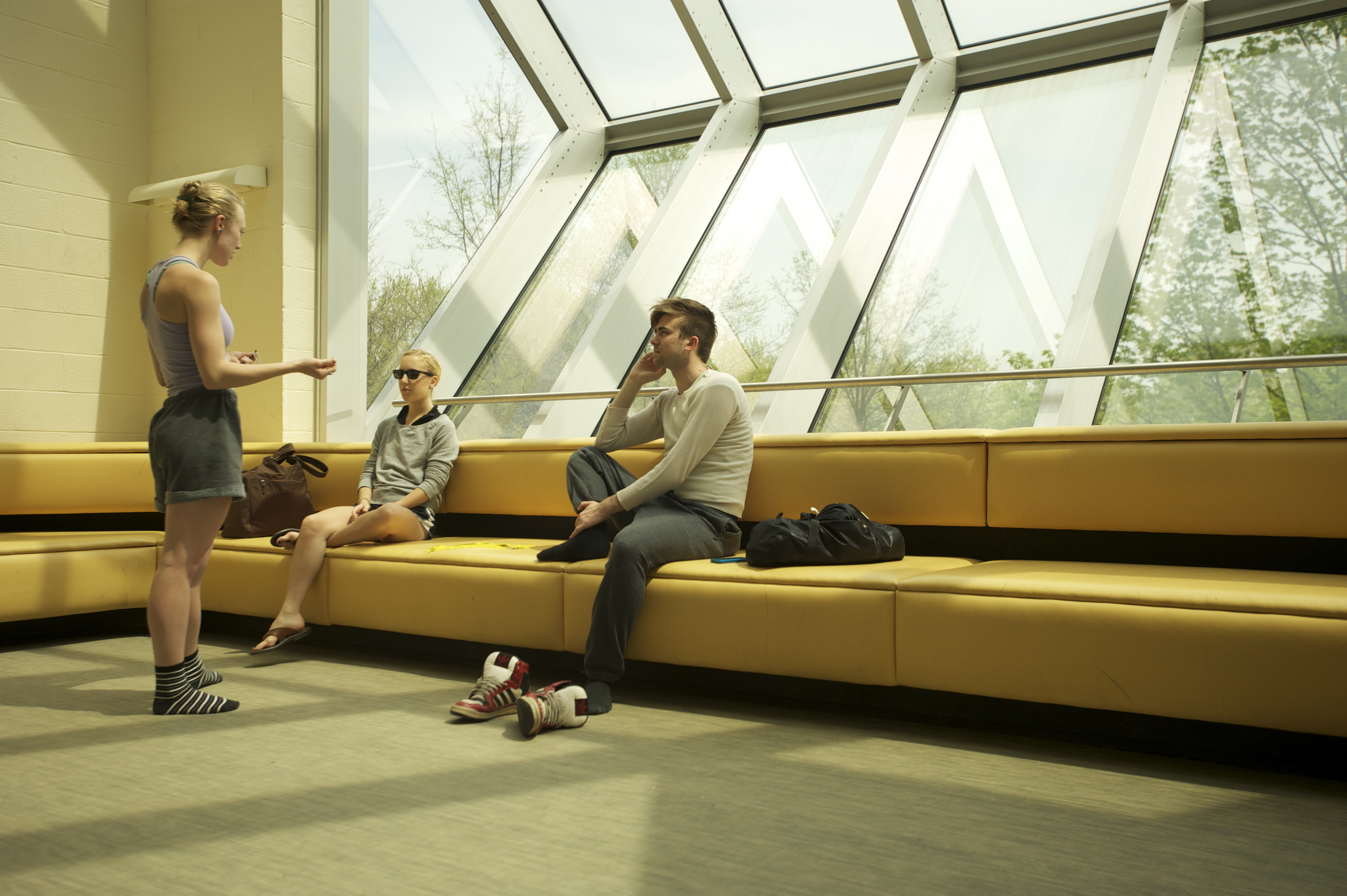
Inside the dance building

The Conservatory of Dance houses both bachelor's and master's programs. It is one of the most highly regarded conservatories of dance in the United States. Undergraduates may major in modern or performance ballet, and dance composition and dance production. The conservatory confers master's degrees in dance choreography and performance teaching. The Conservatory of Dance is housed in the Purchase College Dance Building, which was the first facility constructed in the United States solely for the study and performance of dance.

It is also home to the Purchase Dance Company, the college's student dance company. The Purchase Dance company presents The Nutcracker every December and a balanced repertory during the spring semester. The dance company also tours throughout the United States and internationally during the college's summer break. Purchase College students must audition for inclusion in the dance company, and the cast for individual shows is based on the technical competencies of members of the company. Students may earn college credit for their participation in the company.

=== Conservatory of Music ===
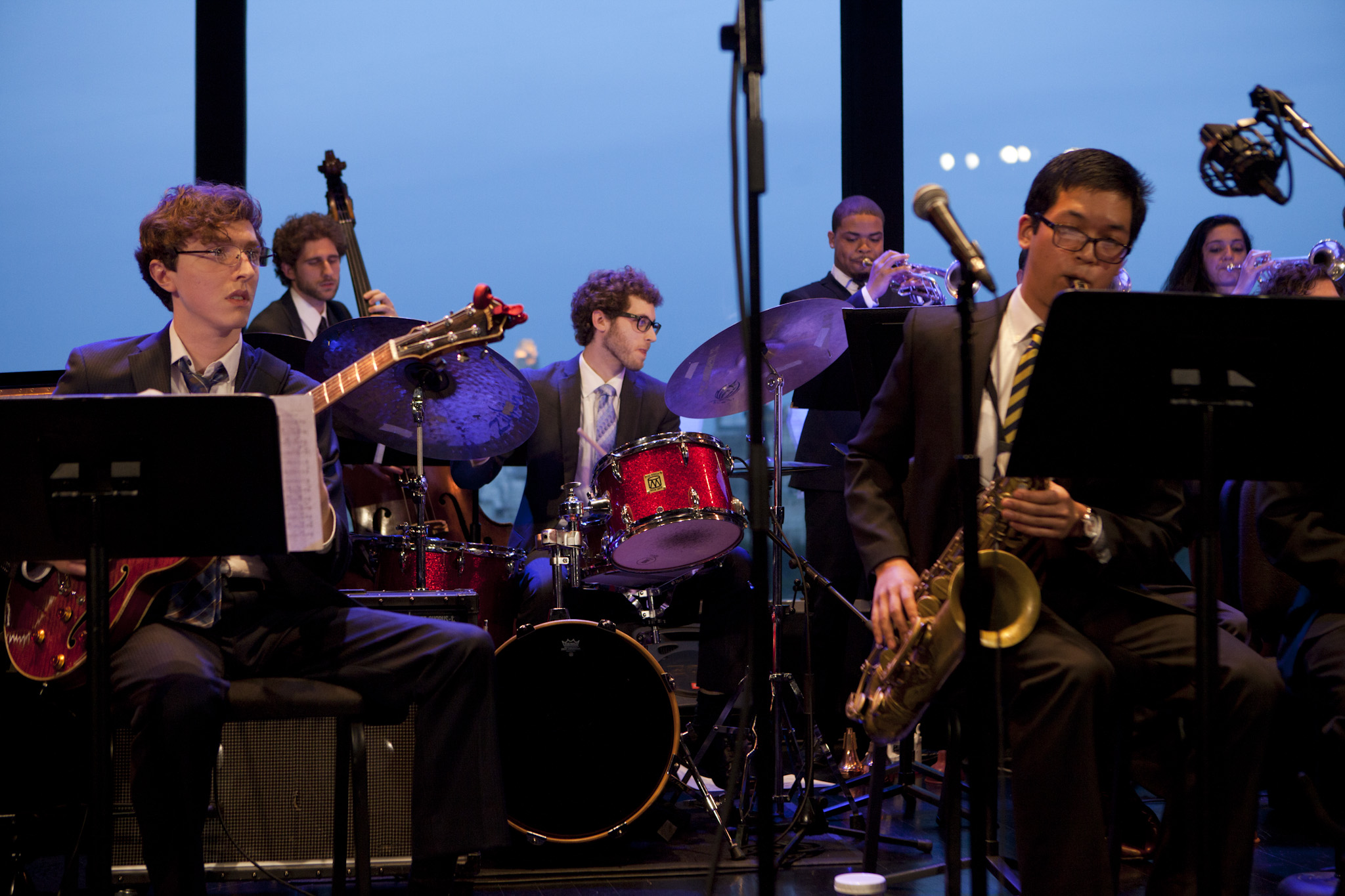
Purchase Jazz Orchestra performs at the Lincoln Center in New York City

Purchase College's Conservatory of Music houses the college's bachelor's and master's programs in music. Undergraduates may study classical music instrumentation with a concentration in one of several types of instruments; voice and opera; classical composition; jazz; studio composition; or studio production. The Conservatory of Music also offers master's programs in all of these areas, except studio production. The enrollment in the conservatory is limited to 400 undergraduate and graduate students. It is one of the few conservatories in the United States that produces full opera productions predominately for undergraduates. The conservatory's Music Building has two recital halls, 75 practice rooms, 80 Steinway & Sons pianos, and professional recording studios.

The Purchase Opera, the school's student opera company, was founded in 1998 and has won nine first-place honors from the National Opera Association. During the 2012–13 season, the opera won first place in the National Opera Association's Division II for its production of Die Fledermaus and second place in Division III for its production of Hansel and Gretel.

The Purchase Jazz Orchestra is a 17-piece big band composed of students from the conservatory's jazz studies program. Each year the orchestra performs at jazz venues such as Blue Note Jazz Club and Dizzy's in New York City.

=== Conservatory of Theatre Arts ===
The Conservatory of Theatre Arts confers three undergraduate degrees: acting; theatre design/technology; and theatre and performance. The conservatory is among the top theatre schools in the nation, according to the Princeton Review. It has a total enrollment of around 400 students.

The conservatory's training focuses on the needs and strengths of individual students, instead of a one-size-fits-all training approach. Students participate in showcases and exhibitions in New York City, Los Angeles, and on-campus at the school's blackbox theater. Conservatory students can also work on Purchase Repertory Theatre productions. The theatre's productions are held at the Purchase Arts Center and are student-led shows that feature both acting and design/technology students. The BFA acting program only accepts 18 actors each year. Notable acting faculty include Christopher McCann and Trazana Beverley.

The Broadway Technical Theatre History Project at Purchase College presents the annual "Backstage Legends and Masters Award" to distinguished professionals who represent a variety of Broadway production specialties.

== School of Liberal Arts and Sciences ==
Purchase College's School of Liberal Arts and Sciences houses the college's School of Film and Media Studies; School of Humanities; School of Natural and Social Sciences and interdisciplinary studies. Students can choose from 23 separate majors or they can design an interdisciplinary major from several courses of study.

The annual Durst Lecture Series, supported by an endowment from the Durst family, brings in celebrated writers to the campus. Past lecturers include authors Tim O'Brien, Hettie Jones, Michael Chabon, Claudia Rankine and Manohla Dargis.

=== School of Film and Media Studies ===
The College's School of Film and Media Studies houses undergraduate programs in Cinema Studies; Film; Media Studies; New Media, Playwriting and Screenwriting.

=== School of Humanities ===
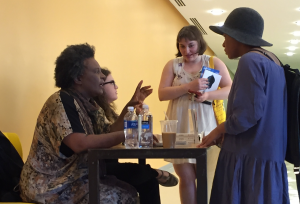
Poet Claudia Rankine, whose work has been featured in Harper's Magazine and The Kenyon Review, speaks to audience member Lena Dunham at the university following a lecture

The School of Humanities houses the college's undergraduate programs in art history; creative writing; history; journalism; language and culture; literature; and philosophy. It also offers a master's in art history.

In addition to its curriculum, the School of Humanities frequently features renowned authors and scholars who provide lectures, known as the Durst Lecture Series. These lectures are supported by the Roy and Shirley Durst Distinguished Chair in Literature. Past lecturers include Rachel Kushner, Claudia Rankine, Michael Chabon, Kirstin Valdez Quade, and Alexander Chee. Lectures are open to the public and provide an open forum for student feedback and interaction.

=== School of Natural and Social Sciences ===
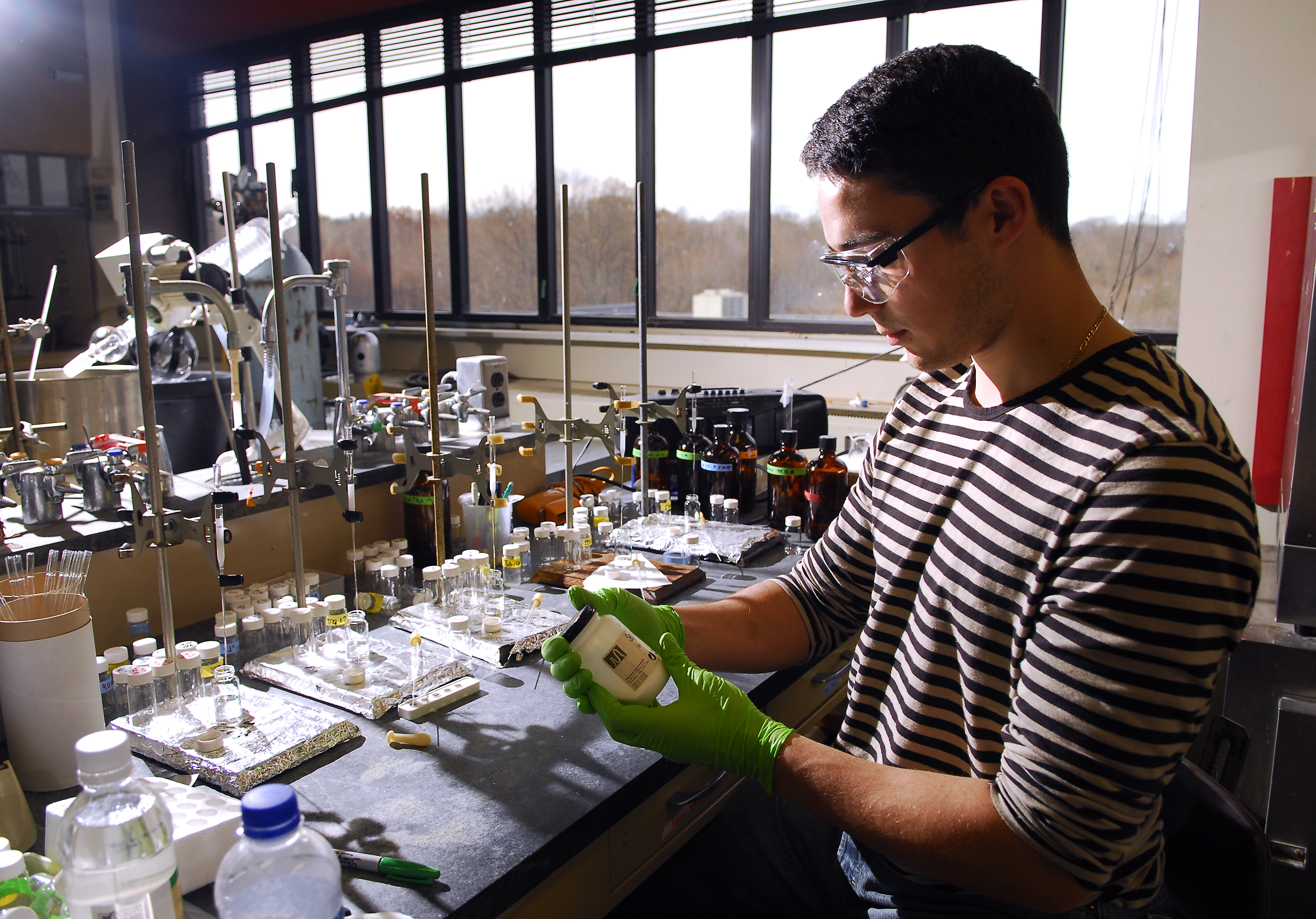
A student in the lab facility of the Natural Sciences Building

Purchase's School of Natural and Social Sciences houses the college's undergraduate programs in anthropology; biochemistry; biology; chemistry; economics; environmental studies; mathematics/computer science; political science; psychology; and sociology. The school also presents an annual Natural and Social Sciences Symposium, which exhibits original research conducted by students; and a lecture series funded by Con Edison.

=== Interdisciplinary Studies ===
The School of Liberal Arts and Sciences offers the Liberal Arts Individualized Program of Study (informally called the Bachelor of Arts in Liberal Arts), which is open to students who want to pursue an individualized course of study that is not accommodated by an existing major. Students work with two faculty members representing their study disciplines to create an individualized curriculum. It also encompasses undergraduate programs in gender studies, Asian studies, and Latin American studies.

== School of Liberal Studies & Continuing Education ==
The School of Liberal Studies & Continuing Education at Purchase College allows community residents and students to complete their bachelor's degree and to take both credit and noncredit courses at the college. The school confers the bachelor's degree in liberal studies, which is designed for students with some undergraduate credit who want complete their degree within a tight time-frame and are looking for a flexible schedule. Up to 90 transfer credits are accepted in this program. It also offers continuing education and certificate programs; an online winter session; and the college's summer session.

=== Noncredit Professional Certificate Programs ===
The School of Liberal Studies & Continuing Education (LSCE) offers noncredit professional certificate courses in appraisal studies (summer only), arts management, drawing and painting, geographic information systems (GIS) (fall and spring only), home staging, interior design (fall and spring only), museum studies (fall and spring only), and social media marketing (fall and spring only). Students may take individual courses without commitment to an entire program, or complete the program requirements and earn a certificate.

The School of Liberal Studies & Continuing Education also partners with specific online providers to increase the flexibility and breadth of certificate offerings. Students can take online courses in nonprofit management, paralegal studies, and receive a CEU certificate upon completion of the health coach training program at the Institute for Integrative Nutrition (IIN).

=== Noncredit Personal Enrichment Courses ===
The School of Liberal Studies & Continuing Education offers noncredit personal enrichment courses that are open to the general public and allow participants to explore personal interests. Students may take courses in woodworking, woodturning, tattoo illustration, photography, creative writing, and filmmaking, with courses in other programs offered throughout the year. The personal enrichment program also offers students who are not enrolled in a degree program at Purchase College the opportunity to take selected undergraduate credit courses on a noncredit basis at a lower noncredit tuition rate. Additionally, students may take individual courses in any of the noncredit professional certificate programs without making a commitment to the entire program.

=== Youth and Precollege Programs ===
For more than 38 years, the School of Liberal Arts & Continuing Education has offered the Summer Youth and Precollege Program in the Arts to provide precollege students a forum to experience enriching learning opportunities. Courses are offered in areas such as songwriting, acting, architecture, visual arts, creative writing, filmmaking, video game and app creation, voice, fashion, musical theatre, and more. Programs are offered in two- and four-week sessions over a six-week period, with full-day and commuter options.

== Rankings and reputation ==
Purchase College was ranked tied as the 136th best national liberal arts college out of 230 in U.S. News & World Report's 2022–2023 college rankings. Kiplinger ranked the school as the 86th "Best Value in Public Colleges" in 2018. Purchase was also listed as one of Princeton Review's top 382 colleges for 2018.

== Student life ==
Undergraduate demographics as of Fall 2023
Race and ethnicity	Total
White	50%
Hispanic	25%
Black	12%
Two or more races	6%
Asian	4%
International student	2%
Unknown	1%
Economic diversity
Low-income (Note: The percentage of students who received an income-based federal Pell grant intended for low-income students.)	36%
Affluent (Note: The percentage of students who are a part of the American middle class at the bare minimum.)	64%

=== Purchase Student Government Association ===
The Purchase Student Government Association (PSGA) is a nonprofit corporation responsible for managing the money collected from Purchase College students' Mandatory Student Activity Fee. The PSGA is divided into three branches: executive, legislative, and judicial. These three branches are subdivided into six bodies: the executive board, the Senate, the Judicial Board, the Council of Clubs & Organizations, the Student Activities Board, and Services Board. In addition to advocating on the student body's behalf, the PSGA runs the college's Student Center, (known to the student body as "The Stood"), and most non-academic activities on campus, including numerous student-run services, and all clubs and organizations.

=== Clubs ===
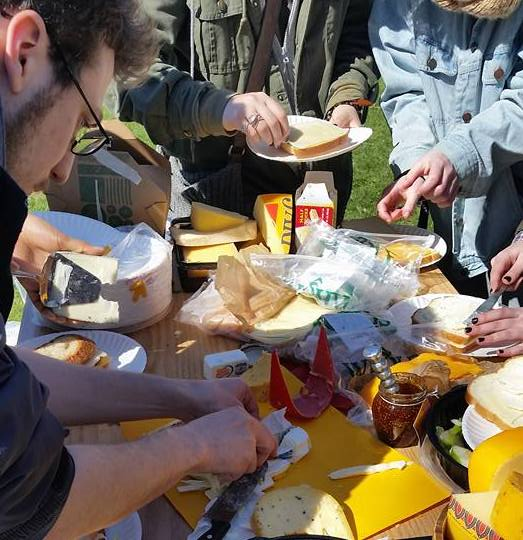
Students gather at a weekly Cheese Club meeting on the Great Lawn at the university

Purchase College hosts a variety of clubs, organizations and services for its students to engage in their hobbies and interests with one another. As of spring 2018, Purchase boasts over 50 of these organizations, reflecting its on-campus diversity.

=== Events ===
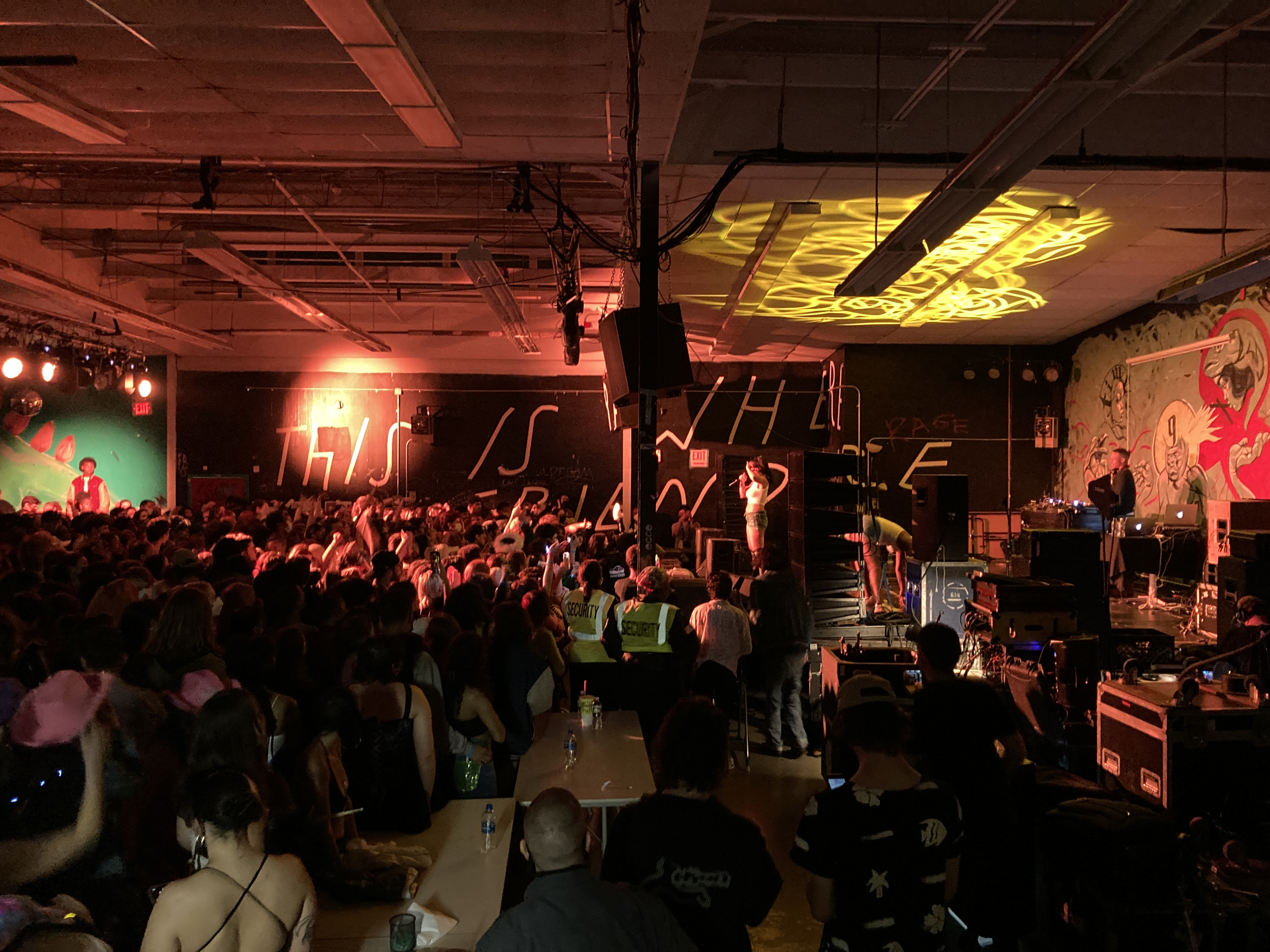
Princess Nokia performs at The Stood in 2022

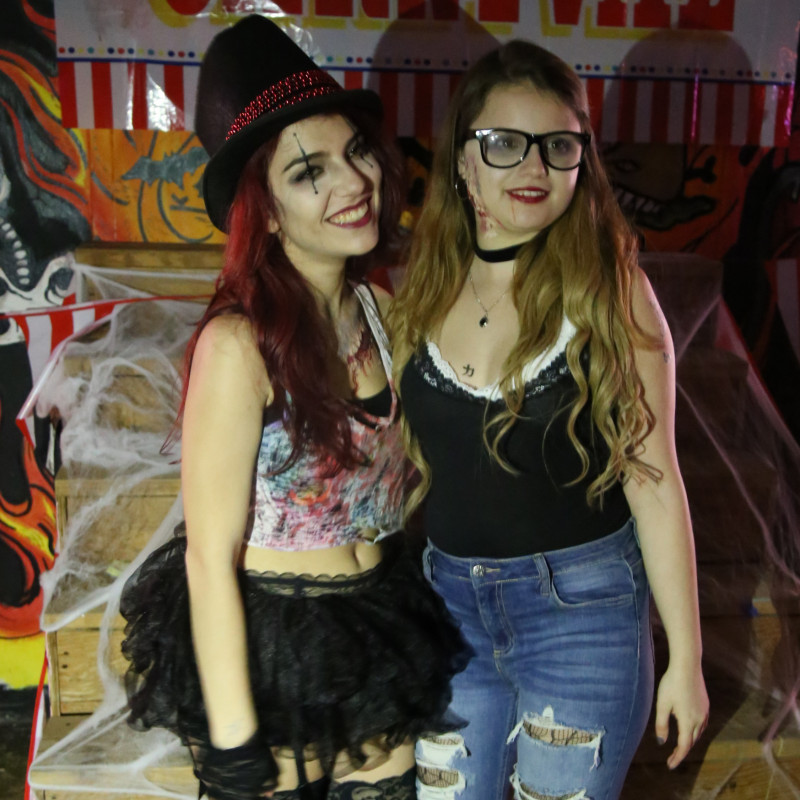
The university hosts an annual Zombie Prom, where students dance, jam to music, and dress up as zombies

In addition to its clubs, Purchase College holds several events throughout the year, accommodating the diverse musical and artistic interests of its student body. Most notably, these events include:

- Culture Shock: Culture Shock is an annual two-day music and carnival festival sponsored by the PSGA. Typically held in April, the weekend festival has featured dozens of renowned performers, including alumni students who have recently graduated from Purchase's Music Conservatory. Some notable performers include: Iggy Azalea, Flatbush Zombies, MF Doom, Lil B, Ween, Jay Electronica, SZA, Dan Deacon, Regina Spektor, Deerhoof, Pissed Jeans, Animal Collective, GZA, Cat Power, Blonde Redhead, Bouncing Souls, Ghostface Killah, Ted Leo, Biz Markie, Kool Keith, Slick Rick, Destiny's Child, Solange, Drake, Tycho, Beach Fossils, Dead Prez, The Front Bottoms, The Butchies, and Big Freedia.
- Fall Fest: An "appetizer" for Culture Shock, Fall Fest is the first of the two major music festivals at Purchase College, typically held in October. Like Culture Shock, Fall Fest features of number of bands and Purchase Music Conservatory Alumni.
- Zombie Prom: Zombie Prom is a prom-type event held annually in the spring that features live music, a DJ, and students dressed up as zombies.
- Student-run shows that take place in one of the two stages at The Stood: Whitson's or Mainstage.

=== The Stood ===
The Purchase College Student Center, which is known to the student body as simply "The Stood" was created on January 26, 2003 by Offer Ben-Arie as a recreation hall for students. Before its inception, the building which houses The Stood was a warehouse called the Butler Building. The Stood serves as a space on campus for students to express themselves outside of a school setting. The Stood is a fully equipped music venue, hosting many of the college's larger events such as: Fall Fest, Zombie Prom, SK80s, Afrodisiac, Stood-o-ween, and sometimes Culture Shock. These events usually take place on the larger of the two stages inside of The Stood, typically known as Mainstage, which has a capacity of 900. Smaller, more underground shows happen in The Stood's other performance room, Whitson's Memorial Greeting Hall, which is more commonly known as just "Whitson's" and has a capacity of 250. Students can book this room to play their own shows. Curated events sometimes happen in Whitson's, featuring larger, non-student acts. Some notable people and artists who have played in Whitson's are: Mitski, Princess Nokia, and Crumb. These events are typical to what you would see at a smaller venue in New York City, and are always free. The building is student-run and student-funded by the Mandatory Student Activity Fee.

=== Greek Life ===
Purchase College does not officially recognize fraternities or sororities on its campus, and the student body has a traditional disdain for such organizations. However, upon request, the college will allow such organizations to use space on campus, as available, to the same extent it provides space to other student organizations.

== Athletics ==
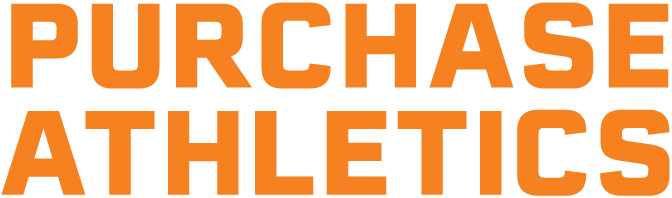
Purchase athletics wordmark

Purchase College teams, the "Purchase Panthers", participate as a member of the National Collegiate Athletic Association's Division III. The Panthers are a member of the Skyline Conference. Men's sports include baseball, basketball, cross country, lacrosse, golf, soccer, tennis and volleyball. Women's sports include softball, basketball, cross country, lacrosse, soccer, softball, tennis and volleyball.

The Purchase College Athletic Department also houses non-varsity and intramural teams and clubs. Intramural teams include basketball, flag football, indoor soccer, racquet sports, co-ed softball, dodgeball, wall handball, kickball, and volleyball.Intramural clubs include boxing club, fencing club, stage combat, cheerleading club, Nerf club, Zumba and circus skills club.

In 2014, Purchase College's Men's Soccer Program won its first Skyline Conference Championship, defeating St. Joseph's (LI) in overtime by the score of 2–1.

Despite the College's official colors of heliotrope and puce, Purchase's athletics teams use the colors orange and blue.

== Campus ==
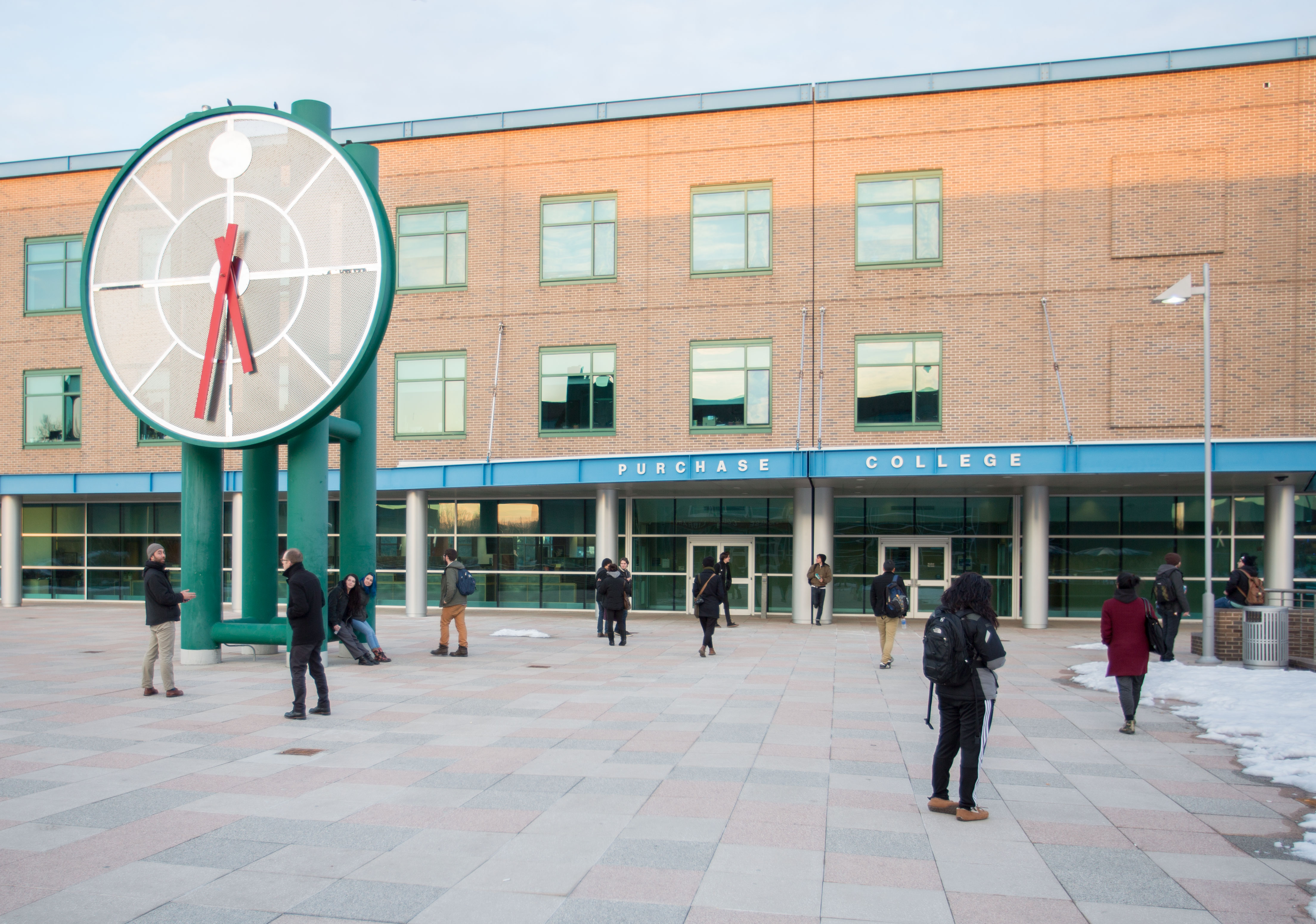
Student Services at the university

Purchase College is located on approximately 500 acres (2.0 km^{2}) in Westchester County, New York on the former Strathglass farm. The property was originally owned by Thomas Thomas, an American Revolutionary War soldier, whose family cemetery (and also with possible remains of slaves owned by Thomas Thomas and John Thomas, Jr.) remains on the campus between the south end of the Humanities and Visual Arts buildings. The college is adjacent to the Westchester County Airport, and is across the street from PepsiCo's corporate headquarters.

== Dormitories and housing ==
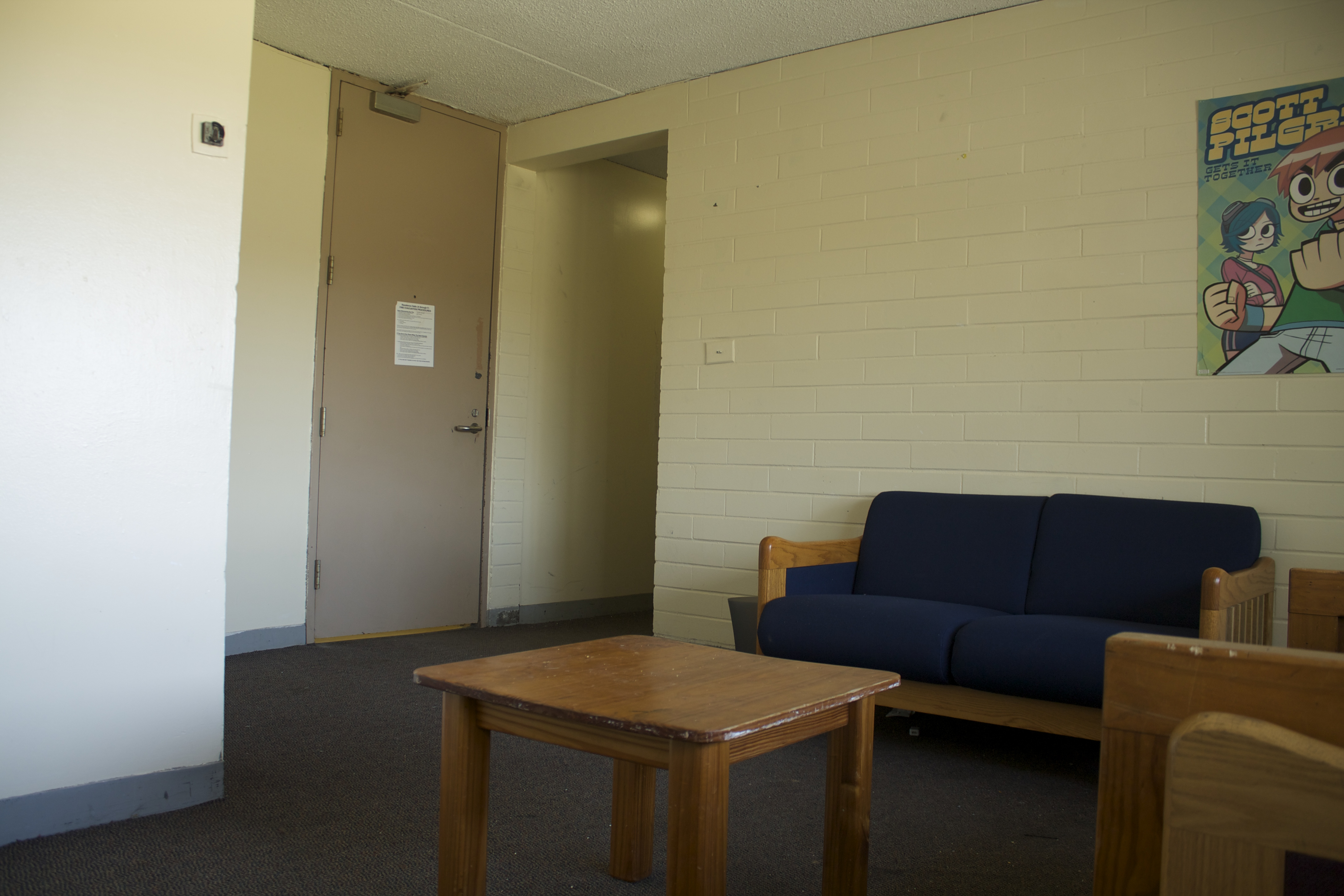
A common room at the Crossroads Residence Hall at the university

Purchase College has six dormitory halls, Crossroads, Central (formerly Big Haus), Farside, Outback, Fort Awesome, and Wayback; along with three apartment complexes, The Olde, The Commons (The Neu), and Alumni Village. Crossroads, Farside, and parts of Central house first year students and the staff in the building, one professional Residence Coordinator (RC) and two Residence Assistants (RA's) per floor, are accommodated towards offering first year students help. The other parts of Central along with Outback, Fort Awesome, Wayback, and the apartment complexes are upperclassmen housing and the selection process of these buildings are determined by the amount of credits one has. Outback residence hall is also a part of the wellness program housing the school provides which according to its page on the Purchase website "houses students committed to holistic health and wellness. Staff and residents develop programs that focus specifically on areas of Wellness including Physical, Intellectual, Vocational/Occupational, Emotional, Social (Cultural, Societal, Family, Community), Environmental and Spiritual."

In the fall of 2016, some apartments in the Commons K street apartment block caught fire during cooking activities. No students were hurt and most were able to return to their apartments, but others were housed at the neighboring Manhattanville College until replacement housing was available for them on campus.

== Architecture ==
The College's master architectural plan was created by architect Edward Larrabee Barnes and reflected the belief that "modern architecture might be able to reshape the world." It has been described as a "period piece of the 1960s" and the architects who designed and built the campus include Philip Johnson and John Burgee, Paul Rudolph, Venturi & Rauch, Gwathmey Siegel & Henderson, The Architects Collaborative, Giovanni Pasanella, and Gunnar Birkerts. The campus' original buildings were placed close together to allow the surrounding fields to remain open. The college grounds are also home to many sculptures.

== Campus sustainability ==
The College consistently ranks as one of the top sustainable colleges in the nation having ranked 72nd by the Sierra Club's America's greenest colleges. This ranking factors in the college's energy use, waste, water, food, and purchasing policies. The college is also included in the 2014 Princeton Review Guide to Green Colleges.

In 2014, the college unveiled the "Rocket" composting system, which has the capacity to handle 460 gallons of food waste every week.

== Performing Arts Center ==
Situated on the campus is the college's Performing Arts Center. It is a four-theatre complex that is the largest performing arts center in the SUNY system. The center's performance spaces include the 1400-seat, three-tiered Concert Hall with hydraulic lifts for orchestra; the 600-seat Recital Hall with rear-screen projection bay; the 700-seat PepsiCo Theatre designed by Ming Cho Lee; and the Repertory Theatre, a "black box" with flexible stage and seating configurations. Each theatre is specifically designed for the presentation of a different type of performance and many types of events.

The Performing Arts Center presents a broad range of performances – offering music, dance, theatre, comedy, and cinema. The Performing Arts center is also home to Conservatory of Theatre Arts' Purchase Repertory Theatre. The center's ongoing initiatives include artist partnerships, residency activities, and commissions.

== Neuberger Museum of Art ==
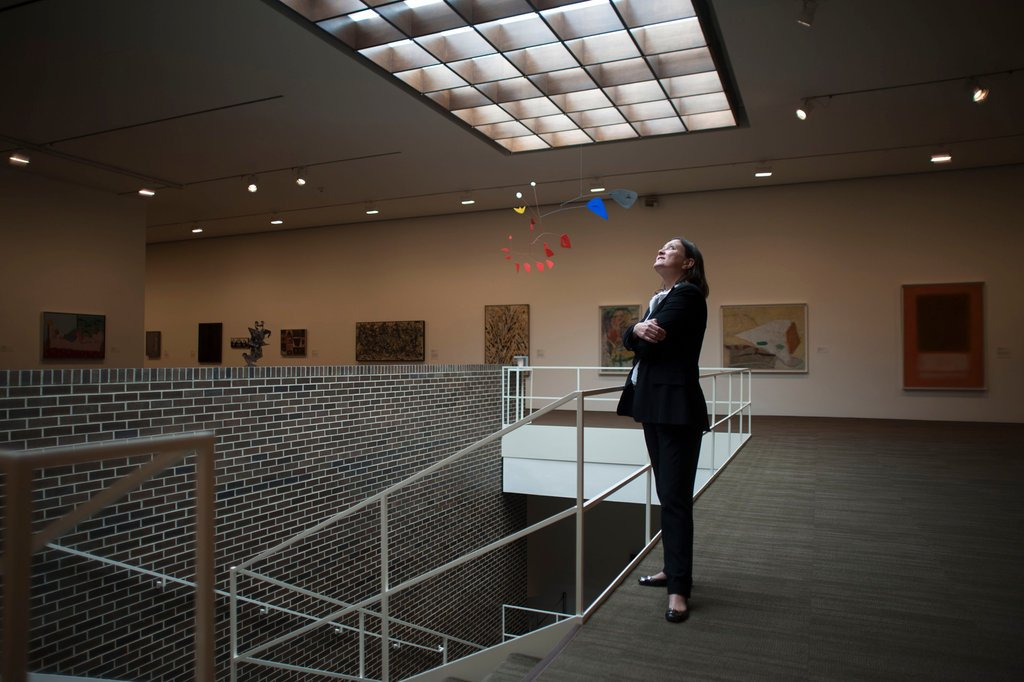
Neuberger Museum of Art, revamped in 2012, at the university

The College also houses the Neuberger Museum of Art, which is among the ten largest museums in New York and the eighth-largest university museum in the nation. The museum opened in 1972. It holds a permanent collection of more than 7,000 works of art and features a full schedule of exhibitions, lectures, films, and multimedia events. The museum presents more than a dozen exhibitions each year in addition to ongoing exhibitions from its permanent collections. The Neuberger Museum of Art has works from 20th-century masters, midcareer and emerging artists, and is well known for its permanent exhibition of African art.

== Notable faculty and alumni ==
Notable current and former faculty members include harpsichordist Bradley Brookshire; jazz bassist Todd Coolman; composer Laura Kaminsky; pianist Steven Lubin; and bassist Tim Cobb. Other faculty members include Iris Cahn, a film editor; dancer and choreographer Bill Bales, the founding Dean of Dance; dance choreographers Rosalind Newman and Sarah Stackhouse; writer Melissa Febos; and artists Liz Phillips, Antonio Frasconi, Steve Lambert, Kate Gilmore, and Hakan Topal.

Purchase College alumni are well represented throughout the arts. Actors who attended the college include Rochelle Aytes, Susie Essman, Edie Falco, Paul Schulze, Zoë Kravitz, Amanda Seales, Orlagh Cassidy, Melissa Leo, James McDaniel, Francie Swift, Janel Moloney, Chris Perfetti, Parker Posey, Ving Rhames, Carter Hudson, Josh Hartnett, Nicco Annan, Jay O. Sanders, Wesley Snipes, Sherry Stringfield, Stanley Tucci, Shea Whigham, Katrina Cunningham and Constance Wu. Other film professionals who attended Purchase College include directors Ilya Chaiken, Abel Ferrara, Hal Hartley, Bob Gosse, Jeffrey Schwarz, Michael Spiller, James Spione, A. Dean Bell, and Chris Wedge. Theatrical designers David Gallo, Brian MacDevitt, and Kenneth Posner also attended the school. Playwright Donald Margulies is a Purchase College alumnus. Dancers Kyle Abraham, Terese Capucilli, and Doug Varone attended Purchase. Experimental filmmaker Joey Huertas attended Purchase. Other artists who attended Purchase include Katherine Bradford, Allen Cohen, Gregory Crewdson, Luis Croquer, Thomas E. Franklin, Jimmy Joe Roche, Jon Kessler, Linus Coraggio, Ron Rocco, Chris Dorland, and Fred Wilson.

Musicians who are alumni include Regina Spektor, Mitski, Gabriel Garzon-Montano, Moby, Edward W. Hardy, Photay, Quentin Angus, Chris Ballew, Imani Coppola, Dan Deacon, Jack Dishel, Dan Romer, Jeffrey Lewis, Mase, Spencer Murphy, Nate Jones, Bryndon Cook, Ben Chapoteau-Katz, Daryl Palumbo, Bess Rogers, Joel Rubin, Langhorne Slim, Katherine Teck, Ice Spice, Samara Joy, Cyrille Aimee, Mal Blum, Stephanie Winters, Jenny O. and Jenny Owen Youngs, as well as the founding members of Porches, Dufus, Sheer Mag, O'Death, and Kiss Kiss.

Record producer Elite is alumni. Writer and artist Laura Vaccaro Seeger is an alumna.

Alumni from the School of Liberal Arts and Sciences include New York Assemblywoman Latrice Walker; curator Luis Croquer; and authors Nora Raleigh Baskin, Garth Greenwell, David Graeber, and Jeanne Darst. Also, scientists Jill Bargonetti and Carl Safina attended the college along with journalists Manohla Dargis and Adam Nagourney as well as film director Danny Leiner.
