= Abraham Brody =

American artist

Abraham Brody (born 1992, New York City, United States) is an American-Lithuanian artist, musician, and composer.

== Life ==
Brody studied at the University of Music and Performing Arts Vienna and the Guildhall School of Music and Drama in London.

After studying, Brody was searching for ways of expanding performance and interaction with his audiences. His early works attempt to break the barriers of the traditional performance environment, and he often interacts directly with his audiences or creates multidimensional installations using sound, elements of performance art, and video.

In 2013 he collaborated with performance artist Marina Abramović on his piece "The Violinist is Present", which helped to launch his career internationally. Since then he has created works such as Ancestors (2015), based on ancient Lithuanian ritual songs premiered at the Barbican Centre in London, has researched Siberian Buryat shamanism in his work ONGON (2016) and also composes his own music based on the folklore and singing traditions of his Lithuanian roots. In 2017 he released his solo album From the Rich Dark Earth, based on his research of Lithuanian folk traditions.

He has also collaborated with international artists such as Iva Bittová, Mariana Sadovska, and Michal Rovner. These collaborations range from improvisation-based projects (Bittová, the Public Theater New York), folklore research (Sadovska, music from the Carpathian Mountains), and an immersive performance created in partnership with Pace Gallery London and the video works of Michal Rovner.

In October 2017 he co-founded the Moscow based Slavic-Baltic neo-folk performance group Pletai, together with artists Masha Medvedchenkova, Ilya Sharov, and Masha Marchenko.

He has performed and shown his works at such places as the Barbican Centre London, Fondation Beyeler in Basel, Royal Festival Hall, Public Theater New York, Pace Gallery, Solyanka VPA Moscow, Fabrika Centre for Creative Industries Moscow, Municipal House Smetana Hall in Prague, Galerija Vartai in Vilnius, and the parasol unit foundation for contemporary art in London, among others.

== Discography ==
- From the Rich Dark Earth (Lithuania, 2017)
- ‘’Crossings’’ (2019)
