= Robert Ladislas Derr =

American visual artist and educator

- Education: Rhode Island School of Design
- Known for: Performance art, Photography, Video, Installation
- Movement: Contemporary art
- Website: www.robertladislasderr.com

Robert Ladislas Derr (born 1970) is an American visual artist and educator born in Cincinnati.

== Education ==
Derr attended the Art Academy of Cincinnati, where he completed his BFA. He completed his MFA at the Rhode Island School of Design. He attended The Photography Institute National Graduate Seminar at New York University in 1994.

== Select works ==
In recent years, Derr has created such works as All That Is Solid Melts Into Air (2025) presents an ice bench to demonstrate how the bourgeoisie preserve control; Exchange & Flow (2022), which explores Hatteras Island’s ocean currents; Sound of Days (2021), an animation of each day of Black Mountain College’s influential twenty-five year existence; New Day (2020), which transforms Kenneth Noland's painting into a social experience; the Dionysian (a la Nietzsche) Ball Breaker (2019); Escaping Altamont (2018), a conceptual film inspired by Thomas Wolfe's Look Homeward Angel and created with the help of 37 locals; Day In, Day Out (2017), a 3-channel video installation of the body in spare, experiential exercises staged in idyllic landscapes that fabricate self-directed escapism; Kiss the Sky (2017), featuring 150 smooches for a sesquicentennial; and a mix of contemporary art and basketball in Dribble (2016).

- Falling Gretel Dung Miss Garland Hell Spaces, 2013
  - One snippet led on to another so that the 'performance' became a poem of chance, like a literary version of the Surrealist game "The Exquisite Corpse." A literal space-time to probe the significance of virtual interconnectivity, underscored more than the contrast between traditional and new ways of interacting. Derr succeeded in uncannily generating many of the consequences for reading, interacting, remembering, and interpreting, precipitated by digital modes of communication. Derr's project recalls the environment of the Net that is also "by design an interruption system, a machine for dividing attention."
- In My Shoes, 2009–2013
  - Sounds of traffic, insects, and wind intermix with the memories of the shoes' owners being read aloud by the artist. For the viewer, the arrhythmic motion is initially disorienting, akin to vertigo. The viewer becomes an active agent in the process of engaging with and re-creating each memory.
- Discovering Columbus, 2011
  - Derr explores the ten towns in the United States named after Christopher Columbus using experimental geography tactics. The ten towns include Columbia (Maryland), Columbia (Missouri), Columbia (South Carolina), Columbiana (Ohio), Columbus (Georgia), Columbus (Indiana), Columbus (Mississippi), Columbus (Ohio), Columbus (Wisconsin), and Washington (District of Columbia). While Christopher Columbus's explorations participated in cataloging the natural world, systemizing knowledge, and classifying peoples, they did so from a single point of view that ignored the beliefs and values of the cultures he encountered. That Derr's undertaking is evocative in this regard of what Foucault called a genealogist is because it too seeks to reveal disjunction and dispersion, disparity and overlay, at the origins of things, of whatever is discovered. Proust thought that "the only true voyage of discovery" was to see through the eyes of others. What Derr presents us with here is an experience of time "retained differently."
- In Play, 2007-ongoing
  - Derr plays ping-pong with artists and writers in front of the cameras. Participants include Vito Acconci, Vicki Goldberg, Erwin Wurm, Peter Garfield, Martha Buskirk, Gary Metz, Terry Barrett, Cal Kowal, William Anastasi, Patty Chang, Dennis Oppenheim, Dan Graham, Michael Snow, Marcy B Freedman, Kate Gilmore, Thomas Zummer, and Navjotika Kumar.
- Chance, 2005-ongoing
  - An experiment in geography and psychogeography, these are walk performances with the cameras through cities and capitals worldwide. Viewers' die rolls determine the direction that Derr takes through the streets. Derr dresses in a mirrored suit, and wears four video cameras that capture the scenes from his front, back and sides, as he proceeds on a walk. Exchanging his pedestrian status for the role of the spectacle, as he becomes art, he chooses mirrors "for the dichotomy of being real and illusionary in the streetscape."

== Books ==
- Water, Water Everywhere: Paean to a Vanishing Resource, Baksun Books, ISBN 978-1887997300
- Beneath a Petroliferous Moon, The Mendel Gallery, ISBN 978-1896359816
- 100x100=900, Magmart Festival, ISBN 978-1291696080
- Playing the City: Interviews, Sternberg Press, ISBN 978-1-934105-95-5
