= Michael Rush =

Michael Rush is the name of:

- Michael Rush (museum director) (1949–2015), American art museum director
- Michael Rush (rower) (1844–1922), Irish Australian sculler
- Mike Rush, Democratic member of the Massachusetts Senate
