= Effects of the Great Recession on museums =

Art museums in the United States and the United Kingdom were affected greatly by the Great Recession. Dwindling financial endowments from wealthy patrons forced some museums to make difficult and controversial decisions to deaccession artwork from their collections to gain funds, or in the case of the Rose Art Museum, to close the institution and sell the entire collection.

Such actions have prompted censure from Museum organizations such as the Museums, Libraries and Archives Council in the UK and the Association of Art Museum Directors in the US. These organizations charge that the actions of their members were in violation of not only their ethics code but also the core of their mission- to provide access to a fund of cultural heritage for future scholarship- by selling works to private buyers for purposes other than funding new acquisitions. Consideration of the dire financial state of these institutions, and the intensifying effect that any punitive action by an ethics organization will have on the finances of an individual museum, has fostered debate on the merits of deaccessioning.

== Background ==
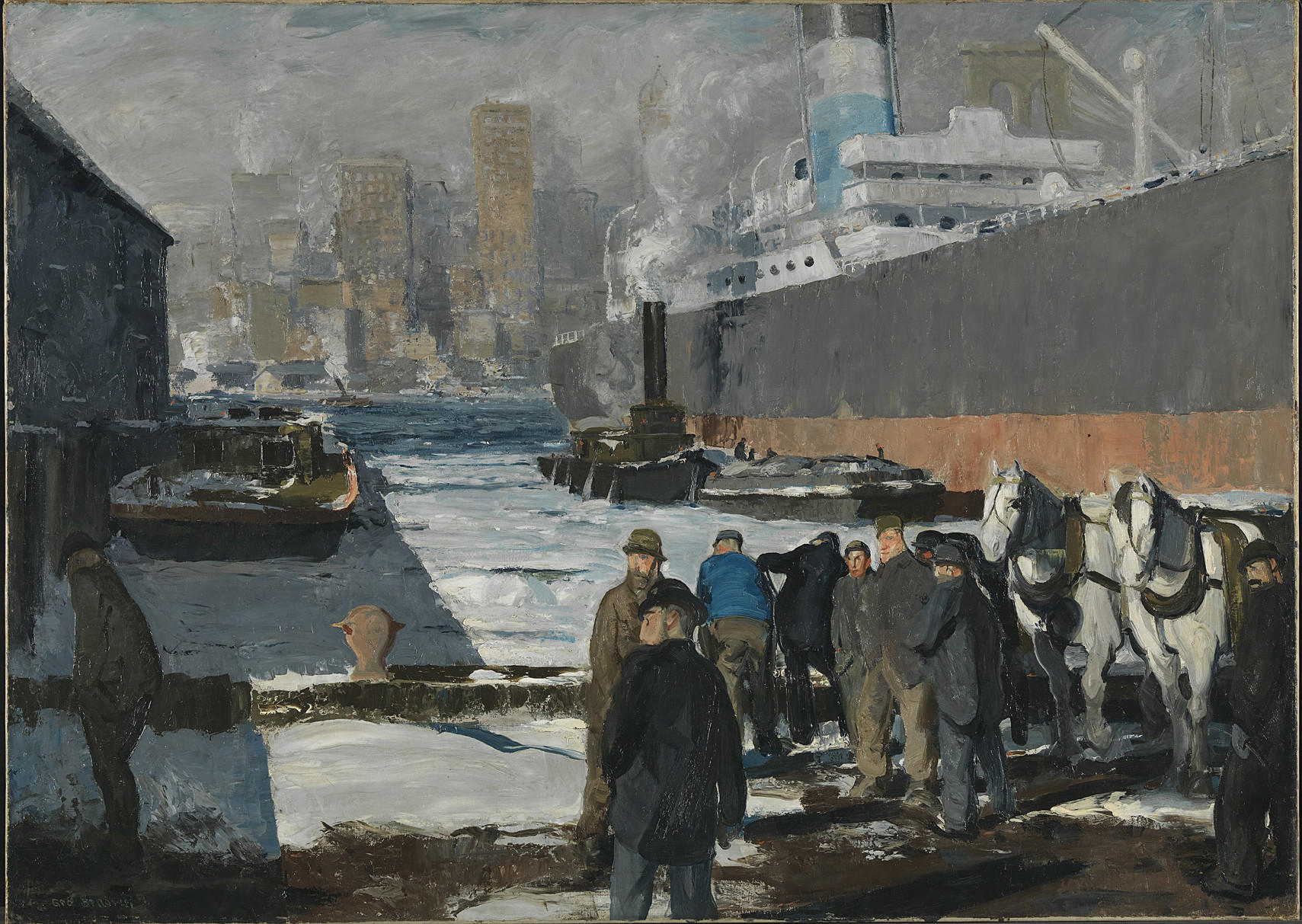
George Wesley Bellows' Men of the Docks (1912, oil on canvas) is one of several paintings that Randolph College intends to auction

Art museums have struggled to meet their operating costs for years, especially as many have "suggested donations" rather than entrance fees, or have no entrance fees whatsoever, relying on endowments and membership dues. In 2006, this began to change at many museums: on 3 June 2006, the Art Institute of Chicago announced that its suggested donation of $12 would become mandatory, and in July of that year the Metropolitan Museum of Art raised its suggested admission fee from $15 to $20.

On 1 October 2007, the board of Randolph College decided to auction four works from its collection in order to raise funds for the college: Peaceable Kingdom, by Edward Hicks; Men of the Docks, by George Bellows; Through the Arroyo, by Ernest Hennings; and Troubadour, by Rufino Tamayo. The sale was halted in November when a court injunction against it was granted to a group of alumnae and others. When this coalition raised only half of the required one million dollar bond, the court lifted the injunction and the college proceeded to sell Troubador at Christie's in April 2008. The other paintings are currently held in a Christie's warehouse, to be sold when markets rebound.

By October 2008, museum directors could clearly see that the crisis would greatly affect the operation of their museums. After Lehman Brothers, a major corporate sponsor of the MOMA, filed for bankruptcy in September 2008, MOMA director Glenn D. Lowry was quoted as saying "We know there’s a storm at sea and we know it’s going to hit land and it could get ugly".

== The National Academy of Design ==
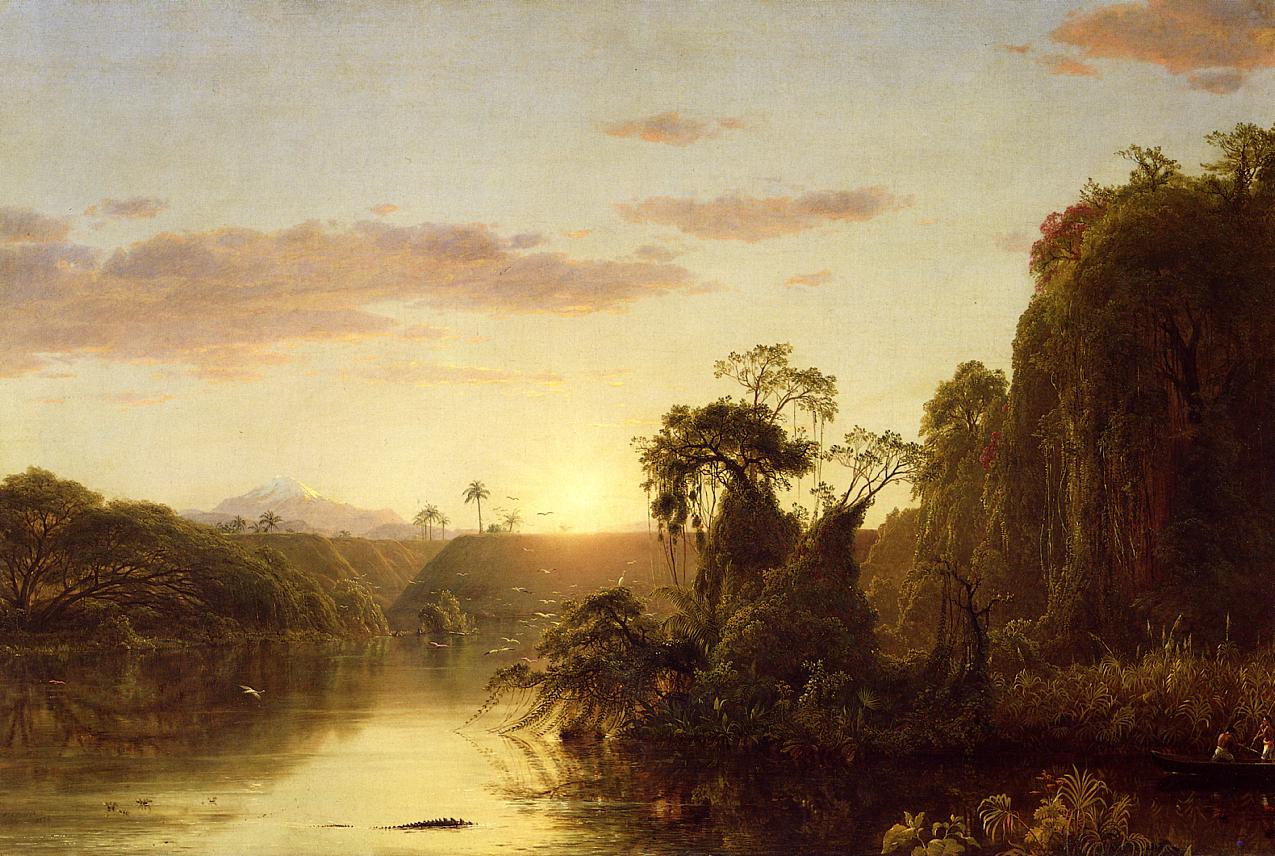
Scene on the Magdalene (1854), by Frederic Edwin Church, oil on canvas. One of two paintings sold by the National Academy of Design

On 5 December 2008, the National Academy of Design announced that it had sold two canvases by Hudson River School painters for 13.5 million dollars in order to meet its operating costs: Mount Mansfield, Vermont, by Sanford Robinson Gifford; and Scene on the Magdalene, by Frederic Edwin Church. The decision drew criticism from the Association of Art Museum Directors, who strongly oppose deaccessioning to gain funds for any purpose other than acquiring art. The director of the academy, Carmine Branagan, argued that because the academy does not buy artwork but acquires pieces only through donations, the guideline should not apply.

The decision was made by the board of the academy, which is composed of 16 prominent American artists such as Chuck Close, Jasper Johns, Frank Gehry, Wolf Kahn, and Helen Frankenthaler as well as 5 non-artist advisory board members. Some have attributed the poor financial state of the academy to its unusual leadership, as most museums are governed by professional administrators and curators.

The AAMD struck back, issuing an e-mail to its members ordering them not to loan works to the academy or to collaborate with it on exhibitions. The apparent harshness of this reaction drew criticism from some quarters, such as Patty Gerstenblith, a law professor at DePaul University and author of Art, Cultural Heritage, and the Law: "If it’s a choice between selling a Rauschenberg and keeping the museum doors open, I think there’s some justification for selling the painting". Others have supported the AAMD's decision, initiating a debate on the ethics of deaccessioning. According to Dan Monroe, director of the Peabody Essex Museum, "The fact is as soon as you breach this principle, everybody’s got a hardship case. It would be impossible to control the outcome."

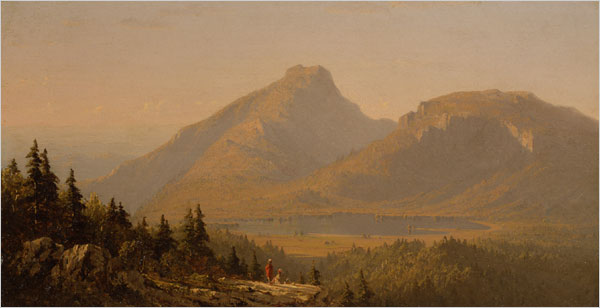
Sanford Robinson Gifford's Mount Mansfield, Vermont, 1859 (Oil on canvas) was the other painting sold by the National Academy of Design

On 9 March 2009, representatives from the academy and the AAMD met to discuss the academy's financial future. The academy agreed not to sell any more artworks, but there was no promise to lift sanctions on the part of the AAMD. They also agreed to change the composition of their board of directors: the new board will consist of 11 artist members and 10 non-artist members.

=== Legislation ===
On 17 March 2009, a bill that would ban museums from selling artwork to meet operating costs was proposed by Richard Brodsky in the New York State Assembly. It would allow museums in New York State to use money from deaccessioned artwork only for the purposes of acquiring new art or for preserving works in the collection.

== Bailout of MOCA ==
In December 2008 the Museum of Contemporary Art, Los Angeles reported that it had lost over $44 million of its $50 million endowment over nine years. The museum considered merging with the Los Angeles County Museum of Art but was approached by the billionaire Eli Broad, whose 30 million dollar bailout offer was accepted on December 23. Museum director Jeremy Strick also announced that he would resign.

== Rose Art Museum ==
Brandeis University has drawn criticism after its 26 January 2009 surprise announcement that it would close the Rose Art Museum by the end of the summer. Several of the university's large donors were reportedly particularly hard hit due to investment with Bernard Madoff. Attorney General of Massachusetts Martha Coakley said that her office would conduct a detailed review of the decision.

After general protest from students, faculty, and the Rose family, Brandeis announced that it would indeed not close the museum immediately, but instead form an eleven-person committee to discuss the future of the museum. However, Brandeis also released a statement on its website that the fate of the museum's collection was not within the scope of the committee, and that all museum staff jobs would be terminated on 30 June 2009.

As of 2011, the Rose Art Museum remains open, with a celebration of its 50-year anniversary and new renovations on October 27, 2011.

== Metropolitan Museum of Art ==
In 2008-09, the Metropolitan Museum of Art's endowment lost an estimated $800 million, representing 28 percent of its value at the time. In February 2009, the museum announced that it would be freezing staff hiring, and that 15 of its 23 satellite stores nationwide would be closed. In March 2009, the museum announced the elimination of another 74 jobs, with a warning that the economy would force an overall work force reduction of 10 percent before the summer.

== Fisk University Museum ==
In August 2012, Fisk University in Nashville sold a 50% interest in 101 pieces, originally donated to the historically black college in 1949 by Georgia O'Keeffe, to Crystal Bridges Museum (founded in Bentonville by Walmart heir Alice Walton) for $30 million. Each museum will display the pieces half the time.

== Detroit Institute of Arts ==
The city of Detroit filed for Chapter 9 bankruptcy on July 18, 2013, after many years of decline which included the 2009 Chapter 11 bankruptcy of GM and Chrysler. As the Detroit Institute of Arts is city-owned, state-appointed emergency manager Kevyn Orr has sought an appraisal of billions of dollars of museum artwork.

== In the UK ==
In 2006, the town council of Bury made a controversial decision to sell A Riverbank, by L. S. Lowry from the collection of the Bury Art Gallery and Museum for £1,408,000 at Christie's. This resulted in the museum's loss of accreditation by the Museums, Libraries and Archives Council, which condemned the decision. The decision also brought criticism from art collectors, such as Frank Cohen, who was quoted as saying "People won't want to give things away to museums if they think they might be sold in future. If I give something away, I make it a condition that it is never sold." Similarly, Northampton Museum and Art Gallery made the decision to sell an Egyptian Sekhemka statue to substantial controversy. The sale raised £16 Million for the Museum but resulted in a loss of its accreditation with the Arts Council England. See Northampton Sekhemka statue.
