= Michal Rovner =

Israeli contemporary artist

- מיכל רובנר
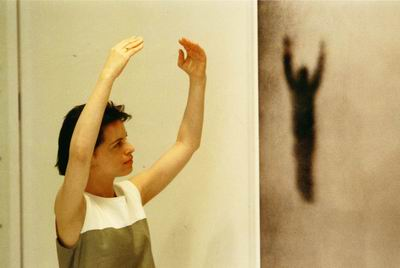
- Michal Rovner, 1991
- Born: November 7, 1957 (age 68); Tel Aviv, Israel
- Other name: Michal Rovner Hammer
- Education: Tel Aviv University, Bezalel Academy of Arts and Design
- Awards: Israel Prize (2023)

Michal Rovner (Hebrew: מיכל רובנר; born 1957), also known as Michal Rovner Hammer, is an Israeli contemporary artist, she is known for her video, photo, and cinema artwork. Rovner is internationally known with exhibitions at major museums, including the Louvre (2011) and the Whitney Museum of American Art (2002). She is the recipient of the Israel Prize for the year 2023 in the field of plastic arts.

== Biography ==
Michal Rovner was born 1957 in Tel Aviv, Israel. She studied Cinema/Television, and Philosophy at Tel Aviv University, and subsequently at the Bezalel Academy of Arts and Design in Jerusalem in 1981, receiving a BFA degree in Photography and Art in 1985.

In 1978, with artist Arie Hammer, she co-founded the private art school Camera Obscura School of Art in Tel Aviv, the city's first school for photographers. In 2005, the Camera Obscura School of Art closed due to financial reasons.

She moved to New York City in 1987. Rovner was married to Arie Hammer.

Rovner splits her time between living on a moshav outside Jerusalem and living in NYC.

== Art career ==
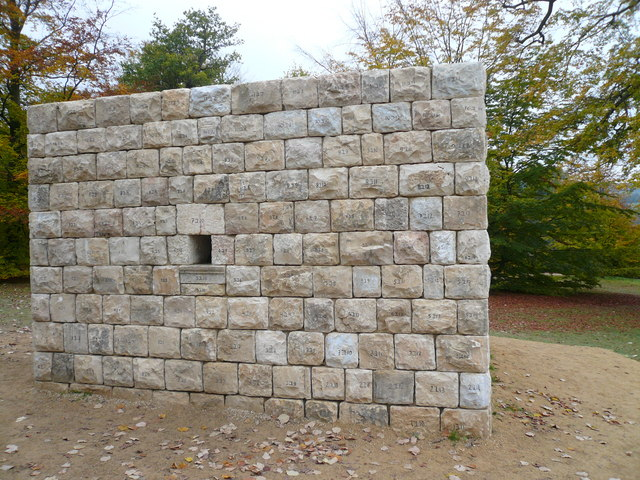
"Makom," sculpture by Michal Rovner, Chatsworth Gardens

Rovner said about her work in 2016, "my work is not directly related to the Israeli-Palestinian question. I present situations of conflict, tensions, fractures.. vulnerability. (...) I always begin with reality. I record it and subsequently, little by little, I extract the image of reality, which becomes more fuzzy, losing its own definition, and bringing therefore something else."

In the early 1990s, she worked with director Robert Frank on two films, One Hour-C’est Vrai (1990), an experimental film for French television, and Last Supper (1992), which she cowrote.

In her early photography series Outside (1990–1991), "for two years [Rovner] photographed a Bedouin hut in the Israeli desert, then retouched each photo in order to create a spectral, shifting image of the modest structure isolated in an inhospitable setting." For the Decoy series (1991), she distorted radar and surveillance images to create photographs of indistinct groups of people with blurred features. In One-Person Game Against Nature (1992–93), she again distorted images, this time her own photographs of people floating in the Dead Sea.

In 1996, Rovner began to use film and video, creating works featuring anonymous crowds of people or animals, as in Monoprints of Birds (1998). While she has eschewed direct political commentary in her work, in 1995–96 she produced installations for the Israel-Lebanon border that were situated on electric fences and guard towers in the line of ongoing exchanges of fire. These were complemented by her video Border (1996–97), in which she futilely attempted to demarcate and cross the border from Israel into Lebanon.

Her video Notes (2001) was a collaboration with the composer Philip Glass; Rovner used footage of a group of people walking on an inclined angle, and Glass composed music inspired by this moving image (their collaboration was documented in the 2003 documentary Looking Glass). Time Left (2002), a multichannel-video installation comprising images of endless rows of indistinct beings, was the centerpiece of her mid-career retrospective at the Whitney Museum of American Art in New York in 2002. For the exhibition In Stone, at PaceWildenstein in New York City in 2004, she mixed sculpture and video by projecting minute images of crowds onto tablets of stone, blurring the line between image and text.

Rovner represented Israel at the 50th Venice Biennale in 2003 and turned the Israeli pavilion into one of the most interesting one that year. Michael Rush writing on the work for Artnet said "....Rovner's media art is like no other. She stands alone in the pure and artful way she blends digital technology to suit her own vision. Her use of fine materials tools makes it look like the smoothest of marble or the supplest of paints..."

In the film Fields of Fire (2005), Rovner's images of oilfields in the Republic of Kazakhstan reflect the persistent instability of a region at the epicenter of international scrutiny. Living Landscape (2005), a site-specific video wall at Yad Vashem in Jerusalem, projects a montage of pre-WWII footage of dances, music, and daily lives of European Jews.

Rovner's installation in the Louvre in 2011 was called "Histories". The Louvre chose Rovner for its Summer season outdoor display, next to the entrance Pyramid designed by architect I.M. Pei. Rovner's idea was to explore the themes of physical and psychological borders and of identity. In winter 2012 Rovner presented "Topography" show in Pace Gallery, New York, continuing environment and science theme. Her 2016 series Night takes a step back from some of these social questions and "explores the troubling presence of jackals around her house, a metaphor for the primitive and impenetrable that lies within each of us."

Her works are included in public museum collections around the world including those of; the Los Angeles County Museum of Art (LACMA), San Francisco Museum of Modern Art (SFMoMA), Metropolitan Museum of Art, Museum of Contemporary Art, Chicago (MCA Chicago), Museum of Modern Art (MoMA), Tel Aviv Museum of Art, Fine Arts Museums of San Francisco (FAMSF), North Carolina Museum of Art, and Whitney Museum of American Art, among others.

== Selected exhibitions ==
Rovner's first solo exhibition was at Dizengoff Center in Tel Aviv in 1987.

- 2016 - Night, Pace Gallery, 510 West 25th Street, New York, September 16–October 22, 2016.
- 2015 - Dislocations, Multimedia Art Museum, Moscow, September 18–November 29, 2015.
- 2015 - Panorama, Pace London, 6 Burlington Gardens, April 29–June 15, 2015.
- 2014 - Nofim, Shoshana Wayne Gallery, Santa Monica, May 10–July 12, 2014.
- 2012 - Topography, Pace Gallery, 508 West 25th Street, New York, November 8–December 22, 2012.
- 2011 - Histoires, Musée du Louvre, Paris, May 19–October 24.
- 2011 - Making of Makom, L’Espace Culturel Louis Vuitton, Paris, May 18–29, 2011.
- 2009 - Frequency, Ivorypress Art + Books Space, Madrid, October 8, 2009 – January 16, 2010.
- 2009 - Particles of Reality, DHC/ART Foundation for Contemporary Art, Montreal, May 21–September 27, 2009.
- 2008 - Michal Rovner: Video, Sculpture, Installation, Heckscher Museum of Art, Huntington, New York, June 28–September 28.
- 2008 - Adama, Shoshana Wayne Gallery, Santa Monica, California, April 29–June 14, 2008.
- 2007 - Michal Rovner, Galerie Haas & Fuchs, Berlin, November 3–December 28, 2007.
- 2006 - Fields of Fire, PaceWildenstein, 534 West 25th Street, New York, February 16–March 18, 2006.
- 2005 - Fields, Jeu de Paume in collaboration with Festival d’Automne à Paris, Paris, October 3, 2005 – January 8, 2006. Traveled to: Tel Aviv Museum of Art, Israel, April 6–July 29, 2006.
- 2005 - Recent Works, Gow Langsford Gallery, Auckland, New Zealand, March 15–April 9, 2005.
- 2004 - in stone, PaceWildenstein, 534 West 25th Street, New York, April 30–June 5 (extended through July 16), 2004.
- 2003 - Against Order? Against Disorder? 50th International Art Exhibition, La Biennale di Venezia, Israeli Pavilion, Venice, June 15–November 2, 2003.
- 2003 - Coexistence, Studio Stefania Miscetti, Rome, May 9–August 17, 2003.
- 2002 - Michal Rovner: The Space Between, Whitney Museum of American Art, New York City

== See also ==
- List of Israeli visual artists
- Women in Israel
- Visual arts in Israel
