= Gannit Ankori =

Israeli art historian

Gannit Ankori (Hebrew: גנית אנקורי) is an Israeli art historian. She is Professor of Fine Arts and chair in Israeli Art at the Department of Fine Arts at Brandeis University. In June 2020, she was appointed interim Director and Chief Curator of the Rose Art Museum at Brandeis University, and in December 2020 she was confirmed in these positions.

She was previously chair of the Department of Art History at Hebrew University in Jerusalem.

Ankori specializes in gender studies, Palestinian art, and the art of the Jewish diaspora. Ankori is regarded as a "champion" of Palestinian art and has devoted two decades of her career to the study of Palestinian art which she views as a continuous artistic tradition before and after the Nakba of 1948. She has also written books and curated an exhibition on the artwork of Mexican artist Frida Kahlo.

Her sister is the actress Gilat Ankori.

== Palestinian Art controversy ==
According to Adila Laïdi-Hanieh, Ankori's 2005 book Palestinian Art caused controversy within Palestinian art circles, including the League of Palestinian Artists, and international Arab media due to what they say was unreferenced use of material from research published by the Palestinian artist and art historian Kamal Boullata since 1989.

In the Fall 2007 issue of Art Journal, Joseph Massad, Professor of Modern Arab Politics and Intellectual History at Columbia University, published "Permission to paint: Palestinian art and the colonial encounter", a review of Ankori's book Palestinian Art, Kamal Boullata's Istihdar al-Makan (استحضار المكان), and Samia Halaby's Liberation Art of Palestine. In his review, Massad also accused Ankori of illegitimately appropriating the work of Kamal Boullata, a charge which Ankori viewed as defamatory. Ankori threatened to sue for defamation in English courts. Critics of the practice of suing for defamation in English courts, where "libel defendants nearly always lose" call it 'libel tourism'.

The College Art Association of America (CAA), which publishes Art Journal, agreed to issue an apology to Ankori, to pay her $75,000, and to send a letter to its institutional subscribers, stating that the Massad review "contained factual errors and certain unfounded assertions" in order to avoid the libel suit. Massad acknowledged "minor errors", but not libel, and accused the CAA of cowardice. CAA executive director Linda Downs told The Forward that, while "there were mistakes" in the review, the journal agreed to pay only because it could not afford to fight out the case.

== Publications ==
=== Books ===
Ankori has published extensively in the fields of Mexican, Palestinian, and Israeli art, as well as feminist cultural studies. Her articles have been printed in Hebrew, Arabic, French, German, and English.

- Ankori, Gannit (2006). Palestinian art. London: Reaktion. ISBN 978-1861892591.
- Kahlo, Frida; Dexter, Emma; Barson, Tanya; Ankori, Gannit (2005). Frida Kahlo. London: Tate Publishing. ISBN 1854375865.
- Ankori, Gannit (2002). Imaging her selves: Frida Kahlo's poetics of identity and fragmentation. Westport, Conn: Greenwood Press. ISBN 978-0313315657.
- The Fractured Self: Identity and Fragmentation in the Art of Frida Kahlo, 1994. Theses, Ph.D. Department of History of Art, Hebrew University of Jerusalem.

=== Articles ===
- "Yocheved Weinfeld's portraits of the self", Gannit Ankori, (Woman's Art Journal, vol. 10 no.2, 1989)
