= Chris Dorland =

American painter (born 1978)

- Born: Montreal, Quebec, Canada
- Occupations: Artist, director-at-large at magenta plains
- Spouse: Erin Knutson
- Website: chris-dorland.com

Chris Dorland (born 1978, Montreal) is a Canadian/American contemporary artist based in New York City. His paintings and digital screen-based works collapse hyper-representation and hyper-abstraction by manipulating together digital files and software and paint. His work is included in the Bronx Museum, the Whitney Museum of Art and the Neuberger Museum of Art.

== Early life and education ==
Dorland was born in Montreal, Quebec. He received his BFA from State University of New York at Purchase.

== Artwork ==
Dorland is interested in the merging of computer culture with the art of painting. His large-scale, glitchy paintings and moving-image works reflect the cross sections of art history, artificial intelligence, Internet culture, video games, and machine vision. His neon-hued dystopian abstractions layer and compress digital detritus into glitch datascapes.

To achieve this, Dorland employs a combination of scanning, printing, and drone-based image capture to develop layered compositions that reference hyperreality, digital electronics, and capitalism in an aesthetic reminiscent of tech noir. His work incorporates processes associated with computing and networked media to construct accumulative, fragmented compositions.

In Frieze, writer Natasha Stagg has situated Dorland's practice in relation to cyberpunk and science fiction, noting affinities with films such as Blade Runner, RoboCop, and Johnny Mnemonic, as well as the video game Cyberpunk 2077.

In his essay "Future Ruins and Haunted Screens in the Post-Digital Present," Robert Hobbs frames Dorland's work in relation to themes of simulation, entropy, and the condition of the ruin, drawing on his earlier scholarship on artists including Robert Smithson, Peter Halley, and Sterling Ruby.

=== Architectural and World's Fair paintings ===
Beginning in the early 2000s, Dorland developed a body of paintings based on world's fair architecture, modernist pavilions, architectural models, and public spaces. Drawing on archival photographs and digitally manipulated source imagery, the works explored themes of futurity, technological progress, mediation, and historical memory. Writing in Art Papers in 2005, Sylvie Fortin described the paintings as reactivating the legacy of 1960s architectural utopianism through processes of excavation and reprocessing, while Susan Emerling later placed the work within a broader investigation of photography, image degradation, and representation.

=== Video and architectural interventions ===
From the late 2010s, Dorland expanded his practice to include video works and large-scale architectural installations incorporating flat-panel displays, LED displays, steel wall stud systems, reflective surfaces, and other industrial materials. The shift coincided with his increasing use of aluminium composite panel substrates in place of traditional canvas. In discussing Dorland's 2018 exhibition ‘‘Civilian’’, Robert Hobbs described the steel stud structures as extending the work into what he termed an "architectural field," enveloping and obstructing the gallery space and directing viewers’ movement in ways that reflect concerns present throughout the artist's practice.

=== Screenscrapes (2020–present) ===
The Screenscrapes are an ongoing series of large-scale paintings that combine digital image processing, generative image systems, scanning, filtering, and algorithmic manipulation with painting processes. Executed in acrylic polymer, pigment, gesso, UV coating, and printed film on linen, the works are developed through the collection and recombination of digitally sourced imagery before being translated into composite painted surfaces. A recurring feature of the series is the use of painted whiteouts that interrupt and obscure portions of the image field.

== Grants and awards ==
Dorland is recipient of a number of awards, including the Rema Hort Mann Grant, the Pollock-Krasner Foundation Grant, and the Marie Walsh Sharpe Space Program. He is an alumnus of the Art & Law residency program.

== Exhibitions ==
Dorland's work has been exhibited at FRONT International: The Cleveland Triennial for Contemporary Art, the Queens Museum of Art, the Museo Nacional De Bellas Artes in Santiago, White Flag Projects in St-Louis, and The Suburban in Oak Park, Illinois. He has exhibited at Lyles & King, Martos LA, Rhona Hoffman Gallery, Marc Selwyn Fine Art, Sikkema Jenkins, Marianne Boesky Gallery, Valentina Bonomo Gallery, and Super Dakota, in Brussels.

== Publications and critical reception ==
In 2026, Robert Hobbs published Chris Dorland : Future Ruins (Hirmer Publishers), the first monographic study dedicated to Dorland's work. The book situates Dorland's practice within a broader discourse on technological mediation, image degradation, and the aesthetics of digital systems. Drawing on themes that have recurred throughout his scholarship, including his writing on artists such as Robert Smithson, Hobbs frames Dorland's work in relation to concepts of entropy, fragmentation, and the evolving condition of the ruin. Within this context, Dorland's practice is discussed as engaging analogous concerns within contemporary networked and algorithmic environments.

== Reviews ==
Dorland has been featured and his art reviewed in The New York Times, Frieze magazine, Art Review, Artnet, The Art Newspaper,, Right Click Save,,Art Papers, and Border Crossings.

== Curation ==
Dorland is co-director at Magenta Plains gallery at Canal Street and Bowery in Manhattan. He has curated a number of art exhibitions; most notably Skin Jobs at Marc Selwyn Fine Art in Los Angeles and DATA TRASH at I-20 Gallery in New York City.

== Commissions ==
Dorland has been commissioned to create public art projects by Art Production Fund and the New Museum, and Juilliard School of Music.
