= Luis Croquer =

American museum and gallery curator (born 1968)

- Occupation: Gallery curator

Luis Croquer (born 1968) is an American museum and gallery curator.

The son of a Venezuelan diplomat, Croquer travelled widely in his early years. He studied anthropology at Goldsmith's College and went on to take a Master's degree in Art History at State University of New York at Purchase, as a Fulbright scholar.

In New York, Croquer worked as a curator at El Museo del Barrio. He moved to Detroit in December 2008 to take up the post of Director at the Museum of Contemporary Art, where he oversaw a $350,000 refurbishment of the main building. He was the first permanent director appointed to the museum.

In 2012, he was appointed Deputy Director of Art and Education at the Henry Art Gallery in Seattle and in 2017 was named the Henry and Lois Foster Director of the Rose Art Museum at Brandeis University. Croquer stepped down as head of the Rose Art Museum in June 2020.
