= Sam Hunter (art historian) =

American art historian (1923–2014)

- Born: January 5, 1923
- Died: July 27, 2014 (aged 91)
- Education: Williams College
- Occupations: Art Historian, Art critic, Author, Curator, Professor, Museum Director
- Spouse(s): Edys Hunter (1954-1976); Maïa Hunter (1986-2000)+(2006-2014)

Sam Hunter (January 5, 1923 – July 27, 2014) was an American historian of modern art. He was emeritus professor of art history at Princeton University and an art historian, author, museum director, professor and curator.

== Life ==
A native of Springfield, Massachusetts, Hunter graduated from Williams College in 1944. He served in the U.S. Navy from 1943–46, rising to the rank of lieutenant junior grade and receiving five battle stars.

Sam Hunter began his professional career in 1947, when he joined the New York Times as an art critic for a two and a half year stint. He studied at the American Academy in Rome and the University of Florence through the Hubbard Hutchinson Fellowship, earning a certificate of studies in 1951. While in Florence he studied with Bernard Berenson at I Tatti and with Roberto Longhi. He spent a year as an editor with art publisher Harry N. Abrams Inc. before serving as editor of Arts Magazine. In 1954 he taught at UCLA in Los Angeles, and was then called to the Museum of Modern Art in New York.

He was an author, an emeritus professor of art history at Princeton University, director of the Jewish Museum, founding director of the Rose Art Museum at Brandeis University, Director of The Poses Institute of Fine Arts, acting director of the Minneapolis Institute of Art, and a visiting professor at the Clark Art Institute at Williams College, Harvard University and various other institutions of higher learning. While associate curator at the Museum of Modern Art in New York, he organized the first major museum exhibitions of the work of Jackson Pollock and David Smith.

He penned monographs, exhibition catalogues, articles, wrote the original book on the collections of the Museum of Modern Art and contributed to textbooks and various treatments of modern art that are used at universities all over the world. In addition to curating many museum and gallery exhibitions, Hunter has written on Francis Bacon, Tom Wesselmann, George Segal, Arnaldo Pomodoro, Jackson Pollock, Robert Rauschenberg, Isamu Noguchi, Larry Rivers, Alex Katz, Tony Rosenthal, Jean Dubuffet, Hans Hofmann, Philip Guston, Leonard Nelson, and many other modern artists.

Hunter's early photographs of Francis Bacon and his studio, taken in London in 1950, were most recently seen in the 2008/9 Francis Bacon exhibition that originated at the Tate Modern in London, went to the Museo del Prado in Barcelona and ended at the Metropolitan Museum of Art in New York, and that were used in the accompanying exhibition catalogue.

Hunter was a pioneer of 20th Century Art History who helped to create and build the field of art history as we know it today, along with his contemporary colleagues, art historians Thomas Hess, Harold Rosenberg, Clement Greenberg, Dore Ashton and Irving Sandler, among others.

Hunter died aged 91 in Princeton, New Jersey on July 27, 2014.

== Works ==
- Larry Rivers, 1965
- American art since 1945, in Will Grohmann, ed., New art around the world; painting and sculpture, 1966
- American art of the 20th century, 1970
- Modern art: painting, sculpture, architecture, 1976
- George Segal, 1984
- Leonard Nelson: A Life in Art, 2001
