= Rose Art Museum =

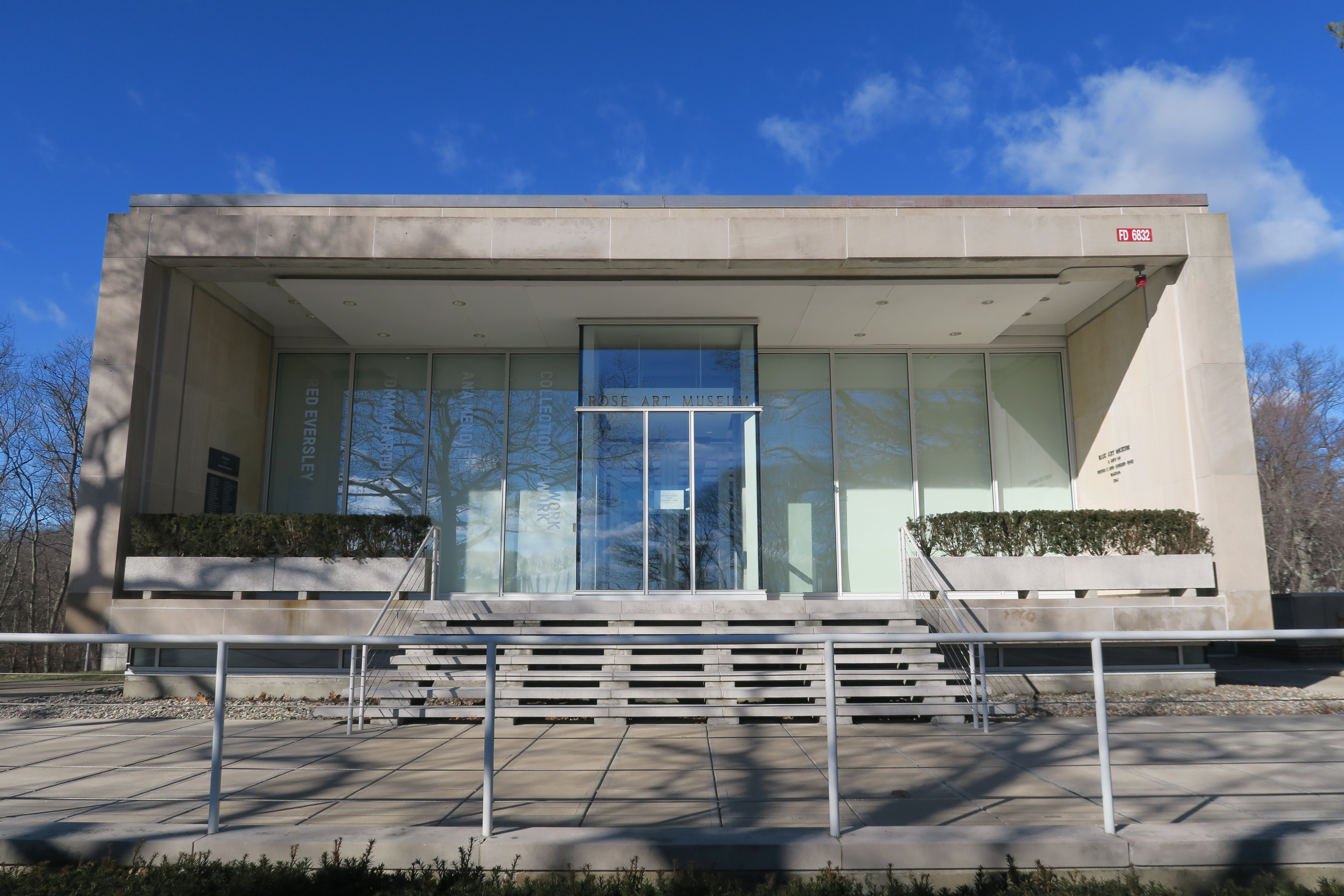
- Established: 1961
- Location: Waltham, Massachusetts, US
- Coordinates: 42.365611°N 71.262556°W
- Type: Art museum
- Collection size: 9,000
- Visitors: 13,000
- Director: Gannit Ankori
- Architect: Harrison & Abramovitz (1961, 1974)
- Owner: Brandeis University
- Public transit access: MBTA; Brandeis/Roberts
- Website: www.brandeis.edu/rose/

The Rose Art Museum, founded in 1961, is a part of Brandeis University in Waltham, Massachusetts, US. Named after founding benefactors Edward and Bertha Rose, it offers temporary exhibitions, and it displays and houses works of art from its permanent collection of 9,000 objects. The museum has one of the largest collections of modern and contemporary art in New England. Since its inauguration, the Rose Art Museum has been recognized for its avant-garde and forward-thinking approach to modern and contemporary art. Its mission statement says that the museum "fosters community, experimentation, and new knowledge through direct engagement with modern and contemporary art, artists, and ideas".

== Architecture ==
The Rose Art Museum is a small and simple geometric structure designed by the firm Harrison & Abramovitz, known for its design of the Headquarters of the United Nations in New York City. The initial 1961 design contained 12,000 square feet (1,100 m^{2}) of exhibition space, a modest size. The original building had no freight elevator, and the doors were too small for large works of art. The collection soon outgrew the building, so Harrison & Abramovitz designed an expansion, completed in April 1974 at a cost of $500,000.

In the late 1990s, the galleries were renovated. In 2011, the architectural firm Bruner Cott completed a $1.7 million "light touch renovation", refreshing and restoring surfaces and updating mechanical systems, in time for the 50th anniversary celebrations. As of 2022, the museum has approximately 13,000 square feet (1,200 m^{2}) of exhibition space in three major galleries.

In front of the museum stands Light of Reason by Chris Burden. The environmental sculpture, commissioned by the university and installed in 2014, consists of three rows of 24 Victorian lamp posts which fan out around the museum's entrance. The sculpture serves as a gateway and outdoor event space, and has become a campus landmark.

== History ==
The museum's exhibition and cultural programming have come to be centered on leading contemporary artists, often giving these artists their first group or solo museum exhibitions: Frank Stella, Kiki Smith, Nam June Paik, and Dana Schutz among them. The Rose Art Museum has a leading collection of modern and contemporary art in New England.

=== Origin and early years ===
Before Brandeis graduated its first class in 1951, the university had already in its possession more than 300 paintings, including works by Stuart Davis, Fernand Léger, Milton Avery, and George Grosz.

Sam Hunter, the first director of the Rose Art Museum, came to Brandeis from the Museum of Modern Art. In 1961, with a grant of $50,000 from collectors Leon Mnuchin and his wife, Harriet Gevirtz-Mnuchin, he launched a collection with iconic works by Johns, Rauschenberg, Warhol, Willem de Kooning, and several others, a total of 21 works with a ceiling of $5,000 for any one piece bought using the grant.

The New York Times took notice of important exhibitions at the museum, praising an "eminently worthwhile" David von Schlegell retrospective in 1968; calling a 1969 exhibit of sculpture by James Rosatti "an event of some importance"; and devoting a full-length article to a 1981 Helen Frankenthaler exhibition.

In 1970, the museum presented to the public Vision & Television, the first video art exhibition in the United States.

In 1971, the Rose Art Museum received a major influx of artworks from the former Riverside Museum in the Upper West Side of Manhattan, New York City. These acquisitions were designated as the "Louis and Nettie Horch Collection", or the "Riverside Museum Collection".

In 1989, the Rose trustees and staff formally redefined the mission of the museum as focussed on contemporary art.

=== Sale of works from the collection (1991) ===
In 1991, Brandeis announced a plan to sell fourteen works of art from the Rose, including three by Renoir, two by Daumier, two by Vuillard, and one by Toulouse-Lautrec. The announcement drew sharp criticism. Arnold L. Lehman, President of the Association of Art Museum Directors called it "like selling one of your children to feed the others", and the Association issued an official criticism of the plan. Mary Gardner Neill of the Yale University Art Gallery said "We still oppose what they're doing, because it's wrong to convert collections into cash.... If a museum sells art, the proceeds must go to replenish the collection with other works of art."

Nevertheless, on November 6, 1991, eleven works were auctioned off at Christie's, bringing in $3.65 million which Brandeis said would be used for "an endowment that will pay for acquisitions, education and conservation".

=== Plans for closure (2009-2011) ===
On January 26, 2009, Brandeis president Jehuda Reinharz announced in an email to staff and students plans to close the museum by the end of the summer in response to the 2008 financial crisis. University spokesman Dennis Nealon called the surprise announcement a "hard decision", but said, "The bottom line is that the students, the faculty and core academic mission come first. Trustees had to look at the college's assets and came to a decision to maintain that fundamental commitment to teaching." The proposal was quickly criticized by the museum's director and board, numerous art-world figures, and some donors to the museum.

The Massachusetts Attorney General's office has approval powers over certain actions of nonprofit institutions located in the state, and Attorney General Martha Coakley said she planned to conduct a detailed review of the decision relative to wills and agreements made with donors. Nealon claimed that the attorney general had "approved the legality of closing the Rose and selling its art", but the attorney general's office claimed they were only informed about the decision, not consulted beforehand. An early estimate of the total value of the collection was in the $350–400 million range, though values may have been less due to a flagging art market. The university's endowment was $700 million before being hit by the drop in financial markets. Several of the university's large donors were reportedly particularly hard hit due to investment losses with Bernard Madoff.

On March 16, 2009, it was reported that members of the founding donors' family had publicly denounced the closure plans, calling it a "plundering" of the collection.

The Association of College and University Museums and Galleries (ACUMG) published a statement specifically opposing the Rose Art Museum closure and sale of its collection. In April 2009, an ongoing Task Force for the Protection of University Collections was organized by members of multiple museum professional organizations, to oppose the liquidation of university museums and galleries, and to provide professional resources for support of these threatened institutions.

On July 27, 2009, three of the museum's overseers filed a lawsuit in Massachusetts to halt the closing and sale of works. The three, including a member of the Rose family, contended that the planned closing contradicted the museum's "charitable intentions", violated the trust of those who donated art to the institution, and reneged on "Brandeis's promises that the Rose would be maintained in perpetuity".

Ironically, a major new book was to be published in October 2009 by Abrams Books, anticipating the upcoming 50th anniversary of the Rose Art Museum. The lead contributor to the book was the museum's director, Michael Rush, who initially was "shell-shocked" by the surprise closure announcement. He ruefully noted that the number of visitors to the museum had markedly increased, due to the growing controversy.

Rush helped to organize opposition to the proposed closing, but his employment contract with Brandeis was not renewed in June 2009, effectively forcing him out. In December 2010, Rush secured a position as founding director of the new Eli and Edythe Broad Art Museum at Michigan State University.

The fate of the Rose Art Museum remained in contention, but a final resolution was slow in coming. The museum continued operations, but did little to initiate new programs in the absence of a permanent director.

By June 30, 2011, under the new leadership of Brandeis president Frederick M. Lawrence, the lawsuit that had been brought against the university to prevent the closing of the Rose was settled. The museum had remained open, and no works of art were sold to support university operations. In addition, the museum initiated programs to attract and involve more current Brandeis students in the operations of the museum, and to use its resources in their academic coursework.

The controversy was chronicled in a 2012 book by Francine Koslow Miller: Cashing in on Culture: Betraying the Trust at the Rose Art Museum.

=== October 2011 reopening ===
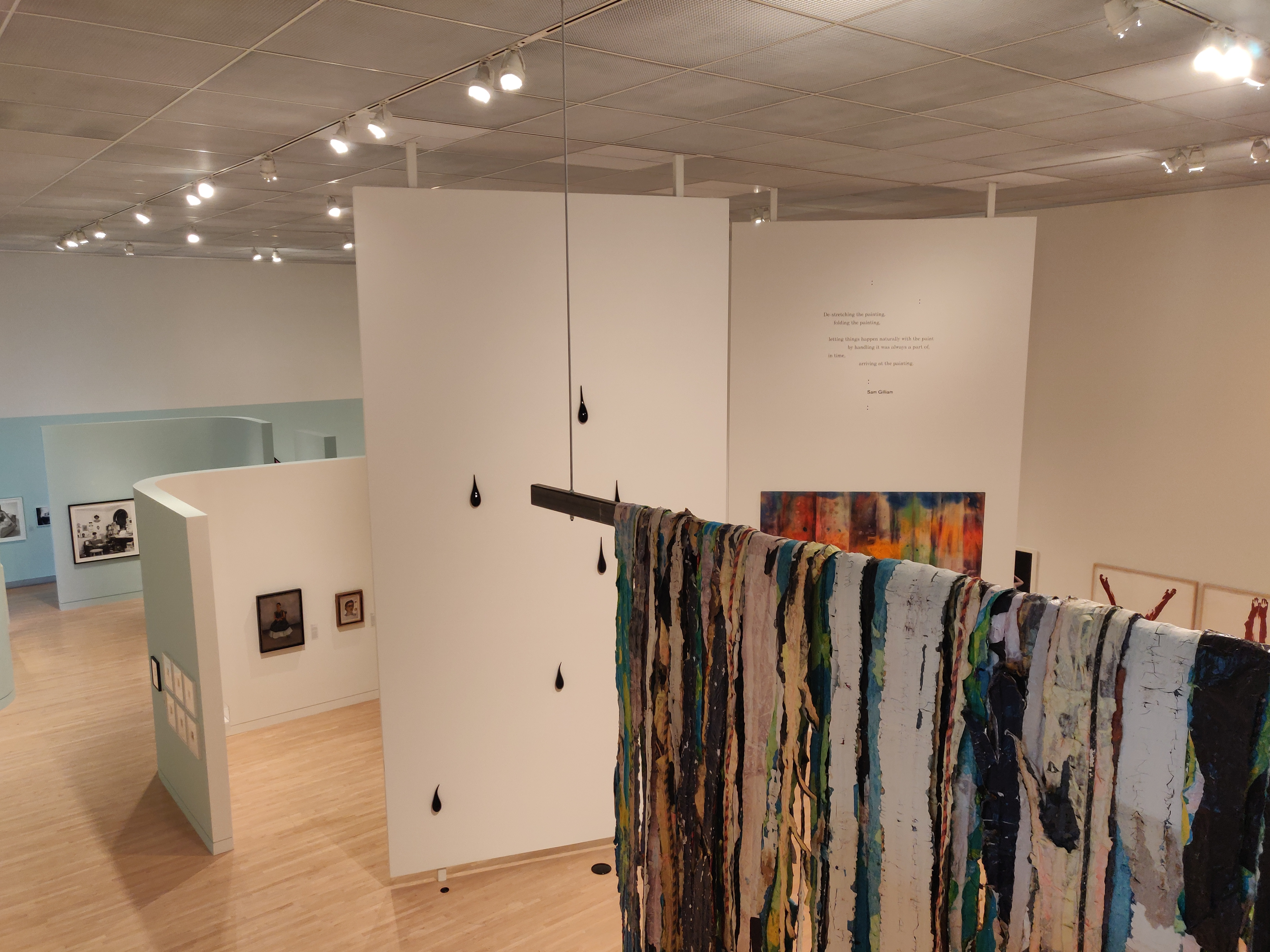
Largest of three main exhibition galleries (2022)

After a brief closing period to undergo major renovations costing $1.7 million, the Rose Art Museum reopened October 25, 2011. This coincided with the 50th anniversary of the museum, which was also celebrated with ceremonies including speeches by the university president Frederick M. Lawrence, and the artist James Rosenquist.

In 2016, the Rose Art Museum joined with five other university and college arts museums to create the New Media Arts Consortium. This group was formed to jointly acquire and share digital, interactive, and new media works.

=== Post COVID-19 reopening ===
In June 2020, Brandeis University named renowned Israeli art historian and author Gannit Ankori as the interim Director and Chief Curator of the museum, and permanently confirmed these appointments in December. Ankori succeeded former Rose director Luis Croquer, who had left the museum in June 2020.

After its mandatory emergency closing in March 2020 due to the COVID-19 pandemic, the Rose Art Museum reopened exclusively to Brandeis University students, faculty, and staff in September 2020. The museum was one of the first Boston-area university art galleries to re-open to the public, on June 25, 2021.

In celebration of the reopening and the museum's 60th anniversary, the Rose presented re:collections, a three-year-long rotating retrospective of the museum's collection. The exhibition placed less-known (and often excluded and marginalized artists) in juxtaposition to famous art figures to bring new voices and correct art history's exclusionary practices.

== Collections ==
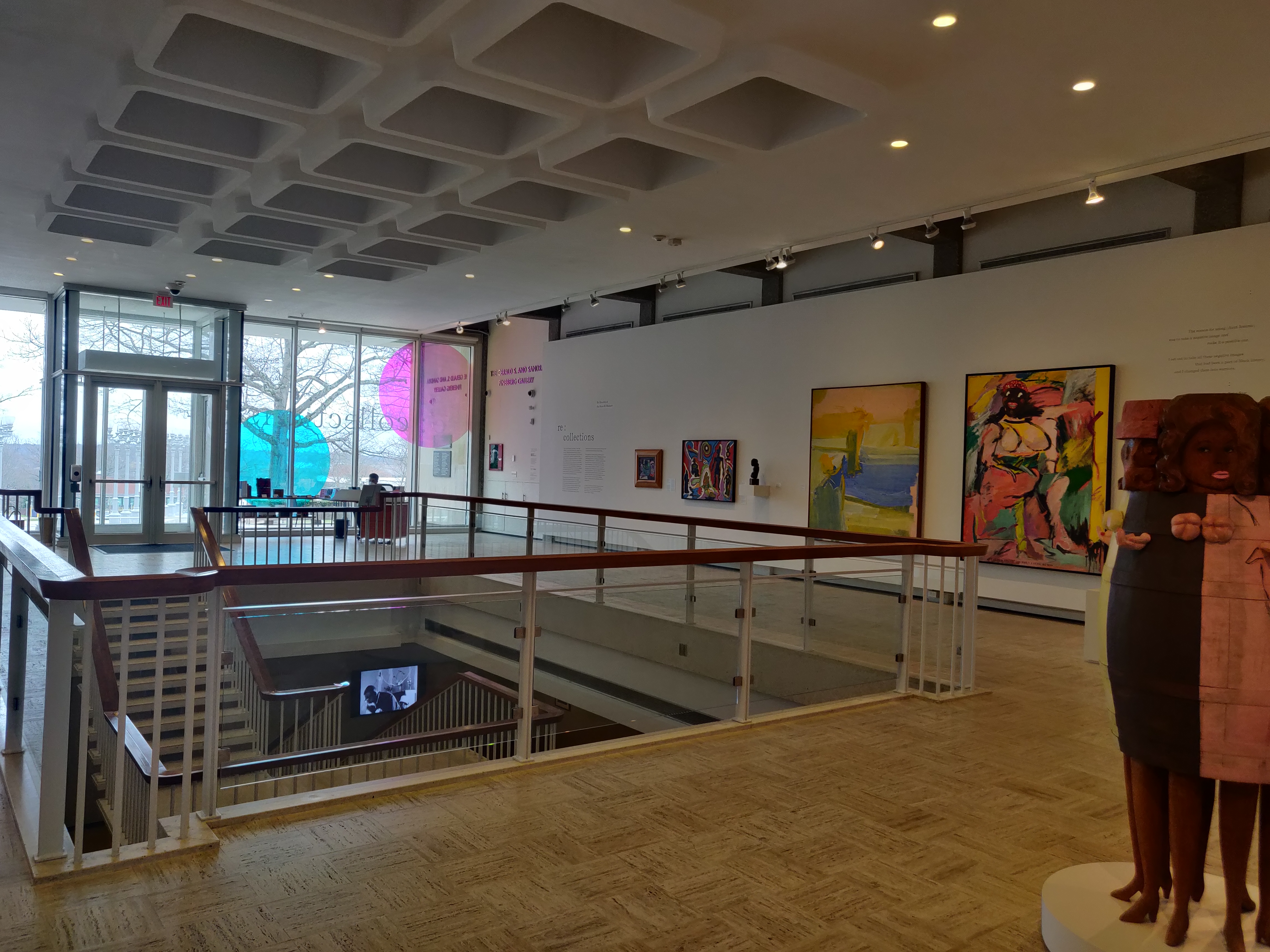
Interior view of gallery at entrance (2022)

The museum's collection includes more than 9,000 objects, including works by such artists as Mark Bradford, Judy Chicago, Cindy Sherman, Helen Frankenthaler, Paul Gauguin, Nan Goldin, William Kentridge, Yayoi Kusama, Henri Matisse, Mona Hatoum, Jasper Johns, Ellsworth Kelly, Willem de Kooning, Roy Lichtenstein, Marisol Escobar, Robert Motherwell, Robert Rauschenberg, Andrés Serrano, Jack Whitten, Yoko Ono, Pablo Picasso, Henri de Toulouse-Lautrec, and Andy Warhol.

The permanent collection has particular strength in post-war American art and international contemporary art, including Abstract Expressionism, Pop Art, Minimalism, Conceptual Art, and Feminist Art. Temporary exhibitions are often coordinated with selections from the permanent collection, or to set new artworks in dialog with earlier works in the collection.

=== Digital collection ===
In 2014 the Rose Art Museum launched a digital archive of its extensive modern and contemporary art collection. The initiative was supported by the Jasmine Charity Trust in memory of Regina Jaglom Wachter and the Institute of Museum and Library Services. The Rose Art Museum's Digital Collection features an expanding catalogue of artists, acquisitions, and current and past exhibitions.

=== The Undisciplined Collector ===
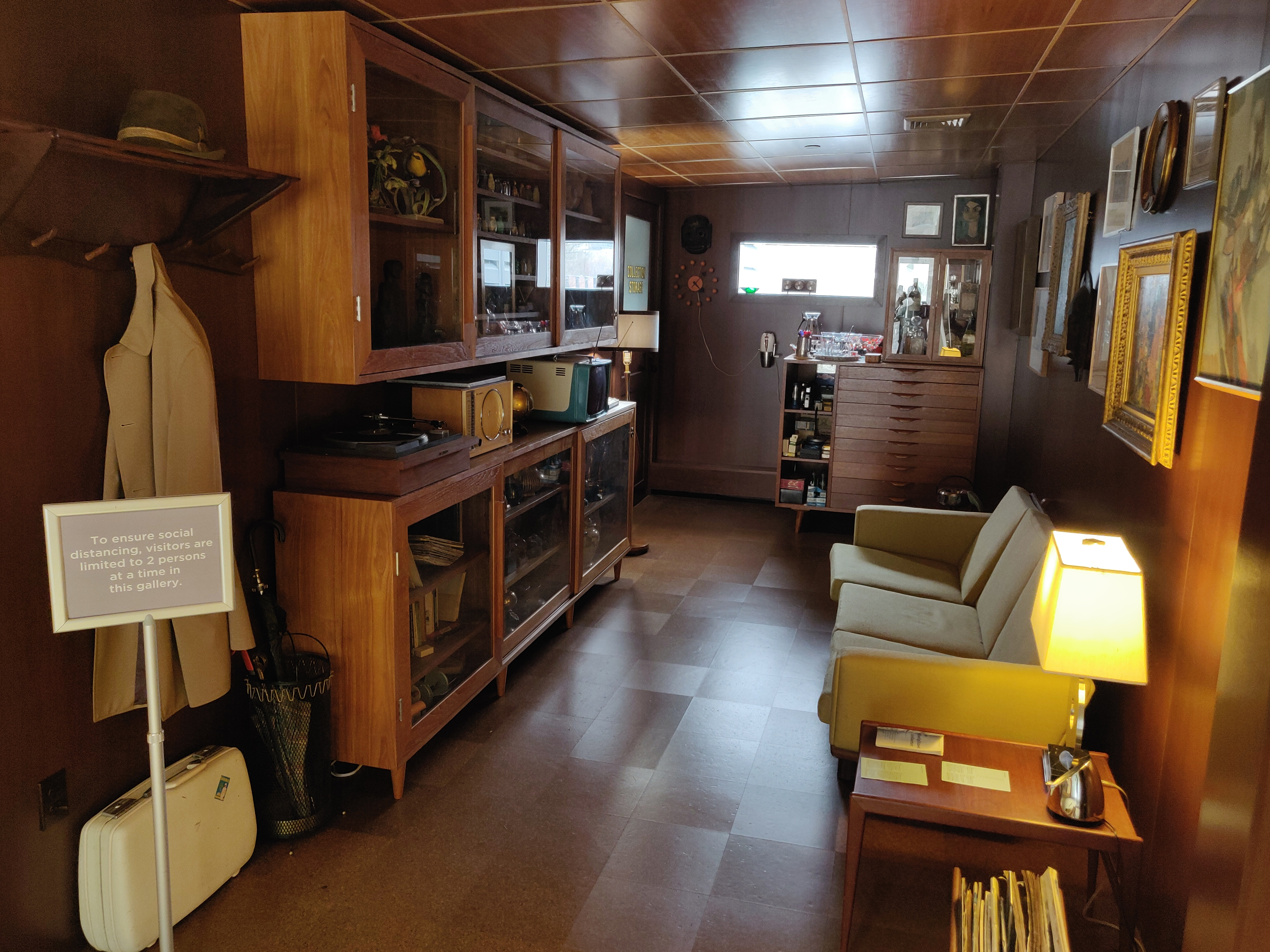
This permanent installation by Mark Dion may be entered by visitors

In 2015, conceptual artist Mark Dion completed his permanent installation, The Undisciplined Collector, in a small ground-floor gallery inside the Rose Art Museum. The room-sized space is a recreation of a 1961-style residential "den", a wunderkammer or time capsule filled with authentic period artifacts gleaned from various Brandeis University collections. The year 1961 was the birth year of both the artist and the museum, and some of the exhibits reflect news coverage of the latter's debut. The collections on view include vintage record albums and magazines, cocktail swizzle sticks, Chinese snuff bottles, small sculptures, and other minor artworks, trophies, and souvenirs which were available in that year.

Visitors may enter the installation to examine the artifacts at close range, and to relax on the retro-replica sofa while reading. The furnishings were custom-built to the artist's specifications, and reflect the Mid-century modern style of the time. A small passport-sized 40-page booklet narrates the history of the Rose Art Museum, and the sourcing of some of the artifacts on view. A set of three blue insert sheets catalogs many of the artworks and other items on display; copies of the booklet can be purchased for $5 from an attendant at the entry to the museum.

== Programming ==
The Rose Art Museum offers 9-12 exhibitions a year, most of which are organized by the museum's own curatorial team. Admission is always free to everyone, and most tours, lectures, artist appearances, and gallery openings are open to all.

Activities at the museum are often coordinated or integrated with other on-campus academic programs, affording students opportunities to participate as visitors, museum docents, or interns.

== Notable exhibitions ==
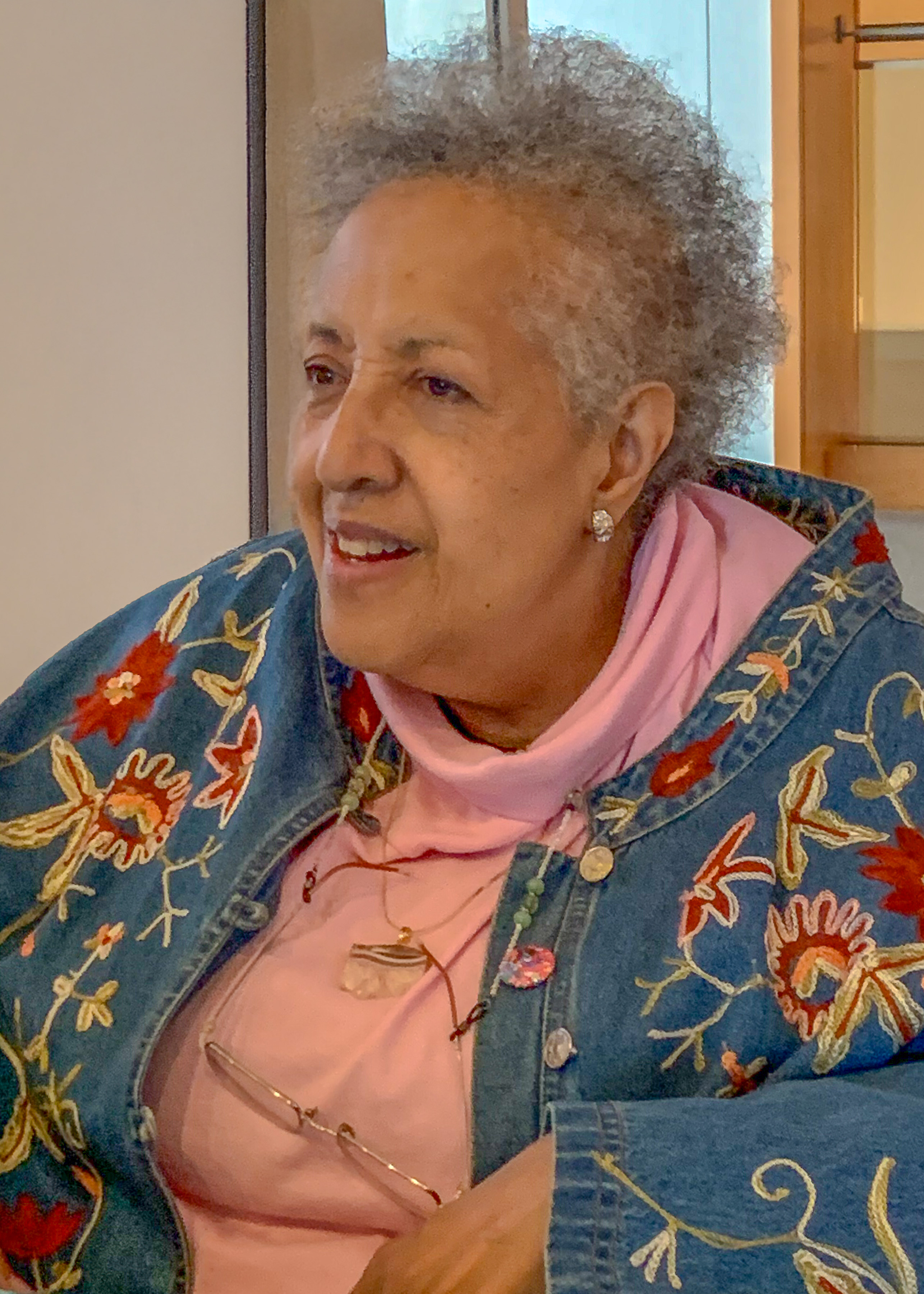
Artist Howardena Pindell attends the Feb 2019 opening of What Remains to Be Seen

- A Century of Modern European Painting, opening exhibition, June 3 – September 15, 1961
- Vision & Television, first video art exhibition in the United States, January 21 – February 23, 1970
- Vasily Kandinsky, May 1 - June 7, 1974
- More Than Minimal: Feminism and Abstraction in the '70s, April 21 - June 30, 1996
- Pretty Raw: After and Around Helen Frankenthaler, February 11 - June 7, 2015

== Directors ==
- Sam Hunter (1961–1965)
- William C. Seitz (1965–1971)
- Russell Connor (1971)
- Michael Wentworth (1971–1974)
- Carl Belz (1974–1998)
- Joshep D. Ketner (1998–2006)
- Michael Rush (2006–2009)
- Christopher Bedford (2012–2017)
- Luis Croquer (2017–2020)
- Gannit Ankori (2020–present)

== See also ==
- Deaccessioning (museum)
- Effects of the Great Recession on museums
