= Kate Gilmore (artist) =

American artist

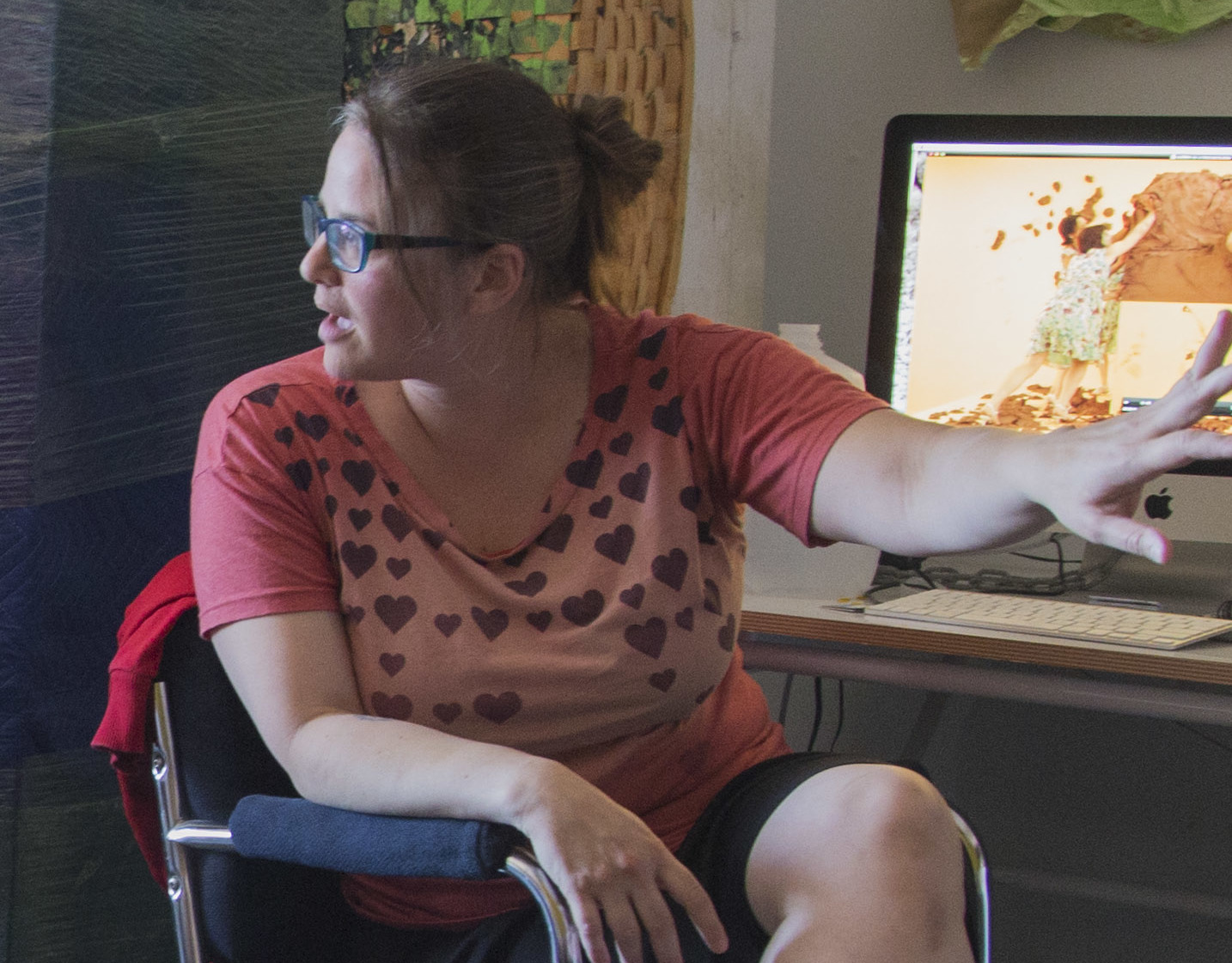
Kate Gilmore in 2014

Kate Gilmore (born 1975) is an American artist working in including video, sculpture, photography, and performance. Gilmore's work engages with ideas of femininity through her own physicality and critiques of gender and sex. Gilmore lives and works in New York City, NY and is Associate Professor of Art+Design at SUNY Purchase. Gilmore has exhibited at the 2010 Whitney Biennial, the Brooklyn Museum, The Indianapolis Museum of Art, White Columns; Contemporary Arts Center (Cincinnati), Artpace, The J. Paul Getty Museum, The Rose Art Museum, and PS1/MoMA Contemporary Art Center.

== Early life and education ==
Born in Washington, D.C., Gilmore attended Bates College in Lewiston, Maine, graduating in 1997. Gilmore received her masters of fine arts in 2002 from the School of Visual Arts in New York

== Work ==
Gilmore's work explores female identity, struggle, and displacement; being the protagonist in her video work, Gilmore "attempts to conquer self-constructed obstacles." Challenging herself by engaging in and performing physically demanding actions, Gilmore exaggerates the absurdity of these actions by frequently dressing in overtly feminine attire such as floral-print skirts and colorful high heels. Described as messy and chaotic, Gilmore's work gives a contemporary revision on feminine and hardcore performances that started in the 1960s and 1970s with artists like Marina Abramović and Chris Burden.

Although she has a background in sculpture, Gilmore shifted to a focus on performance after noticing that visitors to her studio were as interested in her personal life and belongings as much as in her art. Gilmore current works are largely video pieces and live performances that often showcase herself, though her work as a sculptor is often evident. In Gilmore's videos, she "re-imagines female agency in the post-postmodern world. Starting in 2004, Gilmore's video piece entitled My Love is an Anchor showcases the artist herself beating on a cement filled bucket with her leg stuck inside; hearing her grunts and groans and she attempts to escape, the video ends with no real footage of the artist escaping. Her filmography is integral to her works. In videos including Between a Hard Place (2008), Main Squeeze (2006), and Every Girl Loves Pink (2006), the videos are shot very near the subject, highlighting the restricting claustrophobic nature of the performance environment. The installation "Hopelessly Devoted" (2006) at Brooklyn's Pierogi, the camera is positioned in such a way that infuses the videos with the qualities of a home video or documentary, adding the raw emotion of the work.

In some pieces, Gilmore casts other women to perform the acts, such as her piece Walk The Walk, which is also Gilmore's first public performance piece. In Walk the Walk, Gilmore charges sets of seven identically dressed women to constantly move around an eight foot square cube positioned, as on a pedestal, eight feet above the ground in a test of endurance. In the work, Gilmore raises the uniform women and their tedious yet essential actions to a position that viewers "literally look up to."

In the series of exhibits STEP UP at Real Art Ways (2005) with Jonathan Grassi and Joo-Mee Paik, Gilmore again is the sole protagonist in performances in which she engages in wordplay, acting out common expressions such as "Double Dutch" and "Heart Breaker."

Her performance piece "Beat" (2017) at the On Stellar Rays gallery in New York with fellow artist Karen Heagle, featured waist-high, red enameled, metal cubes distributed throughout the gallery space. These cubes became props for weekend performances, featuring Gilmore and other female performers, who "stomp, kick and pound on the Minimalist boxes with a slow, steady rhythm, so oppressively loud that it fills the gallery with an echoing beat of warning and feminist-tinged rage."

Due to her unrelenting nature with her work, Gilmore's pieces make the viewer feel as though she's accepted a ridiculous dare. Her performances and videos of them are reminiscent of "Freudian processings", and suggest a naive girl who always wears her delicate dress and high heeled shoes, even when facing twisted situations, effectively conjuring "metaphors that recall the theater of the absurd."

== Residencies and awards ==
- 2010
  - Lower Manhattan Cultural Council Award for Artistic Excellence, New York, New York
- 2009
  - Louis Comfort Tiffany Foundation Award, New York, New York

== See also ==
- Inside the Artist's Studio, Princeton Architectural Press, 2015. (ISBN 978-1616893040)
- http://www.kategilmore.com/
