= Michael Rush (museum director) =

American ordained priest, actor and art museum director

Michael Rush (1949 – March 27, 2015) was an American ordained priest, actor, and art museum director.

Rush had doctorates in theology and psychology from Harvard University. He originally was an ordained Jesuit priest, but became an actor in the 1980s. He founded an experimental theater, and also landed minor roles in the Spenser: For Hire and Law & Order television series. He wrote art criticism for the New Haven Register, as well as books on video art and new media. He was the only director of the Palm Beach Institute of Contemporary Art (2000-2005) during its brief existence, in Palm Beach, Florida.

In 2006, Rush was appointed the Henry and Lois Foster Director of the Rose Art Museum at Brandeis University in Waltham, Massachusetts. In January 2009, Rush was at first "shell-shocked" by the surprise announcement of plans to permanently close the Rose Art Museum and sell off its collection, but he soon organized some of the initial opposition to the scheme. His employment contract with Brandeis was not renewed in June 2009, effectively forcing him to leave. Ironically, he had been principal contributor to a substantial book commemorating the 50th anniversary of the Rose Art Museum and featuring its collection, which was published by Abrams Books in late 2009.

In December 2010, Rush secured a position as founding director of the new Eli and Edythe Broad Art Museum at Michigan State University, a position he held until his death from pancreatic cancer on March 27, 2015, at the age of 65.
