= Doreen Garner =

American artist (born 1986)

- Born: 1986 (age 39–40); Philadelphia, Pennsylvania
- Education: Temple University, Rhode Island School of Design
- Occupations: Artist, Sculptor
- Website: www.doreengarner.com

Doreen Garner (born 1986) is an American sculptor and performance artist. Her art practice explores where history, power, and violence meet on the body via beauty or medicine. Garner has exhibited at a number of venues, including New Museum, Abrons Arts Center, Pioneer Works, Socrates Sculpture Park, The National Museum of African American History in Washington, D.C., Museum of Contemporary African Diasporan Art in Brooklyn, and Chrysler Museum of Art in Norfolk, Virginia. Garner holds a monthly podcast called #trashDAY with artist Kenya (Robinson). Garner lives and works in Brooklyn, New York.

== Early life and education ==
Garner was born in Philadelphia, Pennsylvania, in 1986. She graduated from Tyler School of Art at Temple University and received an MFA at the Rhode Island School of Design.

== Work ==
Garner moved to New York in 2014 after she graduated from Rhode Island School of Design. She attended the Skowhegan School for Painting and Sculpture. Garner's body of work includes, "corporeal, gushy, colorful, complex sculptures that incorporate braiding hair, silicone, Vaseline, condoms, and various other manipulated and found materials to create medically and historically informed expressions of black-female physicality".

The following year, Garner was an artist-in-residence at the Henry Street Settlement in downtown Manhattan.

=== Sculptures ===
In 2016, Garner held two simultaneous solo-exhibitions in New York. At Essex Flowers, Removing the Veil: Vanity as Material for Incision, the artist exhibited several sculptures that addressed beauty practices and the body. The sculptural works on view mimic flesh using silicone, and included a hairy mass with Swarovski crystals, pearls, hair weaves, and more suspended in a cage, and a portrait of a woman torn from a magazine situated in a dissection tray. In Wave Hill, Garner exhibited Flora: Viscera, an exhibition of works that resembled botched surgeries. Garner was also featured in a group show curated by New York artist Derrick Adams at Volta Art Fair in New York.

In early 2017, ARTnews announced Garner as one of the artists selected for the Socrates Annual, previously known as the Emerging Artist Fellowship Exhibition, at Socrates Sculpture Park. During the summer of 2017, Garner held a solo-exhibition titled, Doctor's Hours, at Larrie gallery. The show exhibited several sculptural works, a number of drawings, and a library containing selected books that inspired the exhibition, such as In the Flesh: The Cultural Politics of Body Modification by Victoria Pitts-Taylor and The Immortal Life of Henrietta Lacks by Rebecca Skloot.

Garner curated her first New York show the same summer. Titled Stranger Things, the group-exhibition at Outpost Artists Resources explored various themes of, "intimacy, hygiene, latent sexuality, and racialized violence" as noted by Vanessa Thrill at Artforum. Artists in the show included Jes Fan, Kenya (Robinson), Tamara Santibañez, Erik Ferguson, Nakeya Brown, Ted Mineo, and Elliott Jerome Brown Jr.

In the fall of 2017, Garner held a two-person exhibition at Pioneer Works, titled White Man on A Pedestal, with Kenya (Robinson). The large-scale exhibition included new sculptural works, including a large-sized 3-D rendered J. Marion Sims all in red and a number of fleshy works hanging as meat racks, gynecological tools, and an army of men by (Robinson). The exhibition began with a performance by (Robinson), titled #WHITEMANINMYPOCKET, and ended with a performance by Garner, titled Purge. The exhibition interrogated the legacy of Sims, known colloquially as the "Father of Modern Gynecology", who has fallen largely out of favor in the medical community for his brutal mistreatment and experimentation on black female bodies. Writer and critic William J. Simmons wrote in Cultured Magazine that the show, "follows that Garner's work is as historically informed as it is visually arresting," and that "there is a wealth of research and documentation that takes her imagery out of the realm of shock and into a deeper appeal".

In the spring of 2019, Garner created a showcase entitled She is Risen. This showcase was held at JTT in New York. It featured several sculptures, one of which honored Betsy Ross and Betsey titled, "Betsey's Flag." The sculpture is a flag shape in which one side features a flag to look like the original made by Betsy Ross, and the other side features flesh, blood, fat cells, and muscle tissue. The 16 stars on the flag were to represent the amount of cots within the lab of J. Marion Sims instead of the 16 states. Another piece, entitled, "Henrietta: After the Harvest" was in honor of Henrietta Lacks, which depicted a cervix which had undergone radiation treatment and also contained black bands to represent the radiation tubes placed within the piece.

To follow She is Risen, Garner released a continuation showcase entitled, The Remains, which was located at JTT in the winter of 2020. The pieces entitled, "After Her Womb," "After Her Flag," and "After Her Tomb," are all related to the pieces in the She is Risen collection regarding Betsey and Anarcha, who were women that were unjustly experimented on while enslaved. The piece, "After Her Harvest," refers to the piece, "Henrietta: After the Harvest," about Henrietta Lacks and the cancer cells that were taken from her without her consent. All four of these pieces showcase the flesh from the experimentation of black women.

=== Tattoos ===
In winter of 2018, Garner held a pop-up tattoo parlor every Friday and Saturday through March 3, 2018 entitled, Invisible Man Tattoo. It was located in Recess in Clinton Hill, Brooklyn. There, she allowed people to either pick from her designated designs, or create their own. These created tattoos were anywhere from cotton flowers to Martin Luther King Jr. and black panther heads. Additionally, anyone who identified as a brown or black person of color would receive a free tattoo from a selected list. The purpose of this pop-up tattoo parlor was to address tattoo culture, which tended to eliminate black history, and to create a space in which people of color would feel welcome.

=== Podcast ===
#trashDAY is a podcast run by Garner and Kenya (Robinson). Their podcast offers a wide range of ideas, anywhere from strategies to help oneself, to intensive critique. The podcast appears on Clocktower Radio and the purpose of this podcast is to be a starting point for social commentary displayed in a bit of mockery or sarcasm.

== Exhibitions ==
Solo exhibitions

- Revolted, New Museum, New York, 2022
- The Remains, JTT, New York, NY, 2020
- Doreen Garner, CAPRI, Düsseldorf, DE, 2019
- She is Risen, JTT, New York, NY, 2019
- Doreen Garner: Alternative Modes of Penetration, MoMA PS1, Long Island City, NY (performance), 2019
- Statements, Art Basel, Basel, CH, 2018
- Doctor's Hours, Larrie, New York, NY, 2017
- Doreen Garner: Full Body, George Mason University, Washington, D.C., 2017
- Ether and Agony, Antenna Gallery, New Orleans, LA, 2016
- Removing The Veil: Vanity as Material for Incision, Essex Flowers, New York, NY, 2016
- Flora: Viscera, Wavehill, Bronx, NY 2016
- Shiny / Red / Pumping, Vox Populi Gallery, Philadelphia, PA, 2015
- Abjection, Bannister Gallery, Providence, RI, 2014

Selected two-person exhibitions

- White Man on a Pedestal with Kenya (Robinson), Pioneer Works, Brooklyn, NY, 2017
- Surrogate Skin: The Biology of Objects with Keisha Scarville, Museum of Contemporary African Diasporan Art, Brooklyn, NY, 2016

Selected group exhibitions

- The Hela Project, The National Museum of African American History, Washington, D.C., 2017
- Emerging Artist Exhibition, Socrates Sculpture Park, Queens, NY, 2017
- Stranger Things, Outpost Gallery, Queens, NY, 2017
- Sexual Fragments Absent, Paddles, New York, NY 2017
- Something I Can Feel, curated by Derrick Adams, Volta Art Fair, New York, NY 2016
- Subject to Capital, Abrons Art Center, New York, NY 2016
- Young and Loving, S12 Gallery, Bergen, Norway, 2015
- Pussy Don't Fail Me Now, Cindy Rucker Gallery, New York, NY, 2015
- Girl Bye, Rush Arts Gallery, New York, NY, 2014
- It Doesn't Show Signs of Stopping, AS220 Project Gallery, Providence, RI, 2014

== Awards and recognition ==
Garner has received the Toby Devan Lewis Award (2014), The Wood Institute Fellowship Research Grant (2013), the Presidential Scholarship Award (2012), and the Creative Research Fellowship Grant (2010).
