= Santibanez =

Santibáñez or Santibanez is a surname. Notable people with the surname include:

- Jorge Santibáñez Ceardi (1934–2020), Chilean politician and lawyer
- Bárbara Santibáñez (born 1996), Chilean footballer
- Carlos Santibáñez (born 1986), Argentine football midfielder
- Edwin Santibáñez (born 1980), Mexican retired footballer
- Emanuelle Silva Santibanez, Chilean road skater
- Ignacio Santibáñez (1512–1598), the first Roman Catholic Archbishop of Manila
- Joaquín Santibáñez (born 1952), Mexican former Olympic swimmer
- José Daniel Santibáñez (born 1959), Ecuadorian science fiction novelist and comic book writer
- Katia Santibañez (born 1964), French-American multidisciplinary abstract artist
- Luis Santibáñez (1936–2008), Chilean football manager
- Mario Santibáñez (born 1950), Mexican Olympic swimmer
- Marisela Santibáñez (born 1975), Chilean actress, presenter, politician of the Communist Party
- Rogelio Hernández Santibáñez (born 1934), Spanish racing cyclist
- Tamara Santibañez (born 1987), American visual artist, and tattoo artist
- Francisco Gómez de Quevedo y Santibáñez Villegas, Knight of the Order of Santiago (1580–1645), Spanish nobleman, politician, writer

== See also ==
- Estadio Municipal Roberto Bravo Santibáñez, multi-use stadium in Melipilla, Chile
- Santi Ibáñez
