= Museum of Contemporary Art Jacksonville =

Museum in Florida, US

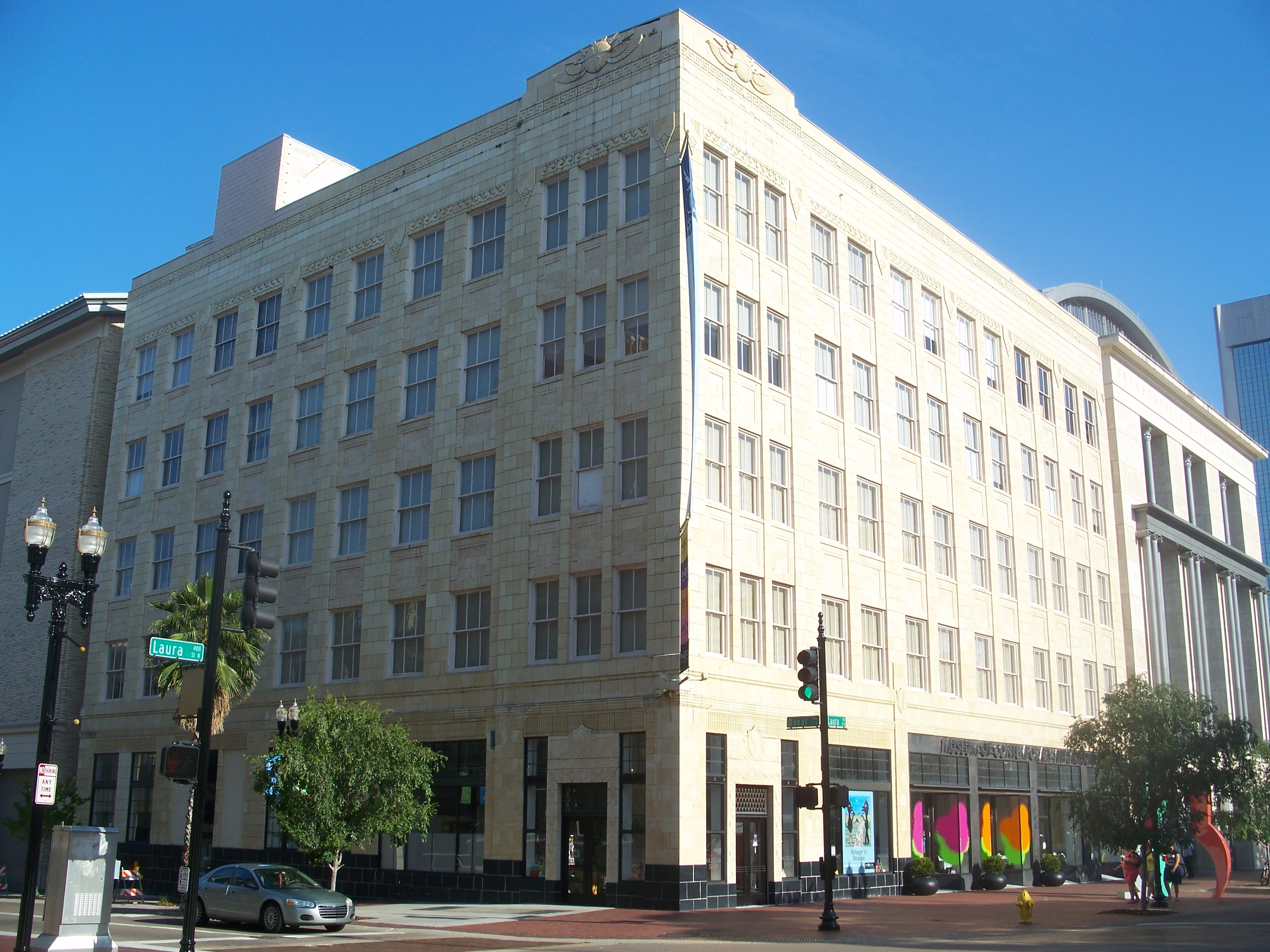

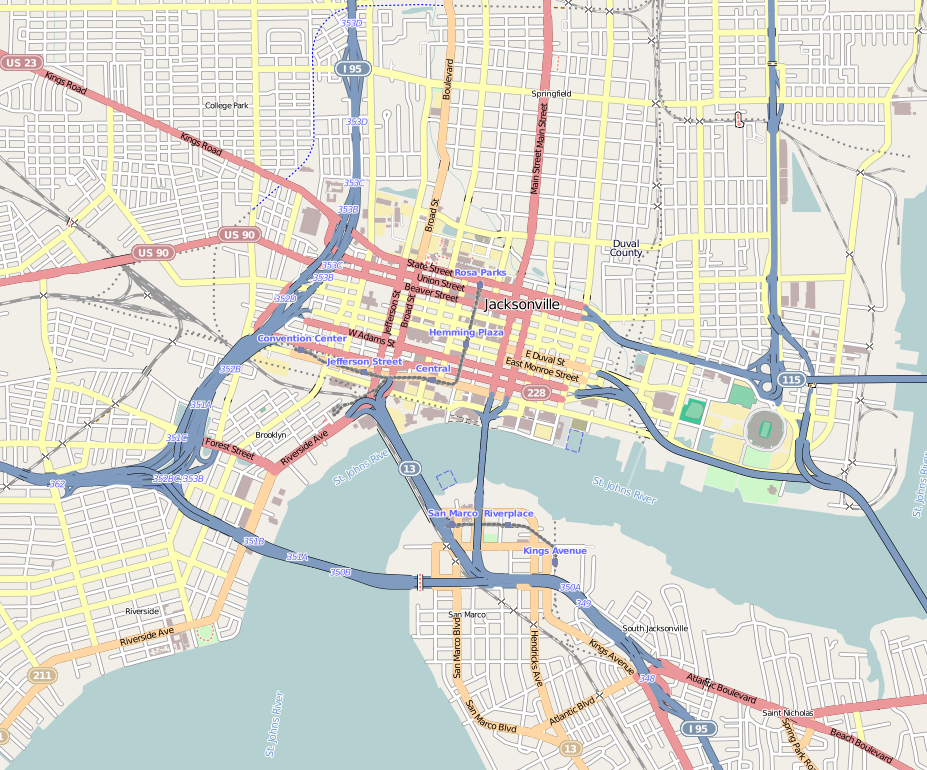
- Location within Central Jacksonville Location within Florida
- Established: 1924
- Location: 333 North Laura Street; Jacksonville, FL 32202
- Coordinates: 30.329319°N 81.658649°W
- Type: Art museum
- Director: Caitlin Doherty
- Curator: Ylva Rouse
- Public transit access: Bus: Riverside Trolly; Monorail: James Weldon Johnson Park Station
- Website: mocajacksonville.unf.edu
- Building details
- Former names: Western Union Telegraph Building

General information
- Architectural style: Art Deco
- Completed: 1931
- Owner: University of North Florida

Design and construction
- Architect: Marsh and Saxelbye
- Developer: Western Union Telegraph Company

The Museum of Contemporary Art Jacksonville, also known as MOCA Jacksonville, is a contemporary art museum in Jacksonville, Florida, funded and operated as a "cultural institute" of the University of North Florida. One of the largest contemporary art institutions in the Southeastern United States, it presents exhibitions by international, national and regional artists.

== History ==
MOCA Jacksonville was founded in 1924 as the Jacksonville Fine Arts Society, the first organization in the Jacksonville community devoted to the visual arts. In 1948 the museum was incorporated as the Jacksonville Art Museum, and in 1978 it became the first institution in Jacksonville to be accredited by the American Alliance of Museums.

In late 1999, the museum acquired its permanent home, the historic Western Union Telegraph Building on Hemming Plaza (now James Weldon Johnson Park), built by The Auchter Company, adjacent to the newly renovated City Hall, and became the Jacksonville Museum of Modern Art (JMOMA). In 2000, a series of preview exhibitions opened in a temporary exhibition space while the building facade was restored to its original Art Deco style. The interior was completely refurbished to house the museum's galleries, educational facilities, a theater/auditorium, Museum Shop and Café Nola. Total renovation of the 60,000-square-foot (5,600 m^{2}), six-floor facility was completed in 2003, culminating in a grand re-opening in May of that year.

== Growth ==
After moving to its downtown location the museum experienced rapid growth in both membership and the size of the permanent collection. The many substantial additions to the collection increased not only its quality, but also its size to almost 800 pieces. In November 2006, JMOMA became the Museum of Contemporary Art Jacksonville.

The museum continues to be a cornerstone of Jacksonville's multibillion-dollar downtown revitalization plan. Its exhibitions and programming bring new visitors to the civic core during the day, at night and on weekends. Educational programming includes children's literacy initiatives and weekend art making classes as well as regular tours, lectures, films and publications for children and adults.

MOCA Jacksonville's changing exhibitions feature the works of contemporary artists working in a wide assortment of media from painting, sculpture, and video. The third floor hosts exhibitions, which rotate approximately every four months.

The University of North Florida acquired the museum in 2009 to act as a cultural resource of the university.

== Past exhibitions ==
=== 2022 ===
- State of the Art: Locate January 21 – May 1, 2022
- Anderson Goncalves: Cultural Polarity January 8 – May 8, 2022
- Project Atrium: Chiharu Shiota: Letters of Love February 4 – June 26, 2022
- Creeks Rising: A City Reflected in Hogans & McCoys Creeks May 6 – June 30, 2022
- Jessica Hische: Covered February 25 – August 21, 2022
- Express Your UNF Pride May 13 – August 28, 2022
- Kara Walker: Cut To The Quick: From the Collections of Jordan D. Schnitzer and his Family Foundation May 20 – October 2, 2022
- Project Atrium: Maud Cotter: What Was Never Ours To Keep July 9 – November 20, 2022
- Urban Spaces: UNF Photography Student Exhibition December 2, 2022 – January 8, 2023
- Art With a Heart in Healthcare: What Lifts You Up September 11, 2022 – January 8, 2023
- Art + Politics: Grounding Dialogue December 14, 2022 – February 5, 2023
- Fifty: An Alumni Exhibition March 25, 2022 – February 12, 2023
- Shervone Neckles: Bless This House September 3, 2022 – March 5, 2023
- Project Atrium: Milagros December 9, 2022 – April 9, 2023

=== 2021 ===
- Ally Brody: Public Domain January 16 – April 18, 2021
- The American Dream November 21, 2020 – March 7, 2021
- Jeremy Dean: Neither I, Nor Time, Nor History February 19 – May 30, 2021
- The Circle and the Square October 2, 2020 – June 6, 2021
- Romancing the Mirror December 4, 2020 – June 20, 2021
- Heirloom: Weaving Memory With the Now March 26 – August 1, 2021
- Imagination Squared^{10} March 26 – August 1, 2021
- Art With a Heart: Behind The Mask September 11, 2021 – January 2, 2022
- Doug Eng: Structure of Nature | Nature of Structure July 9, 2021 – January 2, 2022
- Damián Ortega August 27, 2021 – January 16, 2022
- Techno-Intimacy August 13, 2021 – February 13, 2022
- Left Side Right Side June 25, 2021 – March 6, 2022

=== 2020 ===
- Virginia Derryberry: Private Domain January 16 – March 22, 2020
- Jenn Peek: (I)dentify as Phoenix December 2019 – April 12, 2020
- Project Atrium: Rina Banerjee March 20 – June 28, 2020
- Recent Acquisitions: History in the Making January 10 – September 20, 2020
- Project Atrium: Rina Banerjee July 1 – October 25, 2020
- Breaking Boundaries: The Vision of Jacqueline B. Holmes February 20 – November 15, 2020
- A Decade of Art With a Heart: Celebrating 10 Years of Partnership September 12 – December 13, 2020
- Urban Spaces December 17, 2020 – January 10, 2021
- The American Dream November 21, 2020 – March 7, 2021
- Project Atrium: Carl Joe Williams November 20, 2020 – March 21, 2021
- Multiple Ones: Contemporary Perspectives in Printmedia July 1, 2020 – March 21, 2021

=== 2019 ===
- Project Atrium: Evan Roth: Since You Were Born March 16 – June 23, 2019
- Urban Spaces April 20 – July 7, 2019
- Invisible Cities: Paintings by Nathan Lewis March 2 – July 21, 2019
- Micro-Macro: Andrew Sendor and Ali Banisadr February 2 – July 28, 2019
- Creative Campers: Art Camp Anthology Vol. 3 April 13 – August 4, 2019
- Project Atrium: Khalid Albaih: Camp/Wall/Flock July 20 – October 27, 2019
- Project Atrium: Kedgar Volta: The Fragility of Promise November 15, 2019 – March 1, 2020

=== 2018 ===
- Art + Politics March 14 – April 4, 2018
- Pledges of Allegiance March 14 – April 4, 2018
- Project Atrium: Anila Quayyum Agha March 10 – June 24, 2018
- Art Camp Anthology Vol. 2 April 28 – July 29, 2018
- A Patterned Response March 31 – August 19, 2018
- Attentive Arrangements April 1 – August 19, 2018
- A Dark Place of Dreams: Louise Nevelson with Chakaia Booker, Lauren Fensterstock and Kate Gilmore April 28 – September 9, 2018
- A World of Their Own: Art With a Heart in Healthcare August 4 – December 2, 2018
- Gideon Mendel: Drowning World August 31 – December 9, 2018
- Frank Stella Unbound: Literature and Printmaking October 6, 2018 – January 13, 2019
- In the Water September 1, 2018 – February 24, 2019
- Project Atrium: Amanda Coogan: The Ladder is Always There November 26, 2018 – February 24, 2019
- Spotlight: Marc Chagall's Dress November 26, 2018 – February 24, 2019
- Interior Geography: Mark Lester December 8, 2018 – April 7, 2019
- Painting the Picture: Works From the Permanent Collection December 22, 2018 – May 12, 2019

=== 2017 ===
- Project Atrium: Juan Fontanive, Movement 4
- Call & Response
- Project Atrium: Gabriel Dawe, Plexus No. 38
- Synthesize: Art + Music
- Project Atrium: Lauren Fensterstock
- Bands of Color: the Use of Line in Contemporary Art
- Hans Hofmann: Works on Paper
- The Evolution of Mark-Making
- UNF Gallery Iterations: Lorrie Fredette
- UNF Gallery Frank Rampolla: the DNA of the Mark
- Another Side Revealed: Art with a Heart in Healthcare
- Art Camp Anthology

=== 2016 ===
- Retro-spective: Analog Photography in a Digital World
- Breaking Ground: the Donald and Maria Cox Collection
- Project Atrium: Shinique Smith: Quickening
- Project Atrium: Nicola Lopez
- Confronting the Canvas: Women of Abstraction
- Project Atrium: Ethan Murrow
- Time Zones: James Rosenquist and Printmaking at the Millennium
- In Living Color: Andy Warhol and Contemporary Printmaking (from the Collections of Jordan D. Schnitzer and His Family)
- UNF Gallery Leaves: Recent Prints and Sculpture by Donald Martin
- UNF Gallery Sustain: Clay to Table
- UNF Gallery Amer Kobaslija: A Sense of Place
- UNF Gallery The Other: Nurturing a New Ecology in Printmaking
- Mary Ratcliff, Interwoven: Hear, Home, and Community
- Inside the Outline: Art with a Heart in Healthcare
- Rock Paper Scissors: the Printmaking Process

=== 2015 ===
- Project Atrium: Ian Johnston: Fish Tales
- Smoke and Mirrors: Sculpture and the Imaginary
- Project Atrium: Joelle Dietrick: Cargomobilities
- Southern Exposure: Portraits of a Changing Landscape
- In Time We Shall Know Ourselves: Photographs by Raymond Smith
- Project Atrium; Angela Glajcar: Terforation
- WHITE
- UNF Gallery Avery Lawrence: Live in Jacksonville
- UNF Gallery Assemblage/Collage: Works by Phil Parker
- UNF Gallery John Hee Taek Chae: Barbara Ritzman Devereux Visiting Artist Exhibition
- UNF Gallery 2015 Art Ventures Grant Awards Artists, The Community Foundation for Northeast Florida
- Amanda Rosenblatt: Allegory of Fortune
- Unmasked: Art with a Heart in Healthcare
- Art Aviators Exhibition

=== 2014 ===
- Project Atrium: Angela Strassheim
- Get Real: New American Painting
- Project Atrium: Caroline Lathan-Steifel: Wider Than the Sky
- The New York Times Magazine Photographs
- Project Atrium: Sean Thurston
- Observing Objects: Works by Leigh Murphy
- Material Transformations
- Erica Mendoza: Visual Love Letters
- A Thousand Words: A Photo Response Project
- Express Your #Selfie: Art with a Heart in Healthcare
- Scholastic Art Exhibition: Gold Key Portfolio Winners
- Rainbow Artists Exhibition
- UNF Gallery Art + Design Faculty Exhibition
- UNF Gallery Juxtaposition: Works by Larry Wilson & Laurie Hitzig
- UNF Gallery Backdoor Formalism
- UNF Gallery Bede Clarke: Barbara Ritzman Devereux Visiting Artist Exhibition

=== 2013 ===
- Art with a Heart in Healthcare
- Project Atrium: Heather Cox
- Kept Time: Photographs by Joseph D. Jachna
- Inside/Out: MOCA's Permanent Collection
- Project Atrium: Sarah Emerson
- Michael Aurbach
- SLOW: Marking Time in Photography and Film
- UNF Student Juried Exhibition
- First Coast Portfolio

=== 2012 ===
- Project Atrium: Ian Bogost
- ReFocus: Art of the 1980s
- Project Atrium: Tristin Lowe
- Annual UNF Art & Design Faculty Exhibition
- In This Moment: Art with a Heart in Healthcare Exhibition
- Rendering Italy: UNF Art and Design Faculty Abroad
- ReFocus: Art of the 1970s
- Project Atrium: Mark Licari
- The Joys of Collecting: Selections from the Eisen Collection
- Rainbow Artists: Art and Autism Across the Spectrum Exhibition
- Carrie Ann Baade: Solar Midnight
- Joe Forkan: The Lebowski Cycle
- North East Florida Scholastic Art Award
- ReFocus: Art of the 1960s

=== 2011 ===
- Tamara Culbert: 2011 Memphis Wood Excellence in Teaching Award
- Project Atrium: Gustavo Godoy
- UNF Art and Design Faculty Exhibition
- Larry Clark: The Tulsa Series
- Shared Vision: The Sondra Gilman and Celso Gonzalez-Falla Collection of Photography
- No Place in Particular: Images of the American Landscape
- Project Atrium: Melanie Pullen
- What a Doll: The Human Object as Toy
- Stranger in Paradise: The Works of Reverend Howard Finster
- What A Doll: The Human Object As Toy
- Rainbow Artists: Art and Autism Across the Spectrum Exhibition
- FUSION: Ceramic Exhibition by the FIRM: Shane Christensen, Brian Jensen, Stephen Heywood, and Michael Schmidt
- Wind Weaver and the Whirling Wheel: A Tale of Wolfbat Romance
- The Art of Seating: 200 Years of American Design
- Chair Installation by Dolf James
- Edge of Your Seat: Design Challenge, a juried student show in conjunction with The Art of Seating

=== 2010 ===
- East/West: Visually Speaking
- UNF Art and Design Faculty Exhibition
- Imagination Squared: A Community Response Project
- Hyperbolic Nature: Plein Air Paintings by Lilian Garcia-Roig
- Tradition Redefined: The Larry and Brenda Thompson Collection of African American Art
- Marilyn Monroe: Life as a Legend
- Looking Forward, Looking Back: Celebrating the Contributions and Careers of Artist/Educators Larry Davis, Mark Howard & Paul Ladnier
- Dan Estabrook: Forever and Never

=== 2009 ===
- Separate Strategies & Common Goals
- Hamish MacEwan: 90 in 09
- Robert Motherwell: Lost in Form, Found in Line
- The Art of Teaching: UNF Faculty Exhibition
- Emergence: Works by UNF Sculpture Students
- Balance and Power: Performance and Surveillance in Video Art
- Jazz Giants: The Photography of Herman Leonard
- Why Look at Animals? Photography from the George Eastman Collection

=== 2008 ===
- Ultra-Realistic Sculpture by Marc Sijan
- Making Marks: Jacksonville Creates
- The Shape Of Things: Selections From The Permanent Collection
- And Further the Dew Drop Falls: Installations by Chris Natrop
- Civitates Orbis Terrarum: Recent Drawings by John Bailly
- Carly, So Far: Photographs by Francie Bishop Good
- Memphis Wood: Jacksonville's First Lady of the Arts
- Contemporary Visions: A Focus on Jacksonville Collections
- Ramen Noodles 2008: Installation by Sang-Wook Lee
- Continental Shifts: The Art of Edouard Duval-Carrié

=== 2007 ===
- Essence and Materials: Works by Minoru Ohira
- Sculptures by Duncan Johnson
- Raddle Cross & Dowsing: Installations by Martha Whittington
- Coherent Structures: Recent Silverpoint Paintings by Carol Prusa
- Valuistics: The Making Of: An Installation by James Greene
- Contemporary Currents: Selections from the Bank of America Collection
- Impermanence: Recent Works by Andrés Michelena
- Keyhole: Constructed Paintings by Todd Murphy
- Second Skins: Sculptural Soundsuits and Tondos by Nick Cave
- Anderson and Low: Athlete/Warrior

=== 2006 ===
- Green Grass/Black Wings: Paintings by Ian Chase
- Time Capsules: Illuminated Works by Jon Davis
- Bloom: Paintings and Constructions by Luis Cruz Azaceta
- Pilgrimages: Large-Scale Drawings by Clive King
- Nature of Elegy: Works by Timothy McDowell
- Flow: Paintings & Installations by Radcliffe Bailey
- Illuminating Space: New Works by Zac Freeman
- Artifacts: Photographs by David Halliday
- Cheerleaders, Bodybuilders and Disco Queens: Photographs by Brian Finke & Morten Nilsson
- Sheltering Eye: Selections from the Prentice and Paul Sack Photography Collection

=== 2005 ===
- That's Another Story: Works by Ke Francis
- 30th Parallel: A Convergence of Contemporary Painting featuring Radcliffe Bailey, John Bailly, Jim Barsness, Luisa Basnuevo, Mark Messersmith, Rocio Rodriguez, Lynne Ridings, Barry Sparkman
- Transitions: Sculptures and Prints by Joe Segal
- Activating Space: Sculpture as Environment featuring Tim Curtis, David Geiser, George Long, Jeffery Loy & Joe Martin, Michael Murrell, Jimmy O'Neal
- Tonya Lee: New Works
- Shared Vision: Photographs of Baracoa, Cuba – A Collaborative Documentary

=== 2004 ===
- Mark Sain Wilson: Photographs
- Image & Energy: Selections from the Haskell Collection
- Pam Longobardi: World within Worlds
- Push Play: Redefining Pop featuring Ray Azcuy, Didi Dunphy, David Isenhour, J. Ivcevich, Federico Uribe and Irene Clouthier
- Arnold Mesches: A Painting History 1940-2003
- Fruition: New Works by Sarah Crooks Flaire

=== 2003 ===
- David Crown: Mezzotints
- Subject/Object: Photographs by Jay Shoots
- Intuition & Response: Masterworks from the Edward R. Broida Collection
- Jonathan Lux: New Paintings
- High Tide: Works by Joe Walters
- Woody Cornwell: New Paintings
- Skin: Contemporary Views of the Body featuring Magdalena Abakanowicz, Sebastian Blanck, Connie Imboden, Pam Longobardi, Rona Pondick, Terry Rodgers
- The Consuming Image: New Painterly Pop featuring Alisa Henriquez, Ales Bask Hostomsky, James Mahoney, Chris Peldo, Michael Thrush, David Williams

=== 2002 ===
- Alt.Photo: Redefining Process featuring Linda Broadfoot, Thomas Hager, Paul Karabinis, Dominick Martorelli
- Contemporary Regional Sculptors featuring Nofa Dixon, Bob Kirk, Jan Tomlinson Master, David Royal Olson

=== 2001 ===
- Neobotanica: Flora by Four Contemporary Artists featuring David Collins, David Geiser, Timothy McDowell, Barbara Rogers
- American Beauty: Sculptures by Jack Dowd
- Towards the Organic: Material and Metaphor featuring Karen Rich Beall, Tim Curtis, Celeste Roberge

=== 2000 ===
- Image Electric: The Work of Richard Heipp
