= James Siena =

American painter

- Born: October 28, 1957 (age 68); Oceanside, California, U.S.
- Education: Cornell University
- Known for: Painting, Printmaking, Sculpture
- Spouses: Iris Rose, Katia Santibañez

James Siena (born October 28, 1957) is an American contemporary artist. His art is typically created through a series of self-imposed constraints also sometimes referred to as visual algorithms—rules Siena decides on before sitting down to work. In most of his work he establishes a basic unit and action and repeats it. While originally recognized for his paintings using enamel paints on aluminum plates, Siena has also become known for his drawings, prints, typed works on paper using vintage typewriters, and sculpture. Sculptures have ranged from made with his own hands using common materials such as: toothpicks, bamboo skewers bound with string, and grape vines to his larger sculptures that have been realized in bronze and wood in partnership with the Walla Walla Foundry. He is based in New York City.

== Early life and education ==
James Siena was born in Oceanside, California in 1957 but lived and grew up in Washington D.C. until the age of 12, when his family moved to California in 1969. He moved to New York in 1975 to attend Cornell University in Ithaca, New York. He received his Bachelor of Fine Arts (B.F.A.) in 1979 from Cornell University.

Asked to name the teacher who most influenced him, Siena quickly cites Mary Croston, an after-school art instructor who taught him as a teenager. Croston treated her young students as “real” artists, says Siena, introducing them to such tools as charcoal and graphite and coaching them in figure drawing. “She just taught the basics; that was very influential,” he says of those classes in the “art hut” behind Croston's house in Stanford, California. Siena also remembers being “very moved” by the late Peter Kahn, who taught the history of techniques at Cornell. According to Siena, “He was a marvelous Renaissance man” who taught his students such skills as determining whether paper is archival quality and making ink out of toast crumbs and saliva.

After earning his B.F.A. at Cornell University, Siena chose to relocate to New York rather than pursue graduate studies. There, he found numerous mentors within the local art community. He was particularly influenced by the “very independent, visionary spirit” of Alan Saret, who introduced him to working with metal at the scrapyard. Chuck Close provided practical guidance, explaining foundational concepts such as developing relationships with galleries—described by Close as a “conversation”—and strategies for maximizing income from day jobs to allow more time for painting. Before becoming a full-time artist, Siena supported himself as a frame maker.

Prior to becoming an established and recognized visual artist, James Siena was known for his performance art, which included singing and rapping with his now ex-wife Iris Rose and Chazz Dean. Most notably he appeared on Cinemax's TV series Dangerous Film Club during the 1987 season of the show.

== Early career ==
Siena started making abstract paintings with an aesthetic that sought inspiration from Artificial Intelligence (AI). For years he has been investigating the imaginary space of programmers' source and patterns through paint. At first glance the images could be labeled as decorative puzzles or labyrinths but there is a logic base for each painting. Siena's first major solo show was held at the Brooklyn, New York, gallery, Pierogi 2000 in 1996. His first solo museum exhibition took place in 2003 at the San Francisco Art Institute Gallery. Since then he's had numerous solo shows including at Gorney Bravin + Lee in New York, Daniel Weinberg Gallery in San Francisco and Los Angeles, and The Pace Gallery in New York.

His work has been featured in over 50 group exhibitions, including most notably the Whitney Museum of American Art's 2004 Whitney Biennial. Siena has had work either reviewed or published in the following publications: Art in America, The New York Times, The New Yorker, ARTnews, The Art Newspaper, The Village Voice, New York Sun, San Francisco Chronicle and Art on Paper.

In Patricia Phillips, chair of the Department of Art, Cornell University; letter of Siena's nomination for the 2009-10 Eissner Artist of the Year Award, she wrote:

"James Siena is one of the most inventive, independent, focused and prolific artists working today. … Thirty years after he received his B.F.A. from Cornell, Siena has emerged as one of the art world's internationally respected leaders. … [He] balances the traditions of 20th–21st century abstraction with a maverick sensibility to craft salient, if speculative, insights on the contemporary world, and the intricate workings of human perception."

Siena has also played muse for other artists including being a subject for paintings and sculpture by Joe Fig and multiple works of art by Chuck Close.

Siena also appeared on camera in the 2008 documentary film, Herb and Dorothy by Megumi Sasaki. The film is about the long-time New York contemporary art collector couple, Herbert and Dorothy Vogel.

Rare among contemporary artists, Siena uses no assistants in the creation of his paintings and drawings.

In 2017, the James Siena Catalogue Raisonné, was published as a digital catalogue raisonné by Artifex Press, New York. The first volume includes Siena's complete paintings, sculptures, and gouaches from 1989 to the present and a large selection of early works.

Siena also completed several artist-in-residency program, most notably at the Yaddo artist community (located in Saratoga Springs, New York) in 2004, and was elected a Member of the Board at Yaddo in 2008. He completed a residence in October 2012 as the Arthur L. and Sheila Prensky Island Press Visiting Artist at Washington University in St. Louis. In the winter of 2009, Siena was selected as the visual artist "Master Artist-in-Residence" at the Atlantic Center for the Arts in Florida.

Siena is also a member of the faculty of the MFA Fine Arts department at the School of Visual Arts, and is listed as a mentor for the Master of Fine Arts (MFA) in Studio Art program at the University of the Arts (Philadelphia).

Siena was elected an Academician at the National Academy of Design in 2011 and to the Board of Governors in 2016, where he currently serves as the Chairman of the Abbey Council.

Siena was appointed critic in painting / printmaking at Yale University in 2015.

== Prints ==
James Siena is known for having a passion for prints and the art of printmaking. In addition to his paintings and sculpture, Siena has made over 120 prints using a variety of techniques in collaboration with some of the most recognized art presses in the United States and abroad; including Universal Limited Art Editions (ULAE), Tamarind Institute, Harlan & Weaver, Flying Horse Editions, Pace Prints and Polígrafa Obra Gráfica.

In particular, Harlan & Weaver have published several individual prints and two portfolios of nine prints with Siena. The close proximity of their studios has helped to foster an enduring working relationship. Prints by James Siena have been featured in five New Print Shows by the International Print Center New York (IPCNY) since 2000.

Siena was invited to ULAE by Larissa Goldston in the summer of 2003. Although he had been making prints for years, he came to ULAE specifically to explore stone lithography.

Siena's work is in the Metropolitan Museum of Art, the Museum of Modern Art, and the Whitney Museum of American Art.

== Other projects ==
=== Books ===
James Siena has contributed illustrations or accompanying prints for several books. The first, a collection of poems by Geoffrey Young, first published in 1996, "Pockets of Wheat" contains camera reduction images of James Siena's intricate 60" X 40" black-and-white ink drawings, including the cover illustration. In 2003, Siena also contributed artwork to another book of poems by Geoffrey Young, entitled "Lights Out", published by the small press, The Figures.

Printed in 2005 was a limited edition of 200 copies of "Spring" (an excerpt from a larger work entitled, "The Weather") by Kenneth Goldsmith. Siena contributed five 2-color wood engravings with each book. Each book is signed by the author, Kenneth Goldsmith and Siena. Edition was published by Didymous Press, a moniker used by INC, inc. for their self-published works.

Another book project, published in 2009 by Granary Books, is a limited edition of 50 copies titled, "Oaths? Questions?" in partnership with Marjorie Welish. This book of poetry by Welish is really a collaboration with Siena's artwork and the words, printed on transparent pages plays off of the artwork. James Siena commented about the book:

"To summarize an Artist’s Book in a statement raises questions as to its very utility. But there were needs to be met in my first collaboration with Marjorie Welish, and they can be verbalized. So: no summary, just a run-down of issues and urges. Among them was the urgent desire to make something quite unlike a print, painting, or drawing. To make a Book in all its Bookness, sequential, teleological, inevitable. As well as strange, of course. To tell the story of a making of something, to undo it, page by page. So this book takes us apart and puts us back together again, none the worse for wear, but certainly not the same as before. And the words offer hints to the truth (oaths) and doubts about them as well (questions). Their very transparency evidences the debt they owe to the wordless visual." - James Siena

Also in 2009 Siena created "Sequence", published and printed by Flying Horse Editions, a hand-printed, double-sided accordion book that stretches seventeen-feet long. The double-sided book follows a linear, geometric pattern as it coalesces and unwinds through thirty-six pages, black intertwining with red, and in reverse. The abstraction climaxes on two final frames (back and front), where the sequence reaches its full realization and the rule is maximized, having gone through seventeen 'moves.'

=== Design ===
The Yaddo Artist Medal, established in 2014, was designed by James Siena and produced by Walla Walla Foundry in Walla Walla, Washington. The process began by creating a 3D model based on designs submitted by Siena. A combination of machining, etching, and hand finishing was used to fabricate the medal to achieve the highest possible level of detail in the finished piece. The inaugural winner, was the author, Philip Roth.

Siena is a known wine enthusiast and helped design the wine label and logo for the Oregon-based winery, Illahe Vineyards in 2011. As per the winery's website:

"Our label was designed by artist James Siena and letterpress artist Ruth Lingen who worked together to create a classic look with American fonts from the early 1900s... All thanks to our friend Dan Schmidt, also a New York artist, a few bottles of the earliest Illahe products showed up at James’s studio lunch table on Canal Street. Now, James is a huge fan of Burgundy and Bordeaux, but it was the viognier that he enjoyed so much that he offered to design a label for us. He worked with Ruth Lingen at Pace Prints (Pace Gallery represents James), and they came up with a label, now our reserve label, that incorporates letterpress fonts from the 19th century and a ‘necker’ with the vintage... Best of all, James redesigned our logo based on the word Illahe from the Duployan script that Merry Young found for the winery."

=== Rugs ===
The art gallery BravinLee has also issued two series of hand-knotted wool rugs based on James Siena designs. The rugs are similar to artworks in that they are made in limited numbered quantities along with artists proofs and each is signed by the artist. The two designs are entitled Global Key, 2009 (Edition of 15 + 2 APs) and Nine Constant Windows, Second Version, 2009 (Edition of 18 + 2 APs).

=== Gallery ===
James Siena also runs a small project gallery called: Sometimes (Works of Art) located on Canal Street. When asked when and why he decided to open an art gallery, Siena responded, "It was in the fall of 2009, as the art world was at its nadir; galleries were closing, artists weren't selling, pessimism abounded. I decided the time was ripe for and artist-driven response to all this, and to make something happen outside the gallery system. Shows would be longer; there would be music or performances at the openings; events during the run of the show would be encouraged (readings, music, discussion), and the artist, if possible, would sit the gallery on the one day per week it would be open. That way, viewers would meet the person who made the work, thus encouraging a new kind of interaction."

Artists whose work has been shown at the gallery include, David Brody, Tim Maul, Aura Rosenberg, Dan Schmidt, Peter Scott, and Fred Valentine. As Time Out New York magazine comments, "This tiny, artist-run space has no website but showcases venerable artists established on the New York scene. One example of the proprietor's collection of antique typewriters is on view at all times in the gallery."

=== Theatre ===
In 1989 Siena partnered with Conrad Cummings in writing Photo Op, a 60min long contemporary opera. Siena wrote the words (libretto) and Cummings the music. In 2012, UrbanArias, a local Washington DC–based company that specializes in small-scale, contemporary, and experimental operas staged a production of Photo Op. UrbanArias’ producer/conductor Robert Wood notes that, although Siena and Cummings wrote Photo Op in 1989, “the immediacy of this opera 20 years later is uncanny.” That's because it's so clichéd. Maybe we should blame the politicians more than the librettist; they are, after all, the ones who keep getting caught in their zippers.

== Personal life ==
James Siena is married to artist Katia Santibañez. They were featured jointly in the Ferrin Gallery's group show, COUPLES from 2010. Santibañez and Siena also recently partnered on two prints with Shore Publishing where each took turns carving on the same reductive woodcuts. Siena splits his time between homes in western Massachusetts (the Berkshires) and New York City and maintains a studio on Canal Street.

Siena is also known for his affinity towards, knowledge and collection of vintage typewriters and has commented that he owns over 100 typewriters and enjoys the sometimes novel approaches earlier manufacturers took in solving problems or creating enhancements to their typewriters.
