= Orlando Museum of Art =

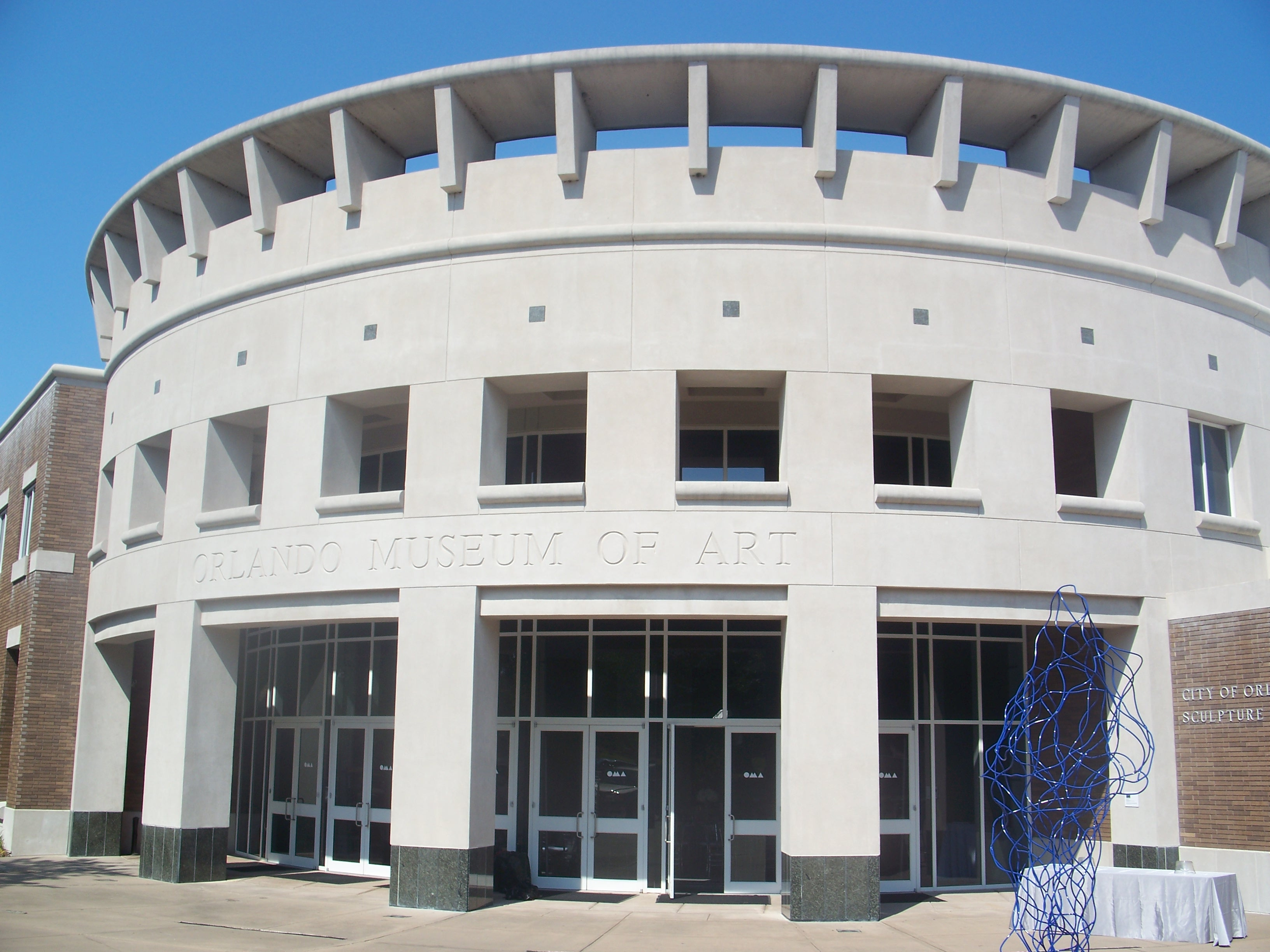

- Location within Florida
- Established: 1924; 102 years ago
- Location: 2416 North Mills Avenue; Orlando, Florida
- Coordinates: 28.57271°N 81.36444°W
- Type: Art museum
- Accreditation: American Alliance of Museums
- Director: Cathryn Mattson
- Curator: Coralie Claeysen-Gleyzon
- Public transit access: 125
- Parking: On site (no charge)
- Website: www.omart.org

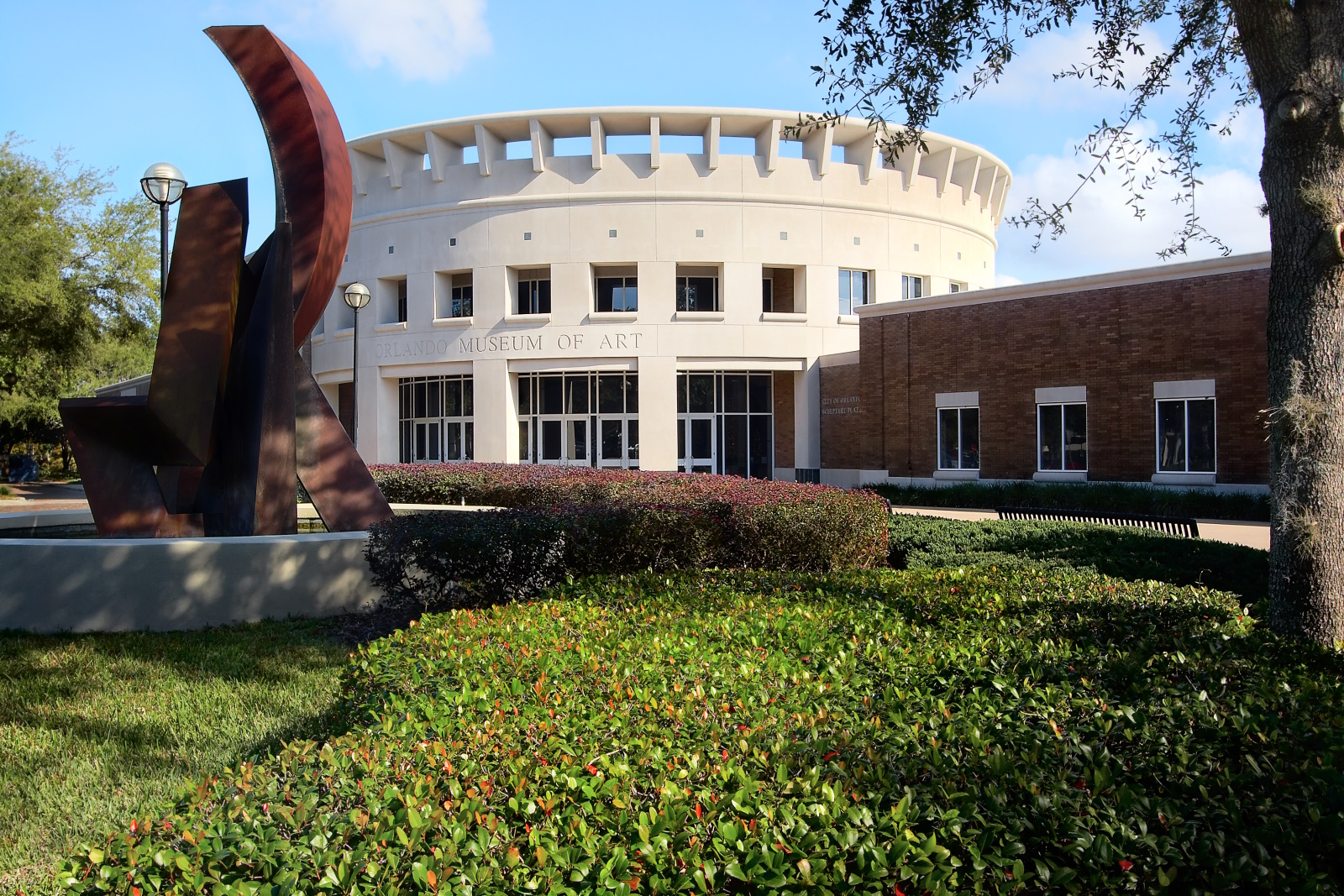
Orlando Museum of Art building and grounds

The Orlando Museum of Art (OMA) is a 501 (c) 3 not-for-profit organization directly serving greater Orlando, Orange County and Central Florida. The museum was founded in 1924 by a group of art enthusiasts.

== General ==
OMA presents a rotating series of temporary exhibitions originated by the museum matched by traveling shows that are complemented by permanent collection exhibitions and continuous education programs for people of all ages. OMA hosts year-round workshops, art appreciation classes, lectures, seminars, films and guided tours for children and adults.

In 2014, the museum launched the exhibition initiative titled The Florida Prize in Contemporary Art which features work produced by the most progressive and thought-provoking emerging and mid-career artists living and working in the State of Florida today.

OMA is accredited by the American Alliance of Museums (AAM) and is a member of the North American Reciprocal Museums program.

== History ==
The history of the Orlando Museum of Art (OMA) is one of growth guided by community leadership. OMA was founded in 1924 as Orlando Art Association. Its name was changed to the Loch Haven Art Center in 1960, and again to the Orlando Museum of Art in 1986.

The organization began as a small art center with a group of artists who met informally in the early 1920s, displaying and critiquing their work. In the late 1950s, the community raised funds to build a new facility designed by James Gamble Rogers III, which was completed in 1960.

OMA began to collect art in 1960 when it accepted the donations of important American paintings by Georgia O'Keeffe and Charles Sheeler. OMA continued its expansion, working with architects Nils Schweizer and Duane Stark, both students of Frank Lloyd Wright. By 1969 OMA had added new galleries, a 250-seat auditorium, three studio classrooms, a library, vault and offices.

During the 1970s, OMA was given a major collection of Art of the Ancient Americas, and additional works of African Art, and also formed the nucleus of its acclaimed Contemporary American Graphics Collection.

In 1985, OMA was designated a "major cultural institution" by the State of Florida.

In 1997, OMA completed a $13.5 million facility renovation and building project which expanded the facility to its current size of 80,000 square feet.

In 2022, the Federal Bureau of Investigation (FBI) investigated artwork attributed to Jean-Michel Basquiat in the OMA exhibition Heroes & Monsters. The exhibition, which consisted of 25 paintings on reclaimed cardboard, opened in February 2022 and was originally planned to run through June 2023. After news of the investigation, the exhibition was set to close early on June 30, 2022. On June 24, 2022, the FBI removed the entire exhibition after the works' authenticity was questioned. The paintings were claimed to have been purchased by Thad Mumford directly from Basquiat for $5,000 in 1982 and then placed in storage, where they remained until being rediscovered in 2012. An affidavit obtained by The New York Times revealed that Mumford told a federal agent in 2014 that he "never purchased Basquiat artwork and was unaware of any Basquiat artwork being in his storage locker." He signed an affidavit in 2017, a year before his death, stating that he had never met Basquiat. A few days after the FBI seizure, the board released a statement announcing that De Groft is no longer the Director and CEO of the museum. Joann Walfish, a longtime employee who served as the CFO, was appointed interim COO. The New York Times later reported that the museum's board of trustees that had planned to see the resignation of chair Cynthia Brumback were themselves removed, citing a previously overlooked rule that limited trustees to nine-year terms. Two days later, Brumback resigned and the board of trustees elected Mark Elliot as the museum's new chair. In January 2024, The New York Times reported the scandal led to significant financial distress for the museum, due to a reduction in donor support as well as costs for dealing with the aftermath.

== Collections ==
OMA's collection boasts more than 2,400 objects including Contemporary Art, American Art from the 18th century to 1945, Art of the Ancient Americas and African Art. The Art of the Ancient Americas collection is among the finest of its kind in the Southeastern United States.

On May 1, 2018, OMA announced that it may become the permanent home of an extensive collection of the paintings of Belgian Post-Impressionist painter, Louis Dewis. OMA presented a small exhibition of seven Dewis paintings from May 18 through September 9, 2018, as a preview of a major Dewis exhibition presented January 25 through May 5, 2019.

== Florida Prize in Contemporary Art Exhibition ==
The annual Florida Prize in Contemporary Art has become one of the Orlando Museum of Art’s more anticipated exhibitions, aiming to bring recognition to the progressive artists in the state. Each year OMA’s curators survey artists working throughout the state, then invite 10 artists participate. One artist receives a $20,000 award, underwritten since 2017 by local philanthropists Gail and Michael Winn.

Artists range from emerging to mid-career, often with distinguished records of exhibitions and awards that reflect recognition at national and international levels. In all cases, they are artists who are engaged in exploring significant ideas of art and culture in original and visually exciting ways. As of 2022, the exhibition has brought 80 Florida artists new levels of recognition.

As a survey exhibition, the Florida Prize always brings together artists of diverse backgrounds and varying practices. It seeks to be a snapshot of the state’s cultural vitality.

Year	Artist		Year	Artist		Year	Artist	
2014	Sarah Max Beck		2015	Farley Aguilar	Winner	2016	Anthea Behm	
2014	Elisabeth Condon		2015	Bhakti Baxter		2016	Adler Guerrier	
2014	Vanessa Diaz		2015	Cesar Cornejo		2016	Maria Martinez-Canas	
2014	Christopher Harris		2015	Michael Covello		2016	Noelle Mason	Winner
2014	Ezra Johnson		2015	Rob Duarte		2016	Ernesto Oroza	
2014	Brookhart Jonquil		2015	Jennifer Kaczmarek		2016	Matt Roberts	
2014	Sinisa Kukec		2015	Nicolas Lobo		2016	Dawn Roe	
2014	Jillian Mayer		2015	Wanda Raimundi-Ortiz		2016	Kyle Trowbridge	
2014	Juan Travieso		2015	Alex Trimino		2016	Michael Vasquez	
2014	Augustina Woodgate	Winner	2015	Antonia Wright		2016	Sergio Vega	
Year	Artist		Year	Artist		Year	Artist	
2017	Domingo Castillo		2018	Carlos Betancourt	People's Choice	2019	Robert Aiosa	
2017	William Cordova	Winner	2018	Brooks Dierdorff		2019	Joe Fig	People's Choice
2017	Coco Fusco		2018	Rafael Domenech		2019	Lilian Garcia-Roig	
2017	Mark Gerstein		2018	Gonzalo Fuenmayor		2019	Lola Gómez	
2017	Aramis Gutierrez		2018	Ya La'Ford		2019	Amer Kobaslija	
2017	Dana Hargrove		2018	Jason Lazarus		2019	Pepe Mar	
2017	Lisa Iglesias		2018	Glexis Novoa		2019	Anja Marais	
2017	Carl Juste	People's Choice	2018	Kerry Phillips		2019	Edison Peñafiel	Winner
2017	Ralph Provisero		2018	Kenya (Robinson)	Winner	2019	Vickie Pierre	
2017	Chase Westfall		2018	Jack Stenner		2019	Sri Prabha	
Year	Artist		Year	Artist		Year	Artist	
2020/21	Lauren Mitchell		2022	London Amara		2023	TBA	
2020/21	Matthew Cornell	People's Choice	2022	Francie Bishop-Good		2023	TBA	
2020/21	Tra Bouscaren		2022	Tomas Esson		2023	TBA	
2020/21	Richard Heipp		2022	Dominique Labauvie		2023	TBA	
2020/21	Clara Varas		2022	Jared McGriff	Winner	2023	TBA	
2020/21	Anastasia Samoylova		2022	Hiromi Moneyhun	People's Choice	2023	TBA	
2020/21	Sean Miller		2022	Gavin Perry		2023	TBA	
2020/21	Marielle Plaisir		2022	Jamilah Sabur		2023	TBA	
2020/21	Robert Rivers	Winner	2022	Sara Stites		2023	TBA	
2020/21	Kedgar Volta		2022	Typoe (Gran)		2023	TBA	
