= Lilian Garcia-Roig =

Cuban-born American painter

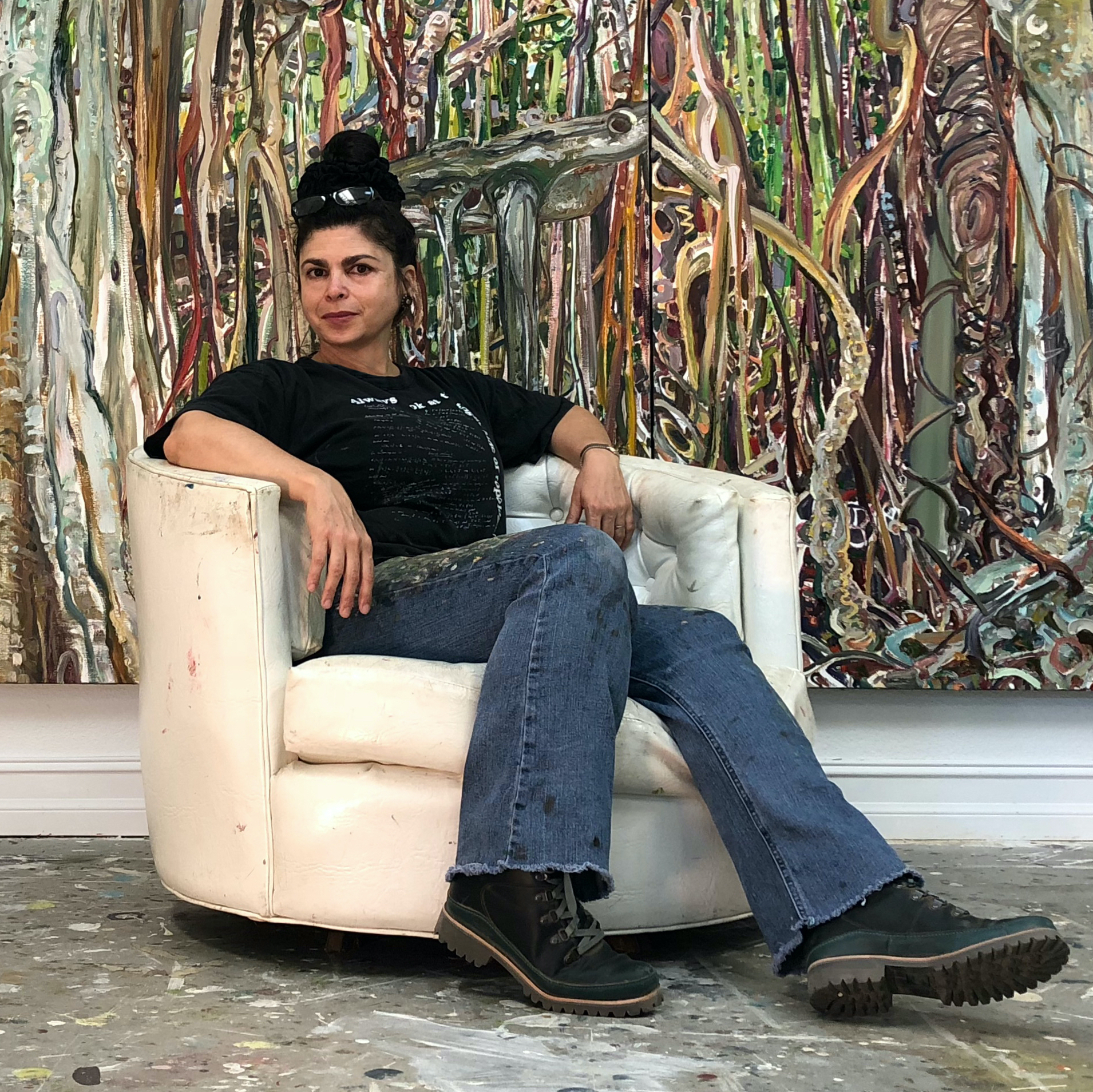
- Born: Havana, Cuba
- Education: University of Pennsylvania
- Known for: Painting
- Awards: Joan Mitchell Foundation Award in Painting, Joan Mitchell Foundation Artist-in-Residence (NOLA), MacDowell Colony Fellow, Kimbrough Award, Dallas Museum of Art
- Website: www.liliangarcia-roig.com

Lilian Garcia-Roig (born 1966) is a Cuban-born, American painter based in Florida. She is mostly known for her large-scale painting installations of densely forested landscapes.

Garcia-Roig is a professor in the Department of Art at Florida State University, and has been named FSU's 2023-2024 Robert O. Lawton Distinguished Professor.

== Education ==
Lilian Garcia-Roig was born in Havana, Cuba in 1966. She was raised in Houston, Texas and attended Southern Methodist University on a Meadows Fine Arts scholarship. In 1990, she received her M.F.A. from the University of Pennsylvania with the Charles Addams Memorial Prize in Fine Art for most outstanding graduate student. In addition, she studied at the Skowhegan School of Painting and Sculpture during the summer of 1990.

== Teaching Career ==
Garcia-Roig then joined the faculty at the University of Texas at Austin, rising to tenured associate professor by 1996. She won multiple awards, including a Kimbrough Award for outstanding Texas artist under 30 in 1992, a Mid-America Arts Alliance NEA in Painting in 1994, and an Artist-in-Residence Fellowship at the Vermont Studio Center.

In 1999, Garcia-Roig took a two-year leave from University of Austin and became a visiting associate professor at UC Berkeley. During the summer of 1999, Garcia-Roig traveled back to Havana, Cuba, as a visiting artist of the Ludwig Foundation of Cuba, where she began to develop work surrounding her Cuban-American identity. In 2001, Garcia-Roig joined the faculty at Florida State University, was appointed the director of graduate studies in 2002, promoted to tenured full professor in 2007, and department chair in 2020.

== Work ==
Garcia-Roig is most known for her large-scale painting installations of dense natural landscapes. These works are painted across multiple panels and installed together, often covering the entirety of a wall. She considers place as integral to her subject and process, intending for the scale of her work to overwhelm the viewer’s perceptual senses by creating a new visual environment. She paints en plain air capturing landscapes in real time as light changes. With thick layers and brushstrokes, her work borders between the identifiable and the abstract.

Negotiating her identity as a Cuban-born American, her work dwells on how the intersection of power, knowledge, discovery, and loss have shaped both global and personal histories.

“[...] I am drawn to wilderness and dense landscape subjects out of a deep psychological need to connect. I attempt to negotiate the propositions of “sense of place” and “belonging” that so influence the construction of personal identity. I believe that my comfort with, and aesthetic attraction to, a multifaceted and fluid postmodern existence results from my biography. Cuban-born and American-raised, I have learned to see things from at least two culturally distinct, and often opposing, perspectives.”

== Exhibitions ==
Garcia-Roig has shown nationally at the National Museum of Women in the Arts and the Art Museum of the Americas both in Washington, D.C. and extensively in the South, especially in Texas and Florida. Internationally, she has shown at the Chopo Museum in Mexico City and Byblos Art Gallery in Verona, Italy. Recent notable exhibitions include The Florida Prize Exhibition at Orlando Museum of Art in 2019; Relational Undercurrents: Contemporary Art of the Caribbean Archipelago, curated by Tatiana Flores, Museum of Latin American Art (MOLAA); Long Beach, California. The exhibition is part of the Getty's Pacific Standard Time Initiative and was featured at MOLAA from September 16, 2017, through January 2018, which traveled to the Wallach Art Gallery, Columbia University, New York City, during Summer 2018; The Patricia & Philip Frost Art Museum, Florida International University, Miami, Fall 2018; Portland Museum of Art, Portland, Maine, Spring 2019; and the Delaware Art Museum, Wilmington, Delaware, Summer 2019.

== Awards and residencies ==
Major awards include the Guggenheim Fellowship in 2021, a Joan Mitchell Foundation Award in Painting 2006, a Mid-America Arts Alliance/NEA Fellowship Award in Painting, State of Florida Individual Artist Fellowship Award in painting & a Kimbrough Award from the Dallas Museum of Art. Residencies include a Joan Mitchell Center in New Orleans, Skowhegan School of Painting & Sculpture Fellowship, Vermont Studio Center Artists Fellowship, MacDowell (artists' residency and workshop) Milton & Sally Avery Fellowship, Hambidge Fellowship, and as a visiting artist at the Ludwig Foundation in Havana, Cuba.

== Collections ==
Garcia-Roig's works are in the permanent museum collections of:

- Perez Art Museum Miami, FL
- Martin Museum of Art, Waco, TX
- El Paso Museum of Art, TX
- The Grace Museum, TX
- Tyler Museum of Art, TX
- The Ashley Gibson Barnett Museum of Art, Lakeland, FL
- Mexic-Arte Museum, Austin, TX
- International Museum of Art & Science, McAllen, TX
- Austin Museum of Art, TX
- San Angelo Museum of Art, TX
- Art Museum of South Texas, Corpus Christi, TX
- Blanton Museum of Art, Austin, TX
- Arizona State University Art Museum, Tempe, AZ
- Huntsville Museum of Art, Huntsville AL
