= Carlos Betancourt (artist) =

Puerto Rican artist

- Born: 1966 (age 59–60); San Juan, Puerto Rico
- Known for: photography, painting, installation art, performance art
- Website: https://www.carlosbetancourt.com/

Carlos Betancourt (born 1966) is a Puerto Rican artist. A multimedia artist based in Miami, he was an influential artist in that city following his arrival in the region of Wynwood in the 1980s.

Born of Cuban immigrants in San Juan, Betancourt came to America with his family in 1981 when he was 15, settling in Miami. Despite an early pursuit of architecture, he decided to pursue design, working in photography, painting, sculpture, installation, and performance art, among others. He opened a studio and storefront named "Imperfect Utopia" in South Beach which in the 1990s was visited by a number of celebrities. In 1995, he was named by People magazine one of its 50 most beautiful people in the world. By 2002, his works were exhibiting internationally, with a solo exhibition at the Casa Museo Palacio Spínola in the Canary Islands. In 2015, his work was collected in a coffee table book named after his art studio, published by Italian publisher Rizzoli Libri. With a foreword by Richard Blanco, the book explores the first 25 years of Betancourt's career. That same year, in November, he mounted a solo exhibition at the Puerto Rico Museum of Contemporary Art. In 2018, he received a Florida Prize from the Orlando Museum of Art. His work is part of the permanent collection of the National Portrait Gallery of the United States.
