= Rina Banerjee =

American artist and sculptor (born 1963)

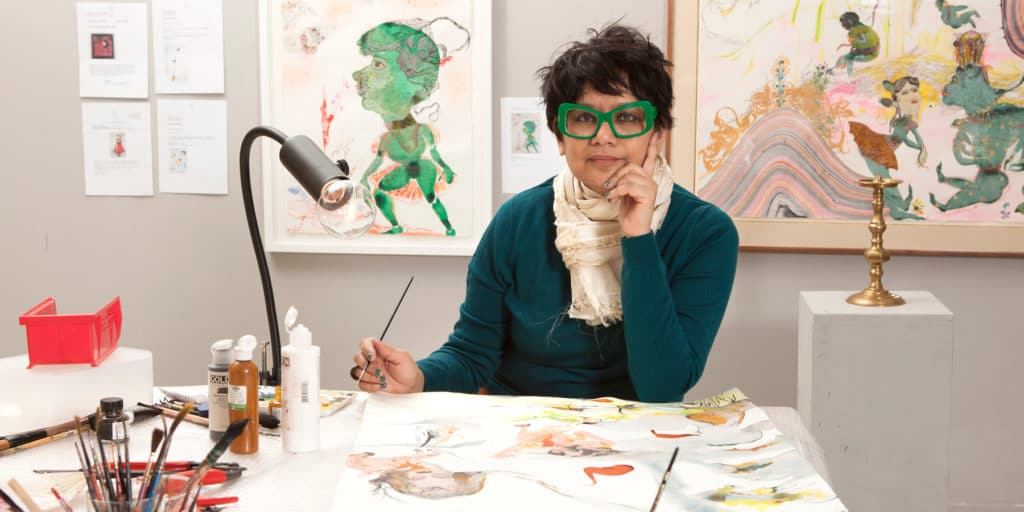
- Born: June 5, 1963 (age 62); Calcutta, West Bengal, India (now Kolkata, West Bengal)
- Website: rinabanerjee.com

Rina Banerjee (born 1963) is an Indian-American artist and sculptor. She currently lives and works in New York City. Her ambitious mid-career survey exhibition, Make Me a Summary of the World––co-organized by and exhibited at the Pennsylvania Academy of the Fine Arts and the San Jose Museum of Art––opened in 2018 and is slated to travel to the Fowler Museum at UCLA, the Frist Art Museum in Nashville, TN, and the Nasher Museum of Art at Duke University, Durham, NC through July 2021.

== Early life and career ==
In 1963, Banerjee was born in a Bengali family in Calcutta (now Kolkata) in the Indian state of West Bengal. She grew up in London, Manchester and Queens, New York, and has lived in the United States ever since. She was previously married to Columbia Professor Sanat Kumar, with whom she had one child, Ananya. She remarried in 2023 to Peggy Reynolds.

Banerjee has mentioned in interviews that the inspiration for her art comes from her childhood memories of visiting her grandfather during his homeopathic treatments. Many of the images and visuals from her visits with her grandfather have stayed with her and can be seen in her art work. She likes her artwork to be not static, but ever changing. She completed an M.F.A. in Painting and Printmaking from Yale School of Art, Yale University in 1995, after graduating from Case Western Reserve University, Ohio with a B.S. in Polymer Engineering. Banerjee's work has been exhibited at the Bronx Museum of the Arts, the Whitney Museum of American Art, and other notable museums.

== Exhibitions ==
Lady of Commerce - wooden. Hers is a transparent beauty, her eager sounds, her infinite and clamorous land and river, ocean and island, earth and sky...all contained, bottled for delivery to open an hole, a commerce so deep while large her arms fool stretched too wide and her sulfurous halo - a ring of glass, metal, stone retire to a sun of fire (2012), National Museum of Women in the Arts, Washington, D.C.

Below is a list of some of Banerjee's solo and group exhibits.

- 1998: Home within a Harem, Colgate University Gallery, NY
- 2000: Auf Weidersehen, Admit One, Chelsea, NY — Banerjee uses Asian and Western materials. The exhibit has plastic tubing that runs along the walls and ending which end with rotten-looking fruit and leaves. The plants in the show represent tropical plants that were taken by western settlers to bring to other countries; some of the plants didn't translate well to other land while some blossomed. The room is also filled with a thick webbing which is meant to represent a digestive system, and within the system colorful ritual powder and spices are captured.
- 2001: Antenna, Bose Pacia Modern, New York
- 2001: Phantasmal Pharmacopeia, Debs & Company, Chelsea, NY
- 2002: Phantasmal Pharmacopeia, curated by Susette Min, Painted Bride Art Center, Philadelphia, PA (catalogue)
- 2006: Fantasies without travel will travel, AMT Gallery, Como, Italy
- 2007: Foreign Fruit, Galerie Nathalie Obadia, Paris
- 2007: "Where the Wild Things Are" ...is no place at all and all places that cannot be lived in but visited, realized out of our careful, playful and tenacious tourism of others, realized as our mobility wanders too far, Galerie Volker Diehl, Berlin (2007)
- 2008: Distant Nearness (with Bharti Kher and Subodh Gupta), Nerman Museum of Contemporary Art, Kansas City, KS
- 2008: Allure, Gallery Espace, New Delhi, India
- 2009: Look into my eyes and you will see a world unexplainable, out of place, Galerie Nathalie Obadia, Brussels
- 2009: Rina Banerjee and Raqib Shaw, Thomas Gibson Ltd., London
- 2010: Forever Foreign, Haunch of Venison, London — Banerjee's first solo show in the UK.
- 2011: Chimeras of India & the West, Musée Guimet, Paris
- 2011: Imagining the other half of the world from here, Galerie Nathalie Obadia, Paris
- 2012: Creationismʼs Kiss, Galerie Nathalie Obadia, Brussels
- 2012: A World of Lies, Galerie Espace, Hong Kong, China
- 2013: Bowerbirdnest, Future Perfect, Singapore
- 2013: A world lost, The Smithsonian Sackler Gallery, Washington, D.C.
- 2013: What am I made of and how do you know my name?, Ota Fine Art, Tokyo
- 2013: Seven Sisters, Jenkins Johnson Gallery, San Francisco, CA
- 2014: Of Men and Worlds, curated by Alain Berland, College des Bernardins, Paris
- 2014: Disgust, L.A. Louver, Venice, CA — Her four sculptures in this show are made from an uncountable number of small objects that are wired and strung together. She uses cowry shells, rooster feathers, gourds, acrylic horns, glass vials, silk, and many other objects. Her sculptures could be either human or animal, still life or moving. It seems as though Banerjee does not look through junk to find materials for her art, but instead will selectively choose what she wants by ordering her materials off of specialty sites. This selective process she uses emphasizes the global culture of her art, and how she has many different pieces from all over the world, all of which form one cohesive work of art.
- 2015: Migrations Breath, OTA Fine Arts, Gillman Barracks, Singapore — Colorful yet suggestive pieces of art, which seem to change with different angles or positions. She uses many objects in her works such as Indian sarees, glass bottles, and seashells. Critics have suggested that some of the names of Banerjee's artwork carry sexual implications. For example, the piece She Drew A Premature Prick and many of the pieces have been suggested to represent reproductive organs. Banerjee has said that she enjoys the way that artwork can be fluid and how one's perspective could change with something so simple as wind blowing.
- 2019: Rina Banerjee: Make Me a Summary of the World, Pennsylvania Academy of the Fine Arts, Philadelphia; Traveling to San Jose Museum of Art, San Jose, CA; Fowler Museum at University of California, Los Angeles, CA; Frist Art Museum, Nashville, TN; Nasher Museum of Art at Duke University, Durham, NC
- 2019: Rina Banerjee: Blemish, Hosfelt Gallery, San Francisco
- 2020: Irresistible Earth, an uncontrollable and unconditional love is bestowed to us upon birth. Love for nature infinitely ripening, delicious and dangerous, their fruits, a fermented and fresh gorgeous beauty..., Galerie Nathalie Obadia, Brussels, Belgium
- 2020: Vapor, Thread, Fire and Earth, between ground and sky Masculine Mythologies and Feminine Escapes, Museum of Contemporary Art (MOCA), Jacksonville, FL
- 2020: Make Me A Summary of the World, Traveling Solo Retrospective: curated by Jodi Throckmorton and Lauren Dickens, Frist Art Museum, Nashville, TN
- 2023: Take Me to the Palace of Love, Syracuse University Art Museum, Syracuse, New York
- 2023-2024: Spirit in the Land, organized by the Nasher Museum of Art at Duke University, North Carolina; traveling to the Pérez Art Museum Miami, Florida.
- 2026: Rina Banerjee: Take me, take me, take me . . . to the Palace of love, Yale Center for British Art, New Haven, Connecticut
