= Glexis Novoa =

Cuban artist (born 1964)

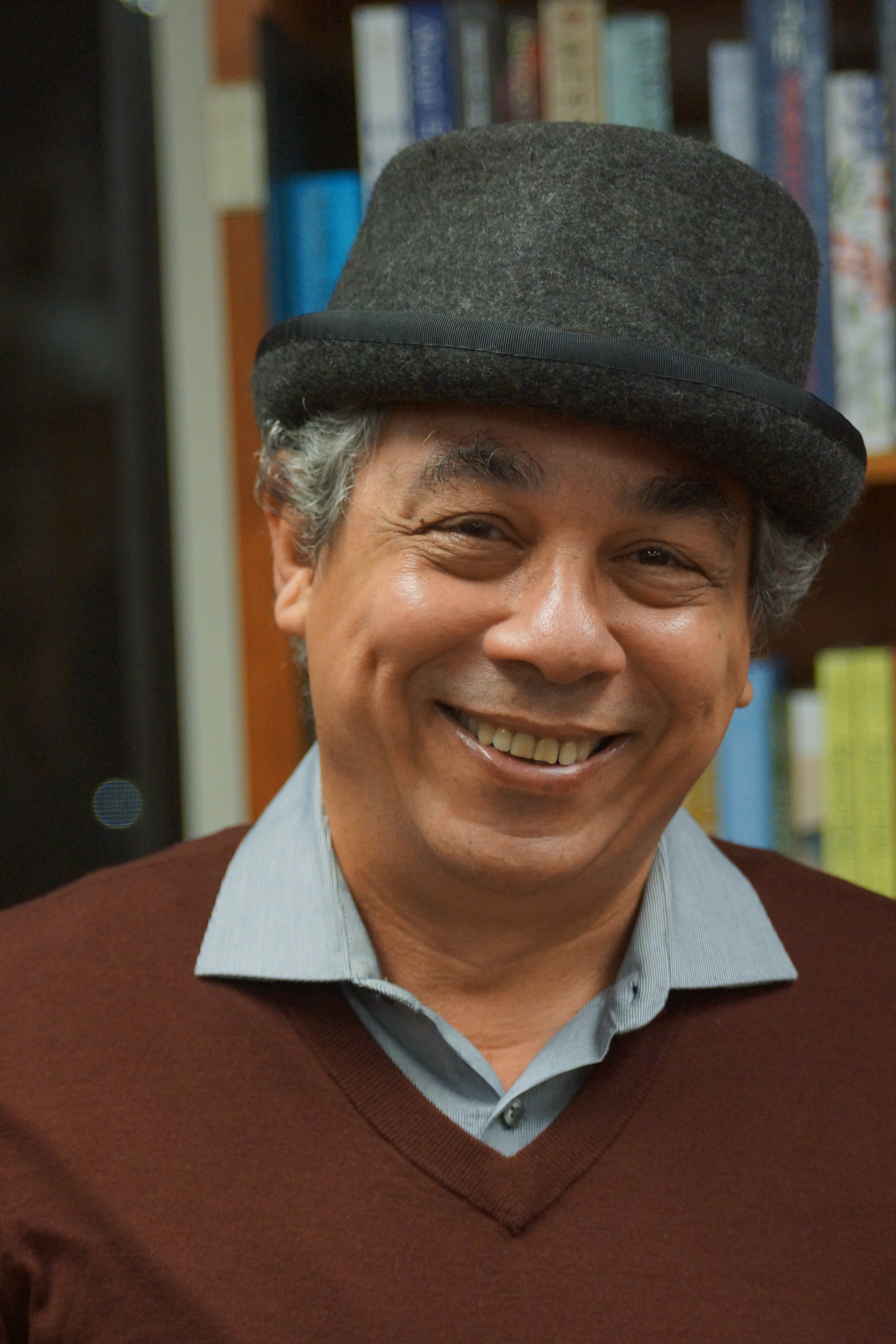
- Novoa at Politics and Prose Bookstore in Silver Spring, MD (2026).
- Born: 1964 (age 61–62); Holguin, Cuba
- Education: National School of Art, Havana
- Known for: Wall drawings, performances, installations
- Notable work: Untitled ‘Practical period’ - III Havana Biennale (1989)
- Movement: Contemporary art
- Awards: Joan Mitchell Painters & Sculptors Grant (2013)
- Website: glexisnovoa.com

Glexis Novoa (born 1964, Holguín, Cuba) is an influential Cuban visual artist and art writer who has been active since the 1980s. Novoa works in a variety of media including graphite wall and marble drawings, paintings, performance, site-specific installations, curatorial practice, and publications to comment on social issues, financial and political systems. Glexis Novoa lives and works in Miami, Florida.

== Early life and education ==
Glexis Novoa was born in 1964 in the Holguín Province, Cuba, where he started his artistic career before relocating to Mexico City in 1993 and later on to Miami in 1995. Novoa belongs to a generation that is often referred to as "the children of the revolution" for being the first group to grow up under the eyes of Fidel Castro's political and cultural regime in Cuba.

He attended the National School of Art, Havana, from 1980 to 1984, and the Skowhegan School of Painting and Sculpture, Maine, in 1998. He has received artistic training from several artmaking workshops and studios at independent art spaces between the 1970s and the 1980s in Cuba. He participated in the arts collective Volume Uno and took part in political performances and interventions in Havana in the 1980s, opening up space to pioneering socially-engaged art forms as a response to Communist ideals at the time.

== Work ==
Glexis Novoa's work combines themes of social history, memory, cultural politics, financial and technological power structures, and urban and natural landscapes in relation to human life, among other disciplines. His signature wall drawings are made of graphite and denote his interest in mark-making and abstraction. For the two bodies of work Etapa Romantica (mid-1980s) and Etapa Práctica (late 1980s to early 1990s), Novoa expands on pictorial investigations about art historical movements and politics such as Constructivism, Expressionism as well as Soviet art and aesthetics. The paintings in these series are large-scale wall installations that often take the gallery space.

His signature graphite wall drawings were on view at Locust Projects, Miami, in 2003. For this Project Room series, Novoa's drawing depicted otherworldly architectural renderings centering on memorialization, social landscapes, and historical narratives.

He exhibited the site-specific work "Worcester drawing," at the Worcester Art Museum, Massachusetts, in 2004. The graphite landscape composition combines natural and imagined architectural elements.

In 2015, the Lowe Art Museum at University of Miami, Florida, organized the solo exhibition Glexis Novoa: Emptiness inspired by Italo Calvino's Invisible Cities. The show consisted of 15 hand-made very small site-specific graphite drawings directly in the museum walls.

His solo exhibition Glexis Novoa: Las cosas como son / Things as They Are at the Museo Nacional de Bellas Artes de La Habana gathered a handful of graphite drawings and a set of eleven sculptures expanding on his investigation about political structures and cultural power through the commemoration and public monuments of figures in likes of Vladimir Lenin, Vladimir Mayakovsky, Vladimir Tatlin, and manifestations of the Worker's Party of Korea in Miami.

His work was included alongside other fifty artists in the public art exhibition Detras del muro, or "Behind the Wall" in English, during the 12th Havana Biennial, Cuba, in 2016. In the fall of 2016, he was an artist-in-residence at the McColl Center for Art + Innovation, in Charlotte, North Carolina.

Novoa was an artist-in-residence at Residency Unlimited, New York, in 2018. He spent his time producing large-scale abstract drawings while interested in the Manhattan architecture, and the New York landscape. His work "Se Vende" was included among the works of ten other artists in the 2018 Orlando Museum of Art Florida Prize in Contemporary Art exhibition and award.

Glexis Novoa: The Cankama Sutta, a solo exhibition at Museum of Art and Design in the Freedom Tower, from Miami Dade College, was presented in 2019. The site-specific wall drawings created for the show established a conversation with themes and concepts in the artist's practice. For instance, the drawings are directly connected with a sculptural body of work produced in Havana in 2015. For the artist, the Buddhist concept of Cankama Sutta relates to the immigrant experience through its walking meditation origin.

The Pérez Art Museum Miami displayed Glexis Novoa's artwork in its galleries for the 2023–2024 rehang of their collections. The large-scale sculpture Untitled ‘Practical period’ | III Havana Biennale from 1989 – the year of the collapse of the Eastern Block – and made of oil on paper, wood & canvas, wooden structure contemplates symbols and visual elements of socialist discourse and connections with Cuban history.

=== Collections (selections) ===
Glexis Novoa's artworks are included in the collections of art institutions in the likes of Pérez Art Museum Miami, Florida; Lowe Art Museum at University of Miami, Florida; Museum of Fine Arts, Houston, Texas; Centre de Cultura Contemporania de Barcelona, Spain; and the Wifredo Lam Centre for Contemporary Art in Havana, Cuba.

== Awards and recognition ==
Novoa was the 2020 Creator Award Winner from Oolite Arts, Miami. He has received a Joan Mitchell Center Residency, in 2015 and a Joan Mitchell Painters & Sculptors Grant, in 2013, Cisneros Fontanals Art Foundation Grants (2012). He is the recipient of a Cintas Foundation Emilio Sánchez Award in Art (2006–2007), and was selected Miami's Best Local Artist in 2001 by The Miami New Times.
