= Terry Rodgers =

American artist (born 1947)

- Born: September 11, 1947 (age 78); Newark, New Jersey
- Education: Amherst College
- Known for: Painting
- Movement: Figurative art

Terry Rodgers (born September 11, 1947) is an American artist known for his large scale canvases that focus on portraying contemporary body politics. He was born in Newark, New Jersey and raised in Washington, D.C., He graduated cum laude from Amherst College in Massachusetts in 1969, with a major in Fine Arts. His strong interest in film and photography influenced his style in the direction of representational realism in art.

In 2005, three of his monumental figurative canvases were presented at the Valencia Biennial. Abroad he has had solo exhibitions in galleries in Brussels, Amsterdam, Zurich and Milan, and participated in group shows around the world. In the United States, he has had solo gallery exhibitions in New York City, Los Angeles, Atlanta, and Chicago.

He has also exhibited at numerous museums in the US including the Museum of Contemporary Art Jacksonville, the Erie Art Museum and the Mobile Museum of Art. Abroad, his work has been exhibited at the Stedelijk Museum – 's-Hertogenbosch, the Kunsthalle der Hypo-Kulturstiftung in Munich, the Museum Franz Gertsch in Burgdorf, the Museum Folkwang in Essen, the Gemeentemuseum Helmond, the Scheringa Museum of Realist Art in Spanbroek, the Kunsthal Rotterdam, the Kunsthalle Emden, the Kunsthalle Krems, the Galerie Rudolfinum and the Zentrum Paul Klee in Bern.

Photograph of Terry Rodgers in his studio with painting: What Shall We Do Now That We Are Happy? (unfinished state)

== Critical response ==
Terry Rodgers is a realist known for his contemporary character studies. While his earlier paintings often contemplated personal and family relationships in brightly lit outdoor settings wrought with pale, intense, high-keyed colors, his recent paintings conjure up a vision of the private nightlife of America's privileged youth. Widely exhibited in the U.S. and Europe and noted for their subtle social commentary. Rodgers’ complex compositions emphasize the detachment of his characters: the eye can trace the angles and curves of their intersecting bodies on the painting’s surface, but their gazes almost all diverge from each other. They seem to share the disappointment of F. Scott Fitzgerald's hollow glamour seekers and the bourgeois ennui mined by Eric Fischl and David Salle.

Cutting edge art and the figurative is again avant-garde in the paintings by Terry Rodgers. The viewer is at the same time a voyeur and a guest at the party, but an existential calm reigns in the paintings. Rodgers is a master of composition. His strange parties are, despite all their photographic qualities, put together like a painting by Rubens.

His characters are often depicted with a sense of troubled insouciance. Despite settings that suggest a fantasy of hedonistic living—emphasized through fashion, physical appearance, and scenes of indulgent social gatherings—they are portrayed as fragile and psychologically complex.
