= Ted Mineo =

American artist

Ted Mineo (born 1981 in New Orleans, Louisiana) is an American artist. He is based in New York City.

== About ==
Ted Mineo grew up in Marrero, Louisiana, a small town near New Orleans. He attended the Maryland Institute College of Art in Baltimore, Maryland, earning a Bachelor of Fine Arts degree in 2002. He then began graduate work at Yale University in the School of Art at age 21, earning a Master of Fine Arts degree in 2004. His works have been exhibited in Miami Beach, Florida, and at an art museum in Chelsea, Manhattan. Mineo exhibits with Deitch Projects in SoHo, New York.
