= Kenya (Robinson) =

American multimedia artist (born 1977)

- Born: 1977 (age 48–49); Landstuhl, Germany
- Education: Los Angeles Trade Technical College Yale University Skowhegan School of Painting and Sculpture
- Known for: Visual art, installation art, sculpture, performance

Kenya (Robinson) (born 1977) is an American multimedia artist whose work includes performance, sculpture and installation. Raised in Gainesville, Florida, (Robinson)'s work depicts themes of privilege and consumerism, exploring perceptions of gender, race and ability. Combining a variety of audio-visual elements and live performance, (Robinson)'s work has been shown at the Museum of Modern Art, The Kitchen, The Museum of Contemporary African Diasporan Arts, and the 60 Wall Street Gallery of Deutsche Bank. She has lectured at Hampshire College, Long Island University, and the University of Florida.

An established blogger and Arts and Culture contributor to the Huffington Post, (Robinson), who chooses to have her last name placed in parentheses, documents her work on her Instagram account kenya9. She earned her MFA in Sculpture from the School of Art at Yale University in 2013.

== Early life and education ==
Born in Landstuhl, Germany, in 1977, (Robinson) grew up and attended schools in Gainesville, Florida, including Lincoln Middle School, Gainesville High School and the University of Florida. Her father worked in the military and (Robinson) has described her mother as being a "great beauty and bibliophile."

In 2001, (Robinson) enrolled in the apparel design and production program at Los Angeles Trade-Technical College where she earned an associate degree. After working for a few years as a freelance fashion designer in both Los Angeles and New York, (Robinson) began working as a studio assistant for visual artist Mike Cloud. In 2009, (Robinson) began the Lower Manhattan Cultural Council's WorkSpace Residency, allowing her to focus on her burgeoning multi-media artistic practice. It is also during this time that she started her blog, which has documented her life and work from 2009 to present. In 2011, despite not having a bachelor's degree, (Robinson) began her Master of Fine Arts in Sculpture at Yale University in New Haven, Connecticut. The artist has had this to say of her decision to attend the Ivy League institution:

A part of my attraction to Yale, beyond the art program, is that it is a place of privilege. Particularly male, white, western privilege. As a black person living in this country, that fascinates me. I wanted this environment to influence my thinking— everything that could be challenged was challenged: my gender, my sexual orientation, my race, class, and even my age. I feel like I've thought more deeply about those aspects of myself in ways I hadn't before.

(Robinson)'s mother died during her first month of her MFA at Yale, an event which the artist states greatly influenced her time there.

In 2011 (Robinson) was the subject of the short form documentary "I Have The Right" by Jenny Lam.

== Works ==
=== 2008-2010 ===
From her earliest major pieces, (Robinson) engaged with a variety of mediums and subjects. In 2008, the Museum of Contemporary African Diaspora Arts in Brooklyn, NY, featured her work in a solo exhibition, entitled "HAIRPOLITIC: The Pursuit of Nappiness'. The exhibition, in exploring contemporary perspectives on hair, "addressed the unwritten rules and politics of culture and how they affect what we consider beautiful." Two years later, (Robinson) produced a variation of HAIRPOLITIC as a solo exhibition at the Thomas Center in her hometown of Gainesville. This exhibition, "HAIRPOLITIC: Pomade in America," featured some work from her earlier exhibit, but also incorporated new multimedia.

In addition to these solo displays, (Robinson)'s work appeared in a number of group exhibitions during this time in New York and New Jersey. She also had a number of performance art pieces featured in notable venues, including the Museum of Modern Art, the Wall Street Gallery, Recess Activities, and the Museum of Contemporary African Diaspora Arts.

=== 2011-2012 ===
In 2011, (Robinson)'s work was featured in a third solo exhibition at a branch of the Brooklyn Public Library, entitled "All Over the Place." While her visual work was also featured in a number of group exhibitions in New York, 2011 and 2012 saw (Robinson) engage in an increasing number of major performance art pieces.

Her work,"kenya eats a cracker," at the Kitchen, featured the artist eating a variety of cracker brands in a yellow raincoat. Her piece prompted praise from at least one critic. Andrew Russeth wrote that "(Robinson) seems wonderfully out of touch with the times," by ignoring the trend among performance artists to showcase the "glorification of long-term suffering ... or the celebration of middlebrow interactivity." Russeth went on to write that (Robinson) "twists the codes that govern our basic needs — shelter and food — in ambiguous ways and pushes them toward the precarious point when they may break."

==== The Inflatable Mattress ====
From February 1 - May 3, 2011, (Robinson) conducted a "13-week-long performance piece, in which she offered herself up as a guest (10 hours of housework included, but the host must supply the toothpaste) to anyone who would have her." Robinson traveled with an inflatable mattress as well as "appropriate linens and towels." Her proposal was sent out by e-mail to artist colleagues in Manhattan and Brooklyn.

(Robinson) documented her interactions with her hosts and her reflections on the experience on a blog, including movie recommendations, required readings, and a log of the toothpaste used at each residence.

The project was detailed by The New York Times in the piece "The Serial Sleepover Artist," by Penelope Green.

=== 2013-present ===
Recent years have seen (Robinson)'s work continue to be featured in exhibitions in New York City, but her performative work has also taken her to other parts of the country, including Maine, Nebraska and the US Virgin Islands.

Her sculpture "Commemorative Headdress of Her Journey Beyond Heaven" is in the permanent collection of the Smithsonian National Museum of African American History and Culture.

An installation of several works won the 2018 Florida Prize in Contemporary Art at the Orlando Museum of Art. Alex Rich wrote "Kenya's work is important. It takes a novel and memorable approach to the perennial, historical, and — sadly even here in 2018 — still too relevant theme of white straight male privilege. Any viewer who takes the time to engage with her work will be left reconceptualizing his or her own place in that hierarchy of gender and race and in the fitful journey toward inclusiveness."

==== CHEEKY LaSHAE ====
CHEEKY LaSHAE, described as a "fluid-identity karaoke singer," is a performance art piece which (Robinson) began in 2013 following the completion of her MFA. A reaction to the feeling of being "forced into a box" by her education, CHEEKY consists of a costume, worn by both (Robinson) and rotating audience members, in which one's face is entirely masked by a box like shape that leaves only the lower half of the body uncovered. CHEEKY's emphasis on audience participation in her "Karaoke Universal" shows stems from (Robinson)'s belief that "everyone, even the spotlight-phobic, is a performer." "Whether you're performing femininity, masculinity, shyness, or extroversion, all of our movements in a social space are performative in nature, whether you're a performance artist or not," (Robinson) states.

(Robinson) is currently experimenting with projection mapping onto CHEEKY LaSHAE's costume during performance.

==== The #WHITEMANINMYPOCKET project ====
#WHITEMANINMYPOCKET, a project that began in 2013, is a work in which (Robinson) carries around a small figurine of a white male in her pocket with the goal of reminding herself: "you are more privileged than you think, no matter your gender, socioeconomic status or the color of your skin." When (Robinson) began the project, the white man figurine lived publicly online through her Instagram account with a hashtag and series of photos that document its daily goings-on. As interest in the project has grown, (Robinson) has begun making a "tiny army of pocket-sized white men" figurines, which she often refers to as "talismen" and "charms."

Kenya spoke about the piece to the Huffington Post in 2015, stating that: "As someone who strongly identifies as a black, American person, all of the violence inflicted upon black bodies -- verbally, emotionally, physically, spiritually -- it's really overwhelming. I needed something. I needed to create privilege for myself because every message that I was receiving told me I wasn't privileged at all. But, you know what? I am breathing. I am able to express myself in a positive way. That is a big privilege, but sometimes I forget that."

== Awards and residencies ==
- 2018 Florida Prize in Contemporary Art
- 2015 Creative Capital 'On Our Radar' (March – September 2015) Award, Triangle Arts Residency, Fountainhead Residency
- 2014 Bemis Center for Contemporary Art Residency
- 2011-2013 ANALOG: Recess Activities, Inc., Online Residency, Smack Mellon 'Hot Picks' Artist Award.
- 2009- 2010 Visiting Artist, Harvestworks, WorkSpace Residency, Lower Manhattan Cultural Council, Triangle Arts Workshop Residency
