= José Daniel Santibáñez =

José Daniel Santibáñez or JD Santibáñez (Guayaquil, 1959) is an Ecuadorian science fiction novelist and comic book writer.

Santibáñez is the author of the novels Ejecútese el mañana (2001; Execute Tomorrow), and El mago (2003; The Magician). His book Cómic Book (2008; Comic Book) is a book containing 27 graphic stories of science fiction and crime.

Santibáñez studied Illustration at Parsons School of Design in New York. He is currently a professor at the Escuela Superior Politécnica del Litoral (ESPOL), Universidad Santa María (USM) and Universidad de Especialidades Espíritu Santo (UEES).

== Works ==
Novels

- Ejecútese el mañana (2001)
- El mago (2003)

Comic books

- Ecuador Ninja
- El Gato
- Guayaquil de mis temores
- Cómic Book
