= Amer Kobaslija =

Bosnian-American painter

Amer Kobaslija is a Bosnian-American painter.

He was born in Banja Luka, Yugoslavia in 1975. He left Bosnia in 1993, then spent time in a German refugee camp. In 1997 he immigrated to Jacksonville, Florida. He received an MFA degree in painting from Montclair State University.

In 2012 he executed a series of paintings dealing with the destruction wrought by the 2011 Japanese Tsunami.

He was a 2019 nominee for the Orlando Museum of Art's 2019 Florida Prize in Contemporary Art. Kobaslija was a 2013 Guggenheim fellow. Kobaslija is an assistant professor of art at University of Central Florida.
