= Elliott Jerome Brown Jr. =

American artist and photographer

Elliott Jerome Brown Jr. (born 1993) is a queer black American artist and photographer. In 2019 they received an Emerging Visual Arts Grant by The Rema Hort Mann Foundation.

== Early life and education ==
In 2017, Brown graduated with a BFA from New York University at the Tisch School of Arts. They also attended the Skowhegan School of Painting and Sculpture in 2017.

== Work ==
Brown's work is inspired by Deana Lawson, Carrie Mae Weems, and Lorna Simpson. Their work started with a focus on self portraiture to examine the complexities of gender and identity. Brown's work speaks to the black queer body by using the intimacy of portraiture as a means to question preconceived notions of maleness and blackness.

Brown has been commissioned by media outlets and fashion designers, including New York Magazine, Gayletter Magazine, The New Yorker, Vice, Teen Vogue, Dazed, W Magazine, and Telfar Clemens. Their work has been featured by W Magazine, Vice, and The Fader.

In 2017, Brown co-curated the seventh annual "Zine and Self-Published Photo Book Fair" with Devin N. Morris, titled Rock Paper Scissors and a Three-Armed Shovel.

== Exhibitions ==
=== Solo exhibitions ===
- Arms to pray with, Nicelle Beauchene Gallery, New York City, 2019

=== Group exhibitions ===
- Stranger Thing, Outpost Artists Resources, Ridgewood, NY, 2017
- Four, Sargents' Daughters, New York City, 2018
- Daybreak: New Affirmations in Queer Photography, Leslie-Lohman Museum of Gay and Lesbian Art, New York City, 2018
- Do You Love Me?, P.P.O.W., New York City, 2019
- On Refusal: Representation & Resistance in Contemporary American Art, The Mac, Belfast, Northern Ireland, 2019
- Quiver of Voices, LTD Los Angeles, online exhibition, 2020
- Mien, TRNK, online exhibition, 2020
