= Katia Santibañez =

French abstract artist

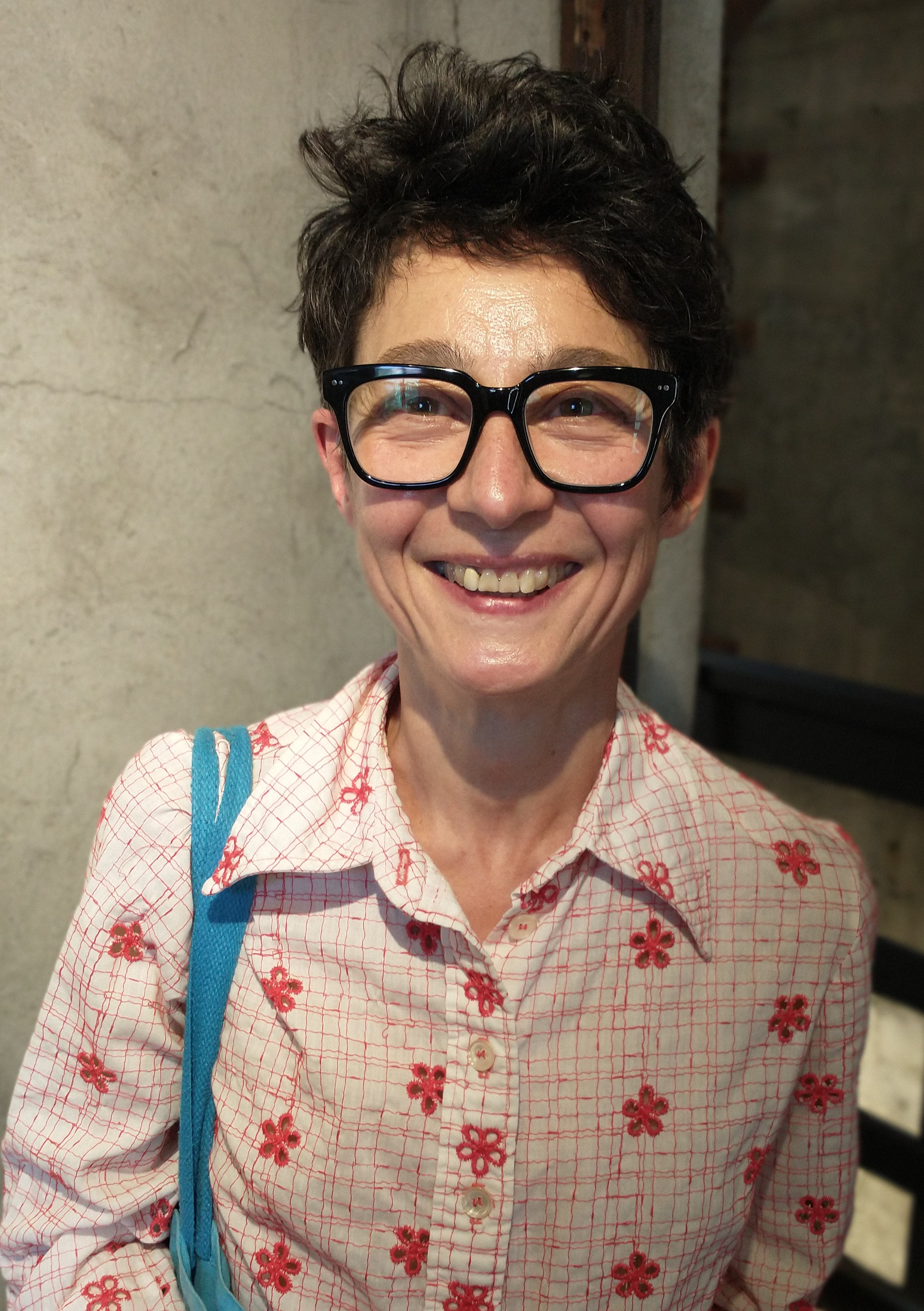
- Born: May 17, 1964 (age 62); Paris, France
- Education: Ecole Nationale Superieure des Beaux Arts (1985-1990)
- Movement: Abstract pattern-based art
- Spouse: James Siena
- Awards: Pollock-Krasner Foundation Award (2021)

Katia Santibañez (born May 17, 1964 in Paris) is a French-American multidisciplinary abstract artist who works in painting, video, drawing, printmaking and photography. Her work has been associated with a "generation of pattern-obsessed New York artists" according to Raphael Rubinstein writing in Art News. Some of her paintings were acquired by her friend James H. Duffy who donated his collections to the Munson-Williams-Proctor Arts Institute museum in Utica, New York. She has exhibited widely since 1998 and her work is in both private and public collections.

Reviewer Deborah Garwood in Art Critical magazine wrote that Santibañez often organizes her paintings on a "picture plane into a series of rectilinear compartments" to suggest "fur, grass, or other organic forms", and that her "mesmerizing techniques have great reserves of wit and conceptual depth." Critic Holly Myers writing in the Los Angeles Times expressed a similar sentiment, adding that her work builds on several basic motifs, such as "grids, stripes and rows of jagged, grass-like tendrils", and that some of her paintings are "vividly seductive and sensual." Reviewer Nectar Knuckles writing in ARTnews magazine described her art as structuring "natural phenomena into the kaleidoscopic worlds she creates in her abstract paintings". Keith Shaw writing in the Berkshire Edge suggested that her patterns "subtly express natural form and intellectual design."

Santibañez was born in 1964 in Paris, France, studied microbiology and biochemistry before attending Beaux-Arts de Paris from 1985 to 1990, then moved to New York City. She has a studio in New York City as well as in the Berkshires town of Otis, Massachusetts, with her husband and fellow artist, James Siena.
