= Shervone Neckles =

American artist, educator and community worker (born 1979)

- Born: 1979 (age 46–47); Huntington, New York, U. S.
- Known for: Printmaking, textiles, book arts, sculpture, installation, and social investigations
- Awards: Pollock-Krasner Foundation, The Queens Council on the Arts, Foundation of Contemporary Art, Puffin Foundation, Joan Mitchell Foundation
- Website: shervoneneckles.com

Shervone Neckles (born 1979) is an interdisciplinary artist, educator, and community worker. Her work draws inspiration from the duality and transitional nature of her Afro-Grenadian-American identity. Neckles’ practice combines mixed media techniques of printmaking, textiles, book arts, sculpture, installation, and social investigations to further explore concepts of past and present-day colonialism, notions of provenance as it relates to origin, authorship and ownership.

== Life and education ==
Neckles was born in 1979 in Huntington, New York to parents of Grenadian descent and raised in East Flatbush, Brooklyn, New York. She has earned an MA from Teacher's College, Columbia University, MFA from Queens College and BFA from The College of New Rochelle.

== Work ==
Neckles’ practice takes an interdisciplinary approach. Grenadian folklore, Afro-Caribbean diasporic storytelling, to West African philosophy inform the ways in which ideas on womanhood, matriarchy, spirituality, astrophysics, memory, to home, fuse in her work. By using mixed media techniques of printmaking, assemblage, collage, textiles and embroidery that are rooted in her Afro-Caribbean practices and traditions, she forms a connection, continues a tradition, preserves memories, and inserts herself and her ancestors into history.

In 2004, she developed the Red Rag Rosie character, a young black girl rendered in silhouette from whose perspective the viewer follows from childhood to motherhood. She created this character to fill a void—frustrated by the lack of positive representations of herself in children's literature. Neckles’ inspiration for Red Rag Rosie was inspired by the Grenadian masquerade tradition known as Jab Jab—where masqueraders cover themselves in molasses, burnt cane, or black grease, as a display of racial pride, and march through the streets during Jouvet morning Carnival festivities with chains, ropes, and serpents. A folkloric tradition that references historic acts of resistance demonstrated by the enslaved, indentured workers and others oppressed in the Caribbean. Her solo exhibition Give and Take, exhibited at Space Gallery (Portland) in 2016, featured Red Rag Rosie and investigated the social meaning of beauty, identity, and cultural authenticity within black womanhood. In 2017, Neckles’ work was presented as part of the group exhibition Race and Revolution: Still Separate - Still Unequal at Smack Mellon (New York). Her work Primary I (2004) is described by writer Seph Rodney as a small black puppet, a combination of a jigaboo figure and a faceless S&M character, with a horn extending out from the back of its head—a caricature of how some see black children through racist and fetishistic lenses.

For her solo exhibition Provenance at Five Myles Gallery in 2019, Neckles exhibited print series featuring a liminal figure maneuvering through space with a house structure worn as a mask / headdress. The house structure was a replication of the artist's maternal family home in Grenada, West Indies. Using mixed media techniques of collage and embroidery, the artist explored concepts of past and present-day colonialism, and notions of provenance as it relates to origin, authorship, and ownership. The writer Seph Rodney noted in his review for Hyperallergic that: “These representations of the bodies of Black women attest to their audiences that this body is fey, incalculable, and thus must be seen and can only be intimately understood through the language of myth and poetry.”

These figures were also the protagonists of Neckles’ presentation at the 58th Venice Biennial’s Grenada Pavilion. This presentation featured her memories about the immigration of her family from Grenada to Brooklyn, New York in the 1960s and 70s. Many of the materials of the installation spoke to impermanence—as the art itself over time degraded and disappeared.

In her earlier work, Neckles produced artist books on political themes such as the 1983 American invasion of Grenada (Operation Urgent Fury); the threatening sensation of a computer cursor placed over the image of a soldier (A Soldier’s Story); and Thread-n-tru; among others. In the 6@30 exhibition catalog, published by Flushing Town Hall, the writer E.A.Durden noted: “Neckles reminds us that the events we allow to happen and the stories we choose to tell, versus those we choose to deny create layers of our present moment and our future as well.”

== Collaborative projects ==
Creative Wellness Gathering Station is an interactive art piece where Neckles occasionally sets up her cart in areas like her neighborhood in Jamaica, Queens and invites the public to create their own loose herbal tea blends for free. The cart is filled with jars of loose herbs, including: nettle root, hibiscus flower, and dried carrot, reminiscent of healing remedies from her childhood in a Caribbean household in Brooklyn.

Presented in partnership with Beam Center (New York City), BEACON (2020) is a temporary public installation inspired by American inventor Lewis H. Latimer, his 1881 patent for the electric lamp, and 1882 patent for processing carbon filament in the incandescent light bulb. The landmark status of Lewis H. Latimer House and Museum also served as an inspiration for the artist's Beacon Shade Sail Installation (2019). This installation affirms the Museum's sense of place and belonging within the Flushing and greater Queens community and honors the lifework of humanitarian Lewis H. Latimer.

Neckles’ practice also includes curatorial projects, including Amplify Action: Sustainability through the Arts at Pratt Center for Community Development and Bedford-Stuyvesant Restoration Corporation (New York) and From Taboo to Icon: Africanist Turnabout at Ice Box Galley (Philadelphia).

== Awards, fellowships, and residencies ==
Previous awards include grants from Pollock-Krasner Foundation, The Queens Council on the Arts, Foundation of Contemporary Art, Puffin Foundation, Joan Mitchell Foundation, and fellowships from Robert Blackburn Printmaking Workshop and Manhattan

Graphic Center. She has participated in residencies as diverse as the Youlou Arts Foundation in St. Vincent and the Grenadines, Wisconsin; Robert Rauschenberg Foundation, Florida; The Elizabeth Foundation's SHIFT Program, New York; Wave Hill, New York; The Center for Book Arts, New York; The Skowhegan School of Painting and Sculpture, Maine among many other residency programs.

== Selected exhibitions ==
Neckles had solo exhibitions at Five Myles Gallery (Brooklyn, New York); Space Gallery (Portland, Maine); Pratt Institute (Brooklyn, New York); and participated in group exhibitions at the National Pavilion of Grenada at the 58th Venice Biennale (Venice, Italy), Edward Hopper Museum (Nyack, NY); The Colored Girls Museum (Philadelphia, Pennsylvania); Redland Museum (Cleveland Queensland, Australia); Museum of Printing History (Houston, Texas); The Aldrich Contemporary Art Museum (Ridgefield, Connecticut); among others. Her public art commissions were presented at Beam Center (Brooklyn, New York) and The Lewis H. Latimer House Museum (Flushing, New York).

== Collections ==
Neckles' work is held in many private and public collections, including The Schomburg Center for Research in Black Culture, New York Public Library.

== Critical reception ==
In his review for Hyperallergic, the writer Seph Rodney describes Neckles’ work: “All the work in this show is beautiful. I can see why Neckles was chosen (along with four other artists) to represent Grenada at the Venice Biennale. It is enough to know that like Neckles’s figures I won’t be able to divest myself of the house I grew up in. I will have to find ways to keep it balanced on my shoulders.”

In her catalog essay E.A. Durden notes: “When Shervone Neckles picks through piles of cast-off upholstery, she sees not only what is, but also what could be. She makes a small doll, dark and featureless, like a silhouette, sitting at a miniature school desk fashioned out of scrap wood, reading Dick and Jane wondering where she fits in this whitewashed world.”

In Jamaica Flux, Bushra Rehman writes: ““Ever since Neckles and I began to speak about her Creative Wellness Gatherings, I have been thinking of illness as a consequence of the oppressions we face as people of color in this country, and at the same the very real restraints of physical pain, which keeps us trapped in our patterns of hurt. On this day, I witnessed Neckles short circuit this cycle.”
