= Nakeya Brown =

African-American conceptual photographer

Nakeya Brown (born 1988) is an African-American conceptual photographer. She often uses hair to explore themes of Black womanhood and beauty. In Time, Alexandra Genova writes "Through her confrontational images centered around beauty and hair care, Brown holds up a mirror to herself and to society, questioning the accepted rules for femininity and showing why they should be broken." She has been featured in numerous solo and group exhibitions.

== Education ==
Brown received her undergraduate degree in Visual Arts and Journalism & Media Studies from Rutgers University in New Jersey where she first became interested in documenting and exploring African American experiences. She received her MFA from George Washington University.

== Career ==
Brown is "known for her interpretation of the politics of black hair, examining how it relates to culture and identity." She "uses photography to extract and redefine symbols of femininity. Her practice centers around black female subjectivity, black beauty, and often uses hair as an apparatus to identity facets of womanhood."

Nakeya Brown had her first solo show opening in 2017 at Blue Sky Gallery in Portland called Between Sheets and Seamless where she pulled images from several of her photo series such as If Nostalgia Were Colored Brown ("reverent tableaux of vintage album covers and objects used for beautification to pay homage to a history of black feminine spaces of self care"), Hair Stories Untold ("explores her own family’s hair rituals through conceptual portraiture and still life"), Gestures of My Bio-Myth, The Refutation of “Good” Hair, Facade Objects, and Mass Production Comes Home (where Brown "photographed mass-produced personal objects of the past in front of vintage floral wallpaper, drawing attention to the relationship between these products of assembly-line labor and their final homes within the domestic sphere, historically a site of women’s paid and unpaid labor in addition to self-care").

Also in 2017, Brown had a solo show in Chicago at Catherine Edelman Gallery titled Ctrl+P: Photography taken offline.

Brown has been in several other two-person and group shows including one at Hamiltonian Gallery in D.C. in 2017 titled Some Assembly Required alongside artist Christie Neptune. For this exhibition, Brown used "arranged still-life photographs and images culled from her family photo archive" to contrast images of mass production and labor by women with photos of her grandmother from the same time period.

She was awarded the 2017 Snider Prize by the Museum of Contemporary Photography in Chicago.
