= Pamela Longobardi =

American contemporary artist and ecofeminist

- Born: 1958 (age 67–68); Glen Ridge, New Jersey
- Education: University of Georgia (BFA); Montana State University (MFA)
- Known for: eco art, conceptual art, painting, installation, sculpture, plastic pollution, art activism
- Years active: 2004–present

Pam Longobardi (born 1958) is an American contemporary artist and ecofeminist, currently living and working in Atlanta, Georgia. She is known internationally for sculptural works and installations created from plastic debris, primarily from marine and coastal environments, as a primary material. Much of her work includes community-based research, such as carbon or plastic audits, as well as collaborative art creation.

== Early life and education ==
Pam Longobardi grew up in New Jersey, the child of an ocean lifeguard and a Delaware state diving champion, and credits her parents' relationship to the water with her own scientific and artistic interests. Longobardi moved to Atlanta in 1970, and completed her B.F.A. at University of Georgia in 1981. She received a B.S. in Science Education from Montana State University in 1982. Longobardi then went on to earn her M.F.A. degree, also from Montana State University in 1985.

== Career ==
The entanglement of science and art is central to Longobardi's practice and aesthetic. She explains that "I see some aspects of the methodology of the artist and scientist as very similar: long periods of intensive research, immersion in materials to better understand their properties, inquisitiveness and curiosity as driving forces, a desire to unpack ‘reality’ to better understand our relationship to it."

=== The Drifters Project ===
After discovering mountains of plastic being thrown up out of the ocean on a remote Hawaiian island in 2006, Longobardi established the Drifters Project. Begun initially as a solo endeavor, The Drifters Project has expanded over 20 years to become a global collaborative with local communities and diverse volunteers, removing tens of thousands of pounds of plastic pollution and resituating it in public space. Longobardi has worked with citizens from coastal regions in places such as the island of Lesvos in Greece, Armila, Panama, Palau and Indonesia, among other locations.

In addition to environmental remediation and education, artwork is always the final result. One iteration of The Drifters Project was displayed at the 2009 Venice Biennale, in a special project with the Franciscan monks of San Francesco del Deserto.

In 2010, Edizione Charta (Milan, NY) produced a photo-essay book entitled Drifters: Plastics, Pollution, Personhood that included photographs and essays by Longobardi and three other writers.

In an interview with Celina Jeffery for Drain Magazine, Longobardi describes plastic as a “cultural archeology of our time,” stating that: "All these things collapse for me in the drifting ocean plastic object: it IS an artifact of my specific human evolutionary time; it IS made from petroleum that is the fossil sunlight and ancient plants, animals and yes, dinosaurs, that roamed the past Earth; it IS a biological raft for invasive creatures; it IS a toxic floating time bomb that is changing the human and animal body and the very ocean itself; and it IS a future fossil of the Anthropocene."

Art critic Sarah Rose Sharp writes that “The forensic examination of plastics in Longobardi’s work has particular resonance in the context of popular interest in true crime. Stories of horrific murders can always find a voracious audience, but an environmental threat which could ultimately be history’s greatest serial killer is somehow less sensational or interesting.”

Another aspect of the Drifters Project raises awareness about the extremity of the experiences endured by refugees. Longobardi explains that the climate crisis and refugee crisis are intertwined, and saw evidence of this while working in Lesvos, Greece, where she collaborated with Syrian refugees and other multi-national climate migrants.

Longobardi worked with refugees and Greek citizens on Lesvos to collect discarded life vests, which washed ashore as a result of more than 500,000 asylum seekers arriving on the island. The collected life jackets were woven together to form large flag-like compositions, which Longobardi has also used in guerilla performances that echo semaphore–visual signals used by the Navy.

=== Plastic Free Island ===
In 2014, Longobardi established Plastic Free Island in collaboration with Plastic Pollution Coalition. The initiative seeks to keep plastic waste from the beaches of Kefalonia, Greece, and provide a template for other island communities to manage and reduce the impact of plastic pollution. The project was filmed and released in a short documentary film titled Plastic Free Island Kefalonia that premiered at the Oceanographic Museum in Monaco.

=== GYRE Expedition ===
In 2013 Longobardi was selected to be lead artist in the GYRE Expedition, an art-science research expedition that assembled a team of notable marine scientists, journalists, filmmakers and artists to trawl remote Alaskan coastlines and to document collaboratively the impacts of plastic pollution on these delicate ecosystems. Her colleagues on the expedition included chief exhibition scientist Carl Safina, artist Mark Dion, filmmaker J.J. Kelly, photographer Andy Hughes, and others: all of these are featured, along with Longobardi, in a twenty-minute National Geographic film, GYRE, which aired in 2013. Of Longobardi, Dion says "Her knowledge of the subject and commitment is extraordinary."

== Artwork ==
Longobardi’s multidisciplinary art practice focuses on raising collective consciousness around the environmental crisis of marine plastic pollution. Through her Drifters Project, she explores international bodies of water and combs beaches and shorelines for plastic debris that has ended up in global waterways. She incorporates these materials into large-scale assemblages and installations.

Longobardi also produces paintings with an elemental aesthetic, incorporating natural processes such as chemical patinas that crystallize; light-sensitive photo imaging, magnetism, mirror reflection, after-image, and phosphorescence. She uses unconventional painting materials, including sulfurated potash and sodium chloride, and pours and wipes different mixtures of these substances over surfaces like copper to make otherworldly landscapes that envision a future natural environment with a lessoned human footprint. A suite of four paintings on copper created in 2014, called Anthropocene, incorporate an earth-based palette and include intricate details such as minute human figures who appear engulfed within vast landscapes of caves, crevices, and craters. The title of the series refers to the ongoing epoch of human activities that are distinctly impacting the environment.

== Exhibitions ==
Longobardi’s artistic outcomes of the GYRE expedition in 2013 were presented in the exhibition, Gyre: The Plastic Ocean, at the Anchorage Museum at Rasmuson Center in Anchorage, Alaska, a show which later travelled to the CDC's Museum in Atlanta, Georgia and other museums across the U.S. Longobardi's contributions to the exhibition include Economies of Scale and Bounty, Pilfered; both artworks are characteristic of her sculptural found-plastic installations.

Longobardi’s artwork has been the subject of numerous solo and two-person exhibitions, including Anxiety of Appetites, curated by Karen Comer-Lowe for Atlanta Art Fair (Atlanta, GA); Darkening Skies at Front Room Gallery, (Hudson NY) Ocean Gleaning at the Baker Museum (Naples, FL); The Flat Earth Society: A Visitation at the Margie E. West Gallery (Athens, GA); Atlantic, East and West at Boecho Gallery (London, UK); Drifters Project at Momentum Gallery (Asheville, NC); Contemporary Spotlight: Pam Longobardi at the Telfair Museum Jepson Center (Savannah, GA); Crossing Over at the David J. Sencer CDC Museum (Atlanta, GA); Reworlding at the Hathaway Gallery (Atlanta, GA); and Oceans: Surface/Below at the Oriel Myrddin Gallery (Carmarthen, Wales, UK).

Longobardi has been included in many group exhibitions, including: Plasticulture: The Rise of Sustainable Practices with Polymers at the School of the Visual Arts Gallery (New York, NY); Invisible Forces, curated by Donovan Johnson at the Johnson Lowe Gallery (Atlanta, GA); Extension of Nature, curated by Birney Robert, sponsored by Arts Entertainment (Atlanta, GA); Anthropocene-Invisible Changes, Czech Cultural Center (New York, NY, travelled to Galerie kritiků in Prague, Czech Republic); Gathered VI, Museum of Contemporary Art Georgia (Atlanta, GA); Three Billion, Hudgens Center for Art (Duluth, GA); Antropologia della Eco-vision at the Palmiere Foundazione, curated by Dores Sacquegna (Lecce, Italy); Fire and Ice at the Cummings Art Center, Connecticut College (New London, CT); Current/Undercurrent at the Hamden Gallery, University of Massachusetts Amherst (Amherst, MA); Reimagining The Global Village at the Milwaukee Institute of Art + Design (Milwaukee, WI); Elements at the Marietta Cobb Museum of Art (Marietta, GA); She is Here at the Atlanta Contemporary Art Center (Atlanta, GA); Vital Force: Water Essential at Front Room Gallery (New York, NY); Anthropocene Island at the Clemente Center, LES Gallery and Pratt Institute (New York, NY); Can’t You Sea? at the Franklin G. Burroughs-Simeon B. Chapin Art Museum (Myrtle Beach, NC); Plastic Entanglements: Ecology, Aesthetics, Materials, Palmer Museum of Art, State College, Pennsylvania (University Park, PA); Imagery Art for Wine Collection at Triton Museum of Art (Santa Clara, CA); State of the Art: Discovering American Art Now at Crystal Bridges Museum of American Art (Bentonville, AR); Bitteres Wasser (Bitter Water) art Galerie Im Hafen Rummelsburg (Berlin, Germany); and Beyond the Pour II: The Creative Process, San Francisco Museum of Craft + Design, San Francisco, CA).

== Museum collections and public holdings ==
Longobardi’s artworks are in the collection of museums and public institutions including, Agnes Scott College (Decatur, GA); the Baker Museum (Naples, FL); Crystal Bridges Museum of American Art (Bentonville, AR); Maier Museum of Art (Lynchburg, VA); Nasher Museum of Art (Durham, NC); Palmer Museum at Penn State University (University Park, PA); and the High Museum of Art (Atlanta, GA).

== Awards, fellowships, and residencies ==
Longobardi’s work has received numerous awards and accolades including the Hudgens Prize (2013); the Bronze Award, Short Films Category at the Spotlight Film Awards (2016); a Focus Fellowship Award (2016); a Special Honorary Mention for Plastic Free Island (short film) at the Cinemare International Ocean Film Festival in Kiel, Germany (2016); the Margie E. West Prize, University of Georgia, Athens (2021); and a Nexus Fund / Warhol Grant Redistribution Award (2022).

In 2014, she earned the title Distinguished University Professor at Georgia State University, and received a Regents Professorship Award from the Board of Regents for the State of Georgia in 2019 and 2022.

Since 2014, Longobardi has been an artist in residence at the Oceanic Society, where she holds the title of Artist-in-Nature. She has also been a Residency Fellow at the Ionian Center for Arts and Culture (Kefalonia, Greece) multiple times since 2011.

== Bibliography ==
A comprehensive documentation of photographs and essays about Longobardi's work via the Drifter's Project titled, Drifters: Plastics, Pollution, Personhood, was published by Edizioni Charta in 2010.

In 2022, Fall Line Press (Milledgeville, Georgia) published Ocean Gleaning, a 252-page book with more than 100 images that tracks nearly two decades of Longobardi’s art and research around the world through the Drifters Project.

Longobardi’s work is also mentioned in Antonia Thomas’ The Routledge Handbook of Archaeology and Plastics (Routledge, 2024).

Longobardi’s projects and exhibitions have been the subject of reviews in print and online publications, some notable mentions include:

- Flamming, EC, “The Perpetual Almost,” Art Papers, November 2024.
- Akers, Torey, “NY’s Upstate Art Weekend returns for its biggest edition yet,” The Art Newspaper, July 21, 2022.
- Hicks, Cinque, “Extension of Nature Brings Moving Art to Downtown Billboards” ArtsATL, July 17, 2023.
- “Pamela Longobardi & les déchets plastiques dans nos océans, de l’inspiration à la dénonciation,” Spark News, April 21, 2023.
- “My Art Uses Plastic Recovered from Beaches Around the World to Understand How Consumer Society is Transforming the Ocean,” The Conversation, February 14, 2023.
- “Making Art From Ocean Plastic to Raise Awareness of Trash,” EarthSky News, February 19, 2023.
- Lamb, Maria, “The Journey of Cast Away Plastic,” Coastal Breeze Magazine, 2022.
- Lewis, Calvin, “Art Exhibit Influences Visitors to Think About Environmental Cleanup,” Fox 4 News, July 7, 2022.
- “Pam Longobardi’s “Swerve” gifted to Baker Museum’s Permanent Collection,” Florida Weekly, April 28, 2022.
- O’Flynn, Kathy, “Pam Longobardi tells profound stories of ocean plastic,” SPOTLIGHT magazine, February 1, 2022.
- Lorenzo, Sharon, “Pam Longobardi Ocean Gleaning,“ A Sharper Eye, February 23, 2022.
- Carpentieri, Toti, “Antropologia dell eurovisione," Vivi La Citta, Il Gazetta Del Mezzogiorno, Lecce, Italy, XI, Gruppo Sinestetico, Worldview.
- Hoffman Fishman, Susan. “Fire and Ice,” Artists & Climate Change, September 27, 2021.
- Schall, Rachel Hausman, “Review: Recognizing Success Amidst the Pandemic,” Art Dose, December 1, 2021.
- Jeffery, Celina, “Curatorial Reflections: Ephemeral Coast,” Journal of Curatorial Studies, Vol. 9 No.2, 2020.
- DiGusta, Linda, "Flowing Force of Nature," ART511 Magazine, Jan 26, 2020.
- Griffin, Nitzanah, “In Dialog with Pam Longobardi,” The Art Section, December, 2020.
- Collins, Lewis, “Swerve” One Earth, Volume 3, Issue 1, July 24, 2020, pp 98–99.
- Keck, Terra. 2019. “Harbingers and Oracles.” ART511 Magazine.
- Bell, Ellen. 2017. “A Culture Defined by What It Discards: Art for the Anthropocene.” PLANET Magazine. UK. May, n. 26.
- Turner-Seydel, Laura. 2017. “Breaking Free from Plastics through Art.” Southern Seasons. Fall issue, p. 36-38.
- Tauches, Karen. 2017. “Messages from the Ocean: An Interview with Pam Longobardi.” Pelican Bomb. January 11 issue.
- Alaimo, Stacy. 2016. Exposed: Environmental Politics and Pleasures in Post-Human Times.University of Minnesota Press. 138–140,188, Figure 8.
- Baker, Shanna. 2015. “New Wave Art,” Hakai Magazine, April 22, 2015.
- Bellows, Layla. n.d. “Plastic Reduction Atlanta Took On the Plastic Straw,” Atlanta Magazine.
- Borek, Barbara. 2016. “Wasser-Kulturen: Die Austellung Bitteres Wasser,” Art in Berlin,July 14, 2016.
- Butler, Jared. 2016. “Hathaway Contemporary Sets the Bar High,”Burnaway, July 27, 2016.
- Breedlove, Byron. 2015. “Welcome to the World of the Plastic Beach.” Emerging Infectious Diseases, 21(4), 736–737, April 2015.
- DiFrisco, Emily. 2016. “From Bali to Komodo: Documenting Plastic Pollution”, Plastic Free Times, November 2, 2016.
- Eaton, Natasha. 2015. International Journal of Maritime History, Book Review, ‘Framing the Ocean’ p. 587-90, August 4, 2015.
- Feaster, Felicia. 2016. “Group Show at new gallery Abounds with Interesting Work,” Atlanta Journal-Constitution, May 16, 2016.
- Grout, Pam. 2015. “A Relational Existence: Art as Powerful Voice to Spark Social Change,” ArtDesk. Issue 5 (Fall/Winter 2015): 18.
- Hansel, Sally. 2015. ‘Terrible Beauty: A Conversation with Pam Longobardi,’ Sculpture Magazine. Vol. 34, No. 3 (April 2015).
- Hawk, Steve. 2014. Sierra Magazine, "The Finer Side of Flotsam." July 30, 2014.
- Jeffery, Celina. 2015. “Artists Curate the Expedition” in The Artist As Curator. Chicago: Intellect Books.
- Jeffery, Celina. 2016. “Pam Longobardi: The Ocean Gleaner,” DRAIN Magazine.
- Kontra, Ally. 2016. “From Trash to Treasure: Plastic Pollution in the Pacific.” February 19, 2016.
- Meier, Allison. 2015. “Artists Confront the Plastic Pollution of Our Ocean,” HYPERALLERGIC, September 1, 2015.
- Regan, Sheila. 2016. “State of the Art is an Unstuffy Contemporary Art Show for All, City Pages, Minneapolis, February 19, 2016.
- Relyea, Laura. 2016. “David Hathaway to Open on the Westside,” ArtsATL, Jan 4 year
- Sentman, Wayne. 2014. “Dragons to Debris: An Oceanic Society Expedition to Komodo,”
- Shaw, Kurt. 2015. “Art Review: Second Nature at James Gallery,” Pittsburgh Tribune. October 7, 2015.
- Turner Seydel, Laura. 2017. "Breaking Free from Plastics Through Art." HuffPost. October 12, 2017.
- Valentine, Ben. 2015. ‘One Artist’s Quest to Turn Beach Plastic Into Art’, HYPERALLERGIC.August 26, 2015. One Artist's Quest to Turn Beach Plastic into Art
- Vega, Muriel. 2016. “Hathaway David Contemporary Opens with Inaugural Exhibition." Creative Loafing. April 26, 2016.
- Wagner-Lawlor, Jennifer. 2016. “Regarding Intimacy, Regard, and Transformative Feminist Practice in the Art of Pamela Longobardi.” Feminist Studies 42.3: 649–688
- Webb, Victoria. 2016. “Hathaway David Contemporary in Atlanta.” Furious Dreams,June 10, 2016. Hathaway David Contemporary in Atlanta | Furious Dreams – art blog by Victoria Webb
