= Joe Fig =

American artist and author

- Born: January 21, 1968 (age 58); Seaford, New York, U.S.
- Education: School of Visual Arts (BFA, MFA)
- Occupations: Artist; author
- Website: www.joefig.com

Joe Fig (born January 21, 1968, in Seaford, NY) is an American artist and author best known for his paintings, sculptures, drawings and photographs that explore the creative process, the working lives of artists, and the spaces where art is made. His work draws from Western art history, the mythology of art, and visual culture.

== Career ==
Joe Fig was born in 1968 in Seaford, New York, and received both his BFA and MFA from the School of Visual Arts in New York. His early work includes reproductions of the studios of legendary modern artists, such as Jackson Pollock, Jasper Johns, and Willem de Kooning. He also previously produced a group of paintings that focus on the art historical moment when the young pioneers of modernism—like Édouard Manet—overtook the old guard of painting.

In 2005, Fig turned his attention to the work spaces and lives of contemporary artists. In his most recent work, he begins by conducting an interview with an artist in his or her studio. Fig asks them a series of questions about their daily routines and the history of their practice, before photographing and recording their studio and its contents. He then creates a meticulous replicate of that artist's studio, in sculpture, painting, and/or drawing.

The artworks both champion the creative process and reveal the mundane tasks involved in making art. Each portrait documents how an artist has organized his or her space, as well as the tools and inspirations he or she keeps at hand. The works contain such details as spectacles resting on a desk, books stacked on shelves, or paint drips on a floor. By presenting this "god's-eye view" of artists in their studios, Fig not only demystifies the creative act, but also illuminates the contrast between spaces where art is made and spaces where art is shown.

Fig is represented by Cristin Tierney Gallery in New York.

== Writing ==
Fig is the author of the books Inside the Painter's Studio and Inside the Artist's Studio, published by Princeton Architectural Press in 2009 and 2015, respectively. In complement to his artistic practice, both books document Fig's conversations with the artists he has interviewed, and include photographs of their studios. His sculptures and paintings of the interviewees' studios are also illustrated. Fig's second book, Inside the Artist's Studio, provides insights into the lives and studios of several select contemporary artists, including Leonardo Drew, Kate Gilmore, Roxy Paine, Will Ryman, and Laurie Simmons.

Fig also contributed to the book Narcissus in the Studio, which was published by the Pennsylvania Academy of the Fine Arts in 2010.

== Publications ==
- Fig, Joe. Inside the Artist’s Studio. New York, NY: Princeton Architectural Press, 2015.
- Manco, Tristan. Big Art / Small Art. London: Thames & Hudson, 2014.
- Cozzolino, Robert. Narcissus in the Studio: Artist Portraits and Self-Portraits. Philadelphia, PA: Pennsylvania Academy of the Fine Arts, 2010.
- Fig, Joe. Inside the Painter’s Studio. New York, NY: Princeton Architectural Press, 2009.

== Public Collections ==
- Altoids Curiously Strong Collection
- The Bruce Museum of Arts and Science, Greenwich, CT
- Chazen Museum of Art, Madison, WI
- Fogg Art Museum, Harvard University, Cambridge, MA
- Hood Museum of Art, Dartmouth College, Hanover, NH
- Library of Congress, Washington, DC
- New Britain Museum of American Art, CT
- New York Public Library, NY
- Norton Museum of Art, West Palm Beach, FL
- Parrish Art Museum, Southampton, NY
- Toledo Museum of Art, OH
