= Tamara Santibañez =

American artist (born 1987)

Tamara Santibañez (born May 18, 1987) is an American multidisciplinary visual artist, known for paintings, sculptures, and tattoos. Their work explores topics like Chicanx culture, punk aesthetics, gender, and the intersection of marginalized identities. Santibañez's art often incorporates everyday objects, using them to challenge assumptions about class, race, and sexuality. They are also the author of Could This Be Magic? Tattooing as Liberation Work, which discusses tattooing as a form of self-expression and empowerment. Santibañez lives in New York City.

== Life and career ==
Tamara Santibañez was born on May 18, 1987, in Athens, Georgia. They were raised in Athens, Georgia. Their mother was a Spanish language interpreter and their father was a professor at the University of Georgia. Before their divorce, the family lived in a suburban college town with a small amount of Latino population. From an early age, Santibañez embraced punk culture and its aesthetics. Their mixed heritage of Mexican and white, and rebellious spirit led to a lot of cultural isolation.

Attending art school in New York City, Santibañez was able to experience diversity and learn about body art and tattooing. By 17, they started experimenting with body art, getting their first tattoo at a punk show. This began a lifelong relationship with tattooing that shaped their artistic vision. Later on, they began working at the legendary Saved Tattoo in Brooklyn. There, they were able to grow their skills and tattooing style. This motivated them to look into tattooing outside of the shop, leading them to volunteer to teach the art and the history of tattoos to young offenders at Rikers Island.

In addition to artistic pursuits, they earned a degree in oral history from Columbia University. This academic background informs their nuanced approach to storytelling and cultural critique within their work. The human body is not their only medium; they also experimented with painting and sculpture projects. They combine their Chicanx heritage and goth aesthetic to display their interpretations of West Coast imagery.

=== Tattooing and social justice ===
A significant aspect of Santibañez's work is commitment to a trauma informed and justice-centered approach to tattooing. They have spearheaded initiatives such as the creation of a "Client Bill of Rights" and have collaborated with organizations like the Women's Prison Association to develop trauma-aware tattooing guidelines. Through these projects, they advocate for tattooing as a form of empowerment and emotional labor, positioning it as both an art form and a tool for social change.

== Notable works ==
=== Landscapes ===
Santibañez's first solo exhibition featured a collection of paintings showing different depictions of leather. Their representations of handcuffs, whips, chains, and leather symbolized more than sexual innuendos. Their goal is to defeat ignorance that stems from the eyes and judgment. The exhibition took place in Los Angeles California, open from September to October in 2016.

=== Could This Be Magic? (2021) ===
In 2019, Santibañez began working on their book that draws connections to political issues and recurring themes in tattooing. Published on March 18, 2021, it focuses on how tattoos can function as a transformative tool for personal identity and a medium for social commentary. They believe that tattoos can be coping mechanisms or manifestos of resistance. Santibañez conducted research through interviews and surveys of tattoo artists, social workers, and activists. Could This Be Magic? is their way of calling for a more ethical approach to tattooing.
