= Lillie and Hugh Roy Cullen Sculpture Garden =

Sculpture garden in Houston, Texas, US

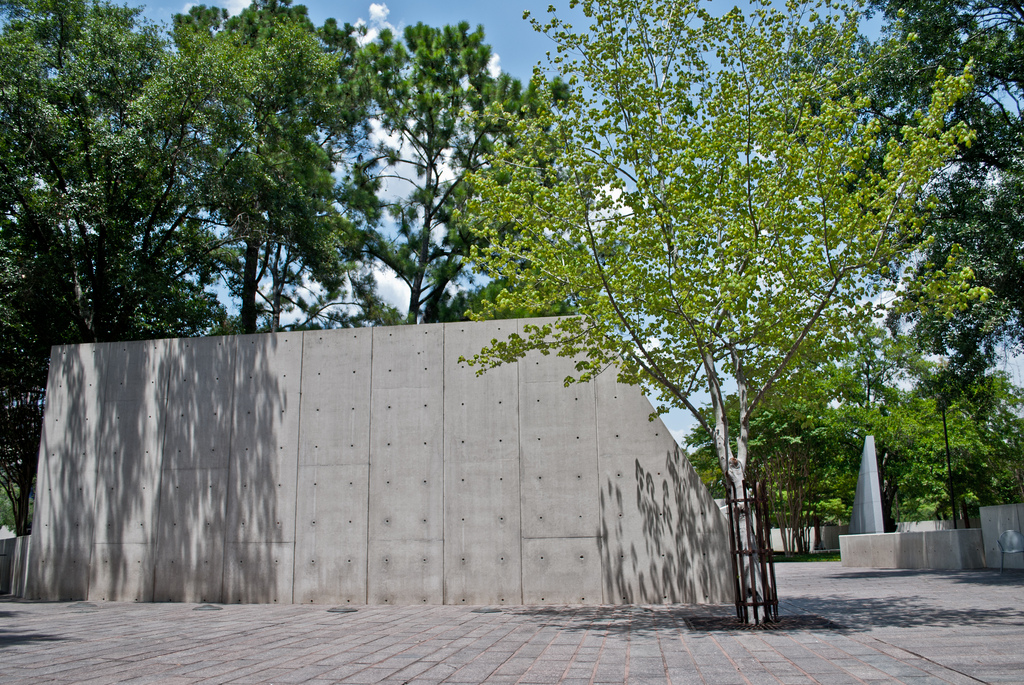
- Dividing wall in the Cullen Sculpture Garden

- Location within Texas Location within the United States
- Location: Houston, Texas, US
- Coordinates: 29°43′35.79″N 95°23′26.27″W
- Area: 2 acres (1 ha)
- Established: 1986
- Website: prv.mfah.org

The Lillie and Hugh Roy Cullen Sculpture Garden is a sculpture garden located at the Museum of Fine Arts, Houston (MFAH) in Houston, Texas, United States. Designed by artist and landscape architect Isamu Noguchi, the garden consists of 25 works of the MFAH, including sculptures by Henri Matisse, Alexander Calder, David Smith, Frank Stella, and Louise Bourgeois. There are also sculptures created specifically for the site, including Ellsworth Kelly's Houston Triptych and Tony Cragg's New Forms. The garden also features works by local Texas artists, including Joseph Havel's Exhaling Pearls, Jim Love's Can Johnny Come Out and Play?, and Linda Ridgway's The Dance.

== History ==
In 1969, The Brown Foundation, Inc provided the funds to purchase two city blocks making it feasible for the MFAH to construct a formal sculpture garden. The garden was designed by New York-based artist and landscape architect Isamu Noguchi. In 1978, Houston City Council motion number 78-986 declared the museum to be named The Lillie and Hugh Roy Cullen Sculpture Garden in recognition of Hugh Roy Cullen and Lillie Cullen's contributions to the city's art and medical communities. Construction of the garden began on February 6, 1984, and the garden officially opened to the public on April 5, 1986.

== Works ==
- Antoine Bourdelle, Adam (1889)
- Louise Bourgeois, Quarantania I
- Alexander Calder, The Crab (1962)
- Anthony Caro, Argentine (1968)
- Pietro Consagra, Conversation with the Wind (1962)
- Tony Cragg, New Forms
- Raymond Duchamp-Villon, The Large Horse (1914)
- Lucio Fontana, Concetto Spaziale, Natura, no. 18 and Concetto Spaziale, Natura, no. 28
- Alberto Giacometti, Large Standing Woman I
- DeWitt Godfrey, Untitled (1989)
- Joseph Havel, Exhaling Pearls (1993)
- Bryan Hunt, Arch Falls (1981)
- Bryan Hunt, Big Twist (1978)
- Anish Kapoor, Cloud Column (1998–2006) (between the sculpture garden and Glassell School of Art)
- Ellsworth Kelly, Houston Triptych (1986)
- Jim Love, Can Johnny Come Out and Play?
- Aristide Maillol, Flora, Nude
- Marino Marini, The Pilgrim
- Henri Matisse, The Back Series (Back I, Back II, Back III, Back IV)
- Joan Miró, Bird
- Mimmo Paladino, The Sound of Night
- Linda Ridgway, The Dance (2000)
- Auguste Rodin, Cybele
- Auguste Rodin, The Spirit of Eternal Repose (1898–1899)
- Auguste Rodin, The Walking Man
- Joel Shapiro, Untitled (1990)
- David Smith, Two Circle Sentinel (1961)
- Frank Stella, Decanter (1987)
- William Tucker, Gymnast II (1985)
- Eduardo Ramírez Villamizar, Recuerdo de Machu Picchu 3 (Las terrazas) (1984)
