= List of public art in Houston =

This is a list of public artworks in Houston, Texas, United States.

== Outdoor sculptures ==
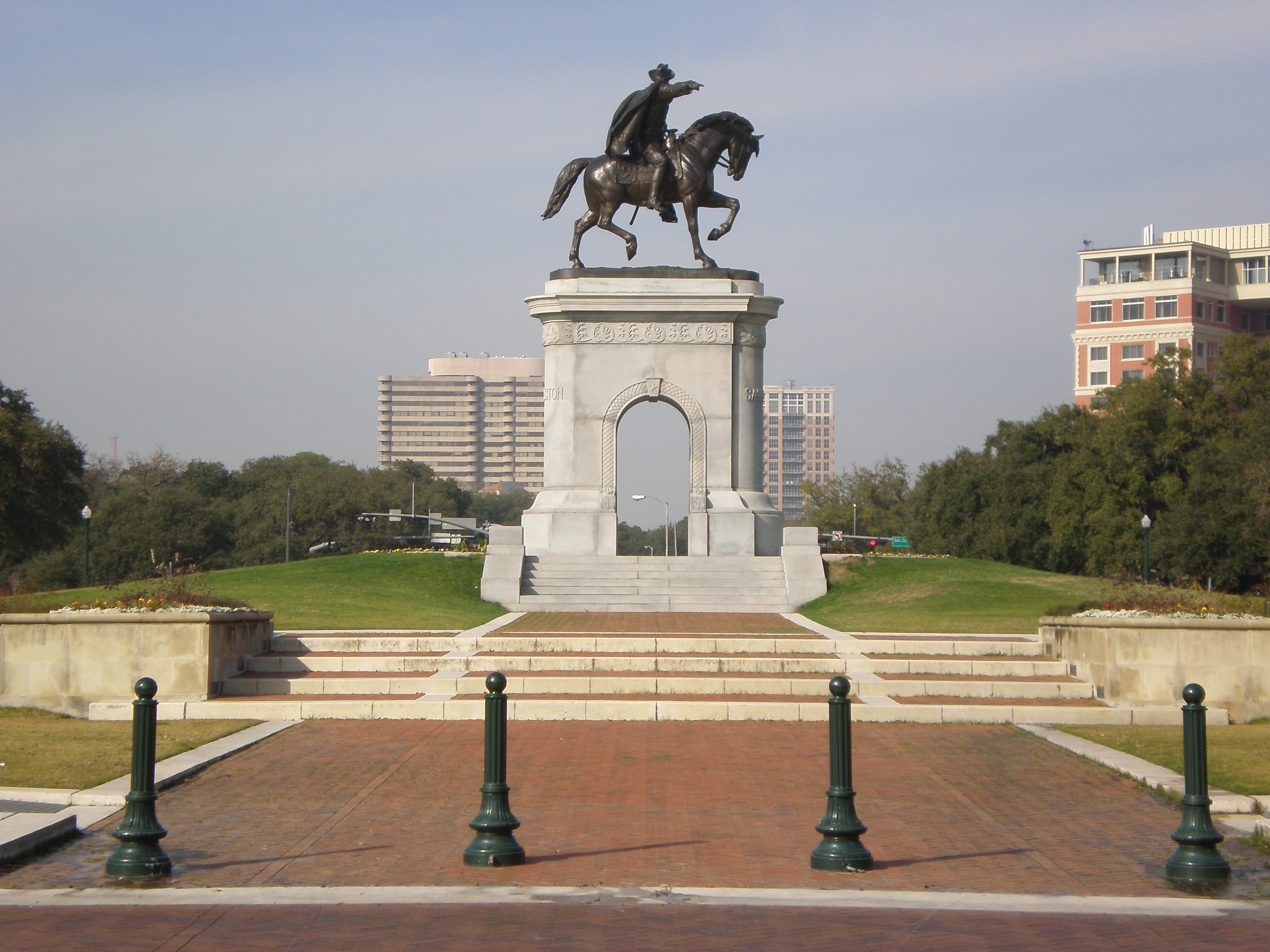
Sam Houston Monument

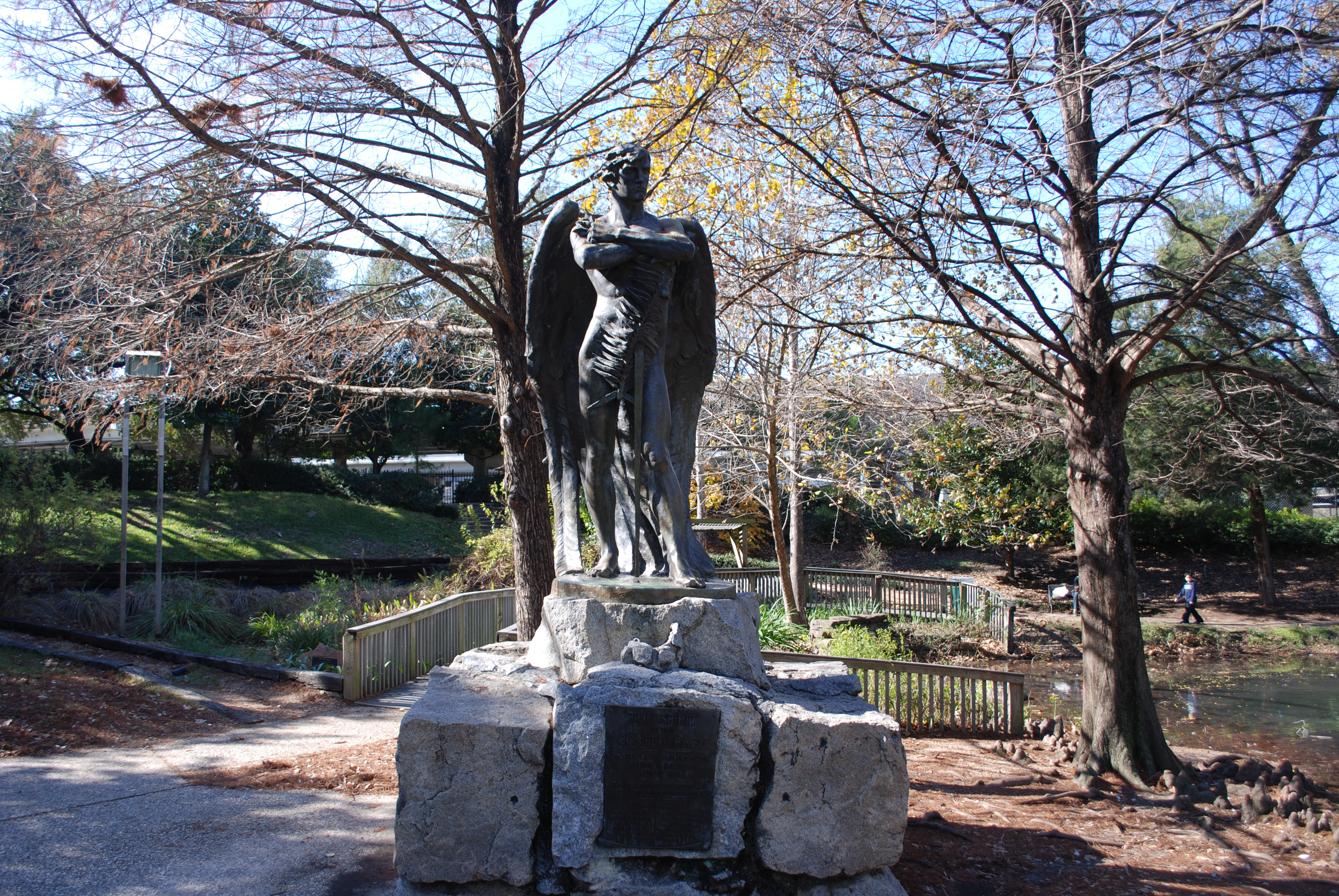
Spirit of the Confederacy

- African Elephant (1982)
- Atropos Key (1972), Miller Outdoor Theatre
- Beer Can House
- Broken Obelisk, Rothko Chapel
- Brownie (1905), Houston Zoo
- Bygones (1976), Menil Collection
- Cancer, There Is Hope (1990)
- Charlotte Allen Fountain
- Charmstone (sculpture), Menil Collection
- Cloud Column (2006), Glassell School of Art
- George H. W. Bush Monument
- Inversion
- Isolated Mass/Circumflex (Number 2)
- Lillian Schnitzer Fountain (1875), Hermann Park
- Monument au Fantôme, Discovery Green
- Oliver Twist
- The Orange Show
- Pioneer Memorial (1936), Hermann Park
- Points of View (1991), Market Square Park
- Radiant Fountains
- Scanlan Fountain
- Sam Houston Monument, Hermann Park
- Spirit of the Confederacy, Sam Houston Park
- Statue of Christopher Columbus (1992), Bell Park
- Statue of George H. Hermann
- Statue of Richard W. Dowling (1905), Hermann Park
- Tolerance
- Virtuoso, Downtown Houston
- World War I Monument
- World War II Memorial

=== Lillie and Hugh Roy Cullen Sculpture Garden ===
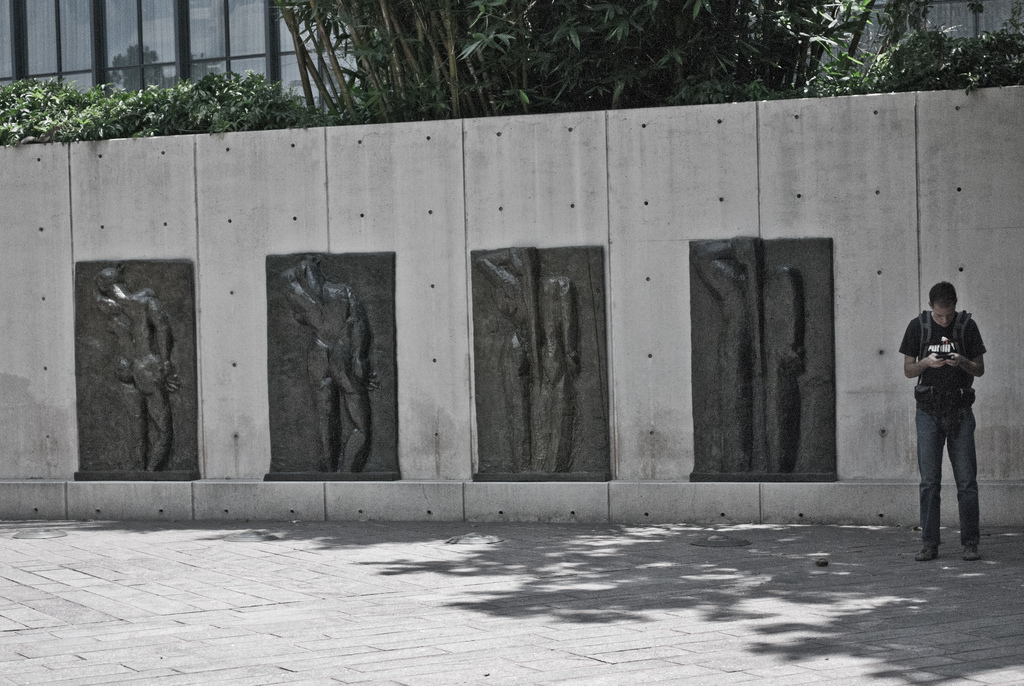
The Back Series, Lillie and Hugh Roy Cullen Sculpture Garden

The following works have been displayed at the Lillie and Hugh Roy Cullen Sculpture Garden:

- Adam
- Arch Falls
- The Back Series
- Big Twist
- Conversation with the Wind
- The Crab
- Cybele
- The Dance
- Decanter
- Exhaling Pearls
- Flora, Nude
- Gymnast II
- Houston Triptych
- The Large Horse
- Large Standing Woman I
- New Forms
- The Pilgrim
- Quarantania I
- Recuerdo de Machu Picchu 3 (Las terrazas)
- The Sound of Night
- The Spirit of Eternal Repose
- Two Circle Sentinel
- The Walking Man
- Untitled (Shapiro, 1990)

=== McGovern Centennial Gardens ===
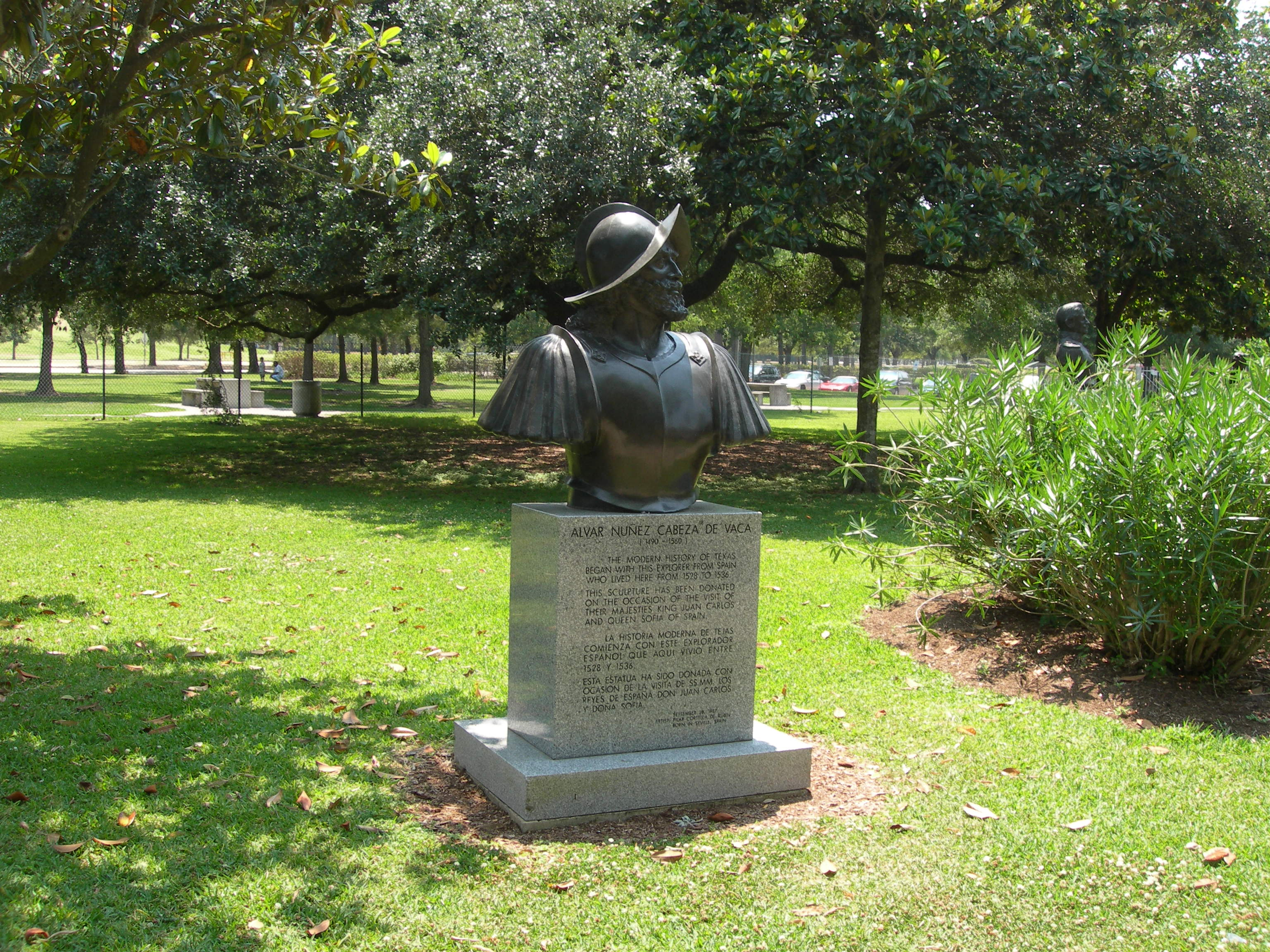
Bust of Álvar Núñez Cabeza de Vaca, McGovern Centennial Gardens

The following works are installed at McGovern Centennial Gardens:

- Bust of Álvar Núñez Cabeza de Vaca
- Bust of Benito Juárez
- Bust of Bernardo O'Higgins
- Bust of José de San Martín
- Bust of José Martí
- Bust of José Rizal
- Bust of Ramón Castilla
- Bust of Robert Burns
- Bust of Simón Bolívar
- Bust of Vicente Rocafuerte
- Dawn (1931)
- Statue of Confucius (2009)
- Statue of Mahatma Gandhi (2004)
- Statue of Martin Luther King Jr.

== See also ==
- George Bush Intercontinental Airport#Artwork
