= Atropos Key =

Sculpture in Houston, Texas, U.S.

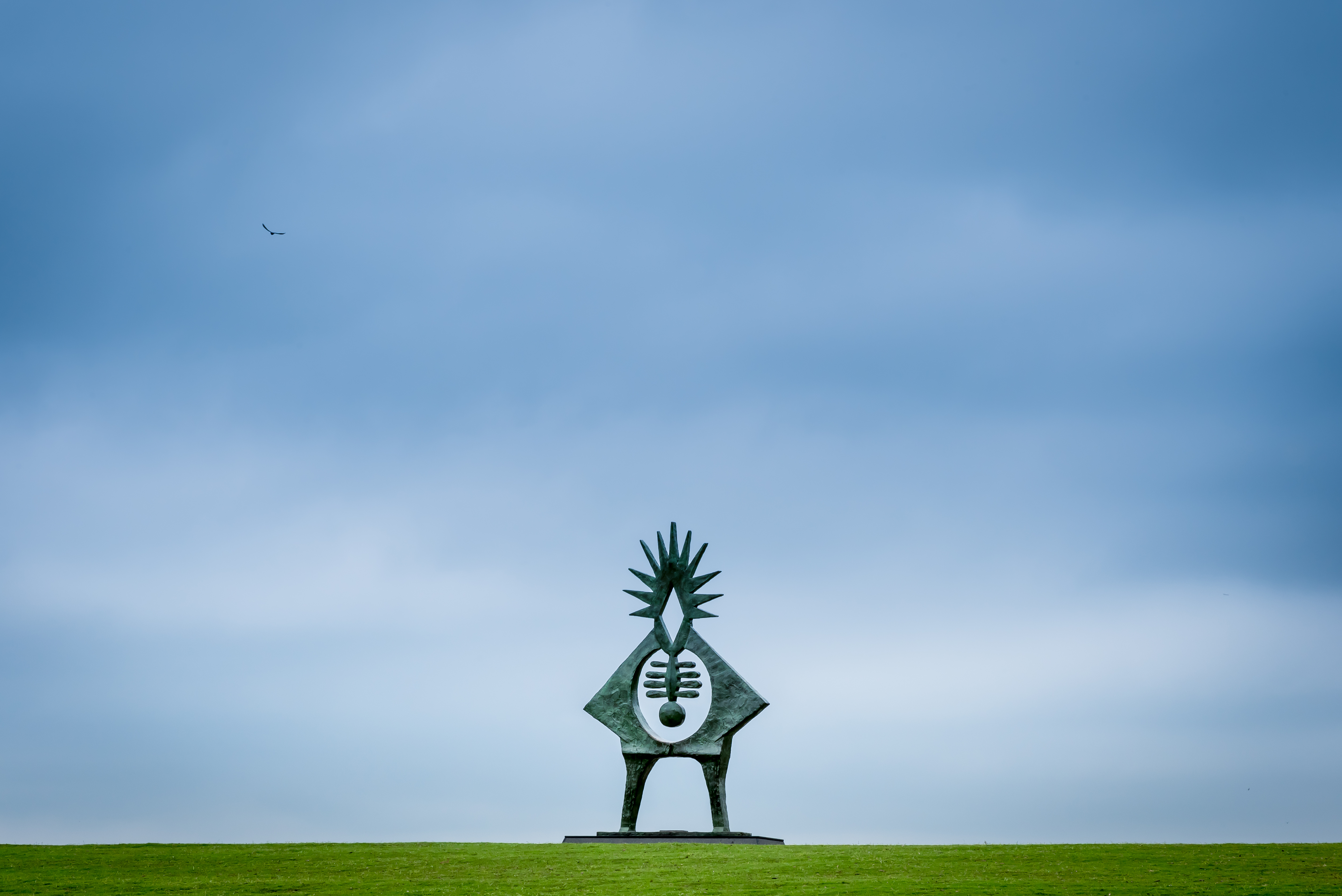
- The sculpture in 2015
- Artist: Hannah Holliday Stewart
- Year: 1972
- Medium: Bronze sculpture
- Dimensions: 3.4 m (11 ft)
- Weight: 1200 lbs.
- Location: Miller Outdoor Theatre, in Hermann Park, Houston, Texas, United States
- 29°43′11.8″N 95°23′21″W

Atropos Key is an outdoor 1972 bronze sculpture by Hannah Holliday Stewart, installed at Houston's Miller Outdoor Theatre, in the U.S. state of Texas.

== See also ==
- 1972 in art
- List of public art in Houston
