= Recuerdo de Machu Picchu 3 (Las terrazas) =

Sculpture in Houston, Texas, U.S.

- Memory of Machu Picchu 3 (The Terraces) (English)
- Artist: Eduardo Ramírez Villamizar
- Year: 1984
- Type: Sculpture
- Medium: Iron
- Location: Museum of Fine Arts, Houston; Houston, Texas, United States; 29°43′35.3″N 95°23′26.2″W
- Owner: Museum of Fine Arts, Houston

Recuerdo de Machu Picchu 3 (Las terrazas) (English: Memory of Machu Picchu 3 (The Terraces)), is an outdoor 1984 oxidized iron sculpture by Colombian artist Eduardo Ramírez Villamizar, installed at the Museum of Fine Arts, Houston's Lillie and Hugh Roy Cullen Sculpture Garden, in the U.S. state of Texas. The sculpture was purchased by the museum with funds provided by the Caribbean Art Fund and the Caroline Wiess Law Accessions Endowment Fund. It measures 55 1/8 x 114 3/16 x 41 5/16 inches.

== See also ==
- 1984 in art
- List of public art in Houston
