= Bygones =

Bygones may refer to:

- Bygones (TV series), a British documentary programme 1967–1989
- Bygones (film), a 1987 Dutch film
- Bygones (sculpture), a 1976 work by Mark di Suvero in Houston, Texas, US
- The Bygones, an American indie folk duo of Joshua Lee Turner and Allison Young
- Bygones, an American band featuring Zach Hill and Nick Reinhart of Tera Melos
- "Bygones (Won't Go)", a 2001 song by Nick Lowe from The Convincer

== See also ==
- Bygones principle, an economic theory
