= The Spirit of Eternal Repose =

Sculpture by Auguste Rodin

- Le génie du repos éternel (French)
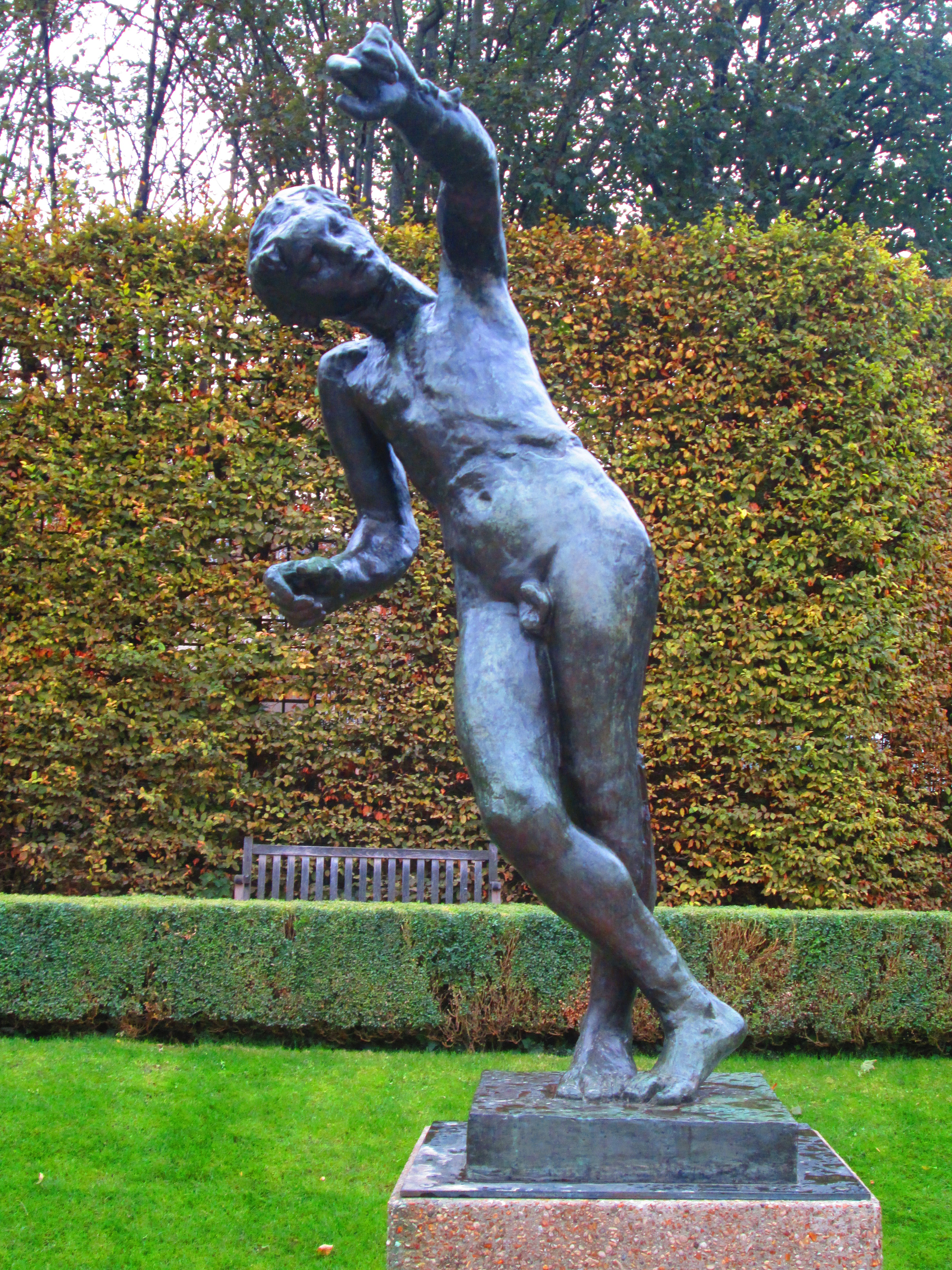
- The sculpture in the garden of the Musée Rodin
- Artist: Auguste Rodin
- Year: 1899 to 1902
- Type: Sculpture
- Medium: Bronze

The Spirit of Eternal Repose (French: Le génie du repos éternel) is an 1898–1899 sculpture of a sprite by French artist Auguste Rodin.

== Houston ==
The Museum of Fine Arts, Houston's Lillie and Hugh Roy Cullen Sculpture Garden has a bronze sculpture. The Houston Press called the work "curious, since the ankles are crossed as they might be when a person is relaxing, but the tilted angle of the torso is precarious and the muscular arms are very active indeed. It is enigmatic and wonderful." It is one of three Rodin sculptures in the garden; the other two are Cybele (1890/1904) and The Walking Man (1877–1878). Spirit of Eternal Repose is on long-term loan from Iris Cantor and the Cantor Foundation on behalf of B. Gerald Cantor.

== See also ==
- 1899 in art
- List of public art in Houston
- List of sculptures by Auguste Rodin
