= Flora, Nude =

Sculpture by Aristide Maillol

- La Flore, nue (French)
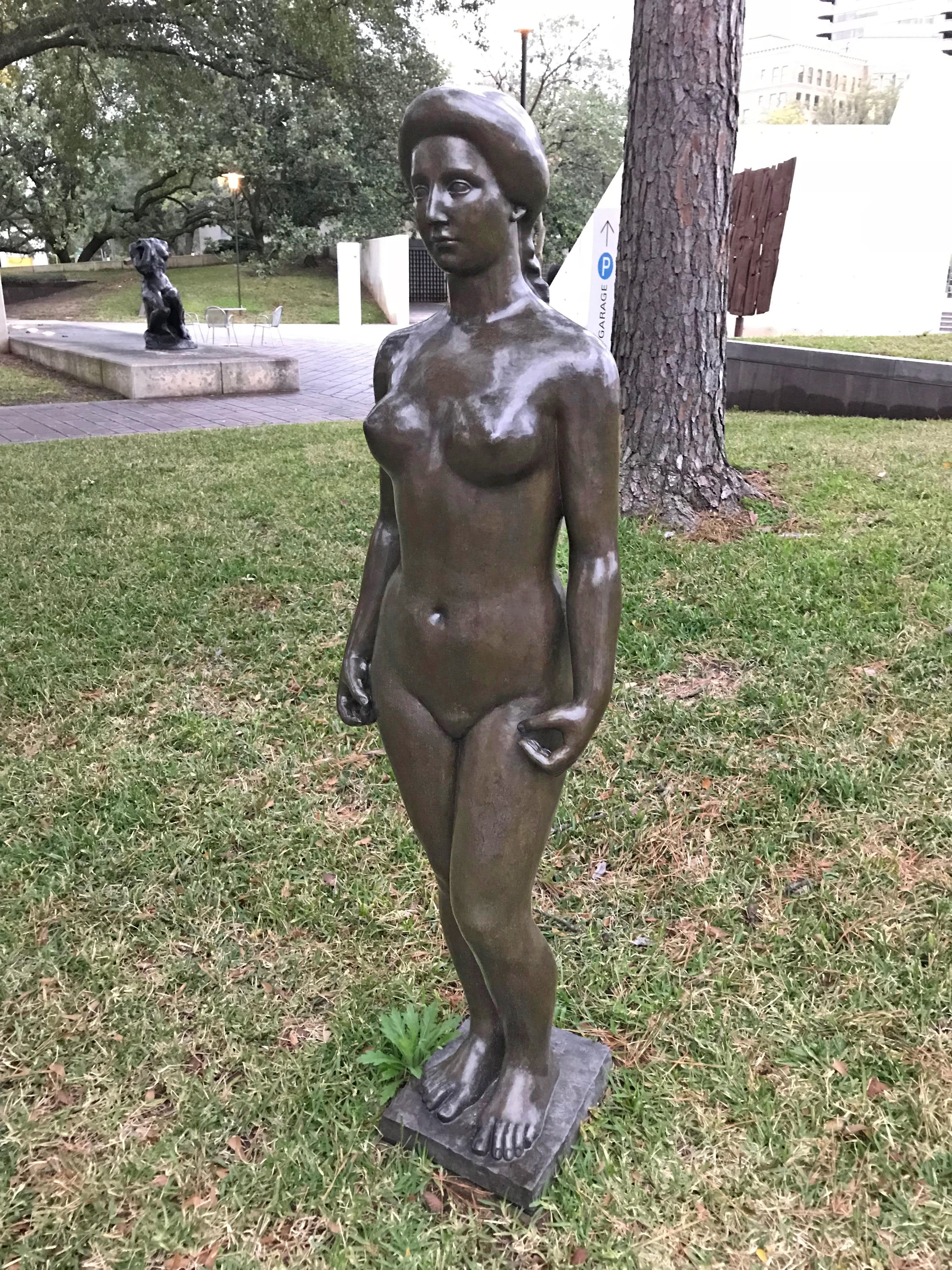
- The statue in Houston's Lillie and Hugh Roy Cullen Sculpture Garden in 2019
- Artist: Aristide Maillol
- Year: 1910 (cast 1960–1965)
- Type: Sculpture
- Medium: Bronze (Detroit, Houston)
- Location: United States: Museum of Fine Arts, Houston, Texas; Detroit Institute of Arts, Detroit, Michigan; 29.7266°N 95.3905°W

Flora, Nude (French: La Flore, nue) is a sculpture by the French artist Aristide Maillol.

== Copies ==
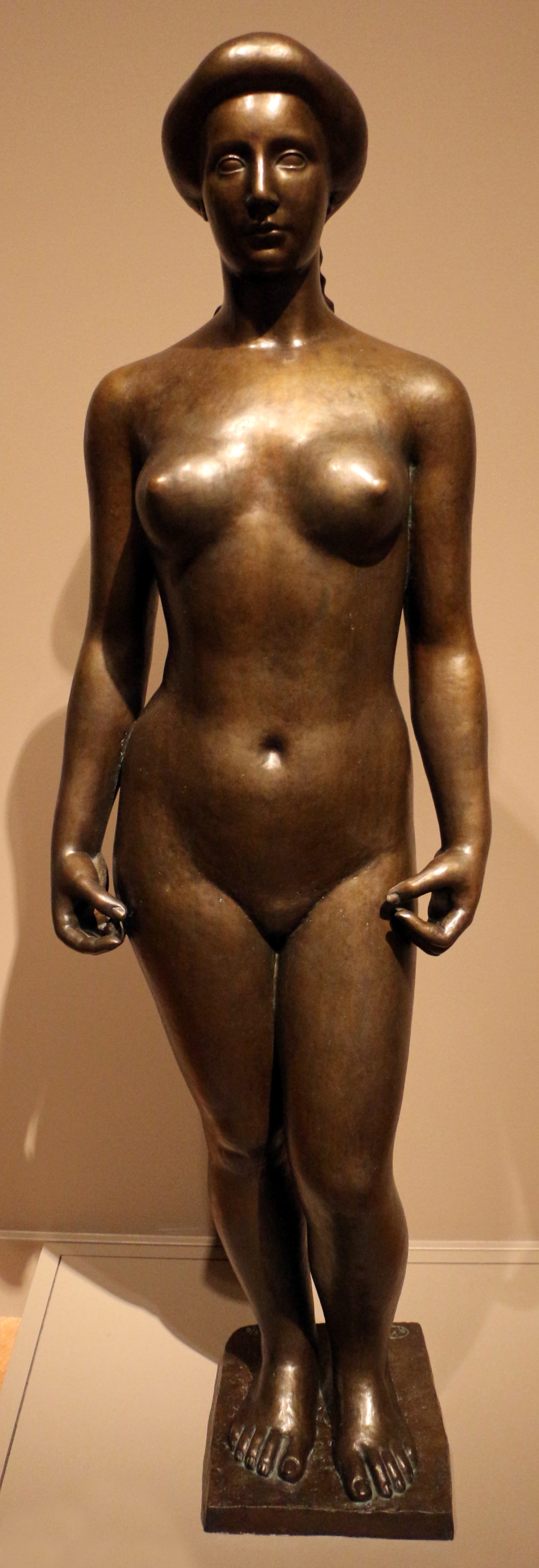
Detroit Institute of Arts, bronze

=== Houston ===
A 1910 bronze sculpture is installed at the Museum of Fine Arts, Houston's Lillie and Hugh Roy Cullen Sculpture Garden, in the U.S. state of Texas. It was cast during 1960–1965 and gifted to the museum by Isaac Arnold, Jr. in honor of his wife, Antonette Tilly Arnold.

== See also ==
- 1910 in art
- List of public art in Houston
