= Gymnast II =

Sculpture in Houston, Texas, U.S.

- Artist: William Tucker
- Year: 1985
- Medium: Bronze sculpture
- Location: Houston; 29°43′34.9″N 95°23′25.6″W

Gymnast II is an outdoor 1985 bronze sculpture by William Tucker, installed in Houston's Lillie and Hugh Roy Cullen Sculpture Garden, in the U.S. state of Texas.

== See also ==
- List of public art in Houston
