= The Sound of Night =

Sculpture by Mimmo Paladino in Houston, Texas, U.S.

- Il Rumore della Notte (Italian)
- Artist: Mimmo Paladino
- Year: 1986
- Type: Sculpture
- Medium: Bronze
- Location: Museum of Fine Arts, Houston; Houston
- Owner: Museum of Fine Arts, Houston

The Sound of Night (Italian: Il Rumore della Notte) is an outdoor 1986 bronze sculpture by Italian artist Mimmo Paladino, installed at the Museum of Fine Arts, Houston's (MFAH) Lillie and Hugh Roy Cullen Sculpture Garden, in the U.S. state of Texas. According to MFAH, the work illustrates the artist's "[revisit to] the disquieting sensibility of Breton and his contemporaries, tapping into both cultural archetypes and the language of dreams " It was donated to the museum by Alice and Timothy Sharma.

== See also ==
- 1986 in art
- List of public art in Houston
