= The Pilgrim (Marini) =

Sculpture by Marino Marini

- Artist: Marino Marini
- Year: 1939
- Type: Bronze
- Location: Houston, United States; 29°43′36.1″N 95°23′26.9″W
- Owner: Museum of Fine Arts, Houston

The Pilgrim (Il pellegrino) is a bronze sculpture by Marino Marini.

Cast in 1939, it is in The Lillie and Hugh Roy Cullen Sculpture Garden, Museum of Fine Arts, Houston.

This work is an early example of the artist's development of his horse and rider theme.

== See also ==
- List of public art in Houston
