= Bust of Álvar Núñez Cabeza de Vaca =

Sculpture by Pilar Cortella de Rubin

Álvar Núñez Cabeza de Vaca
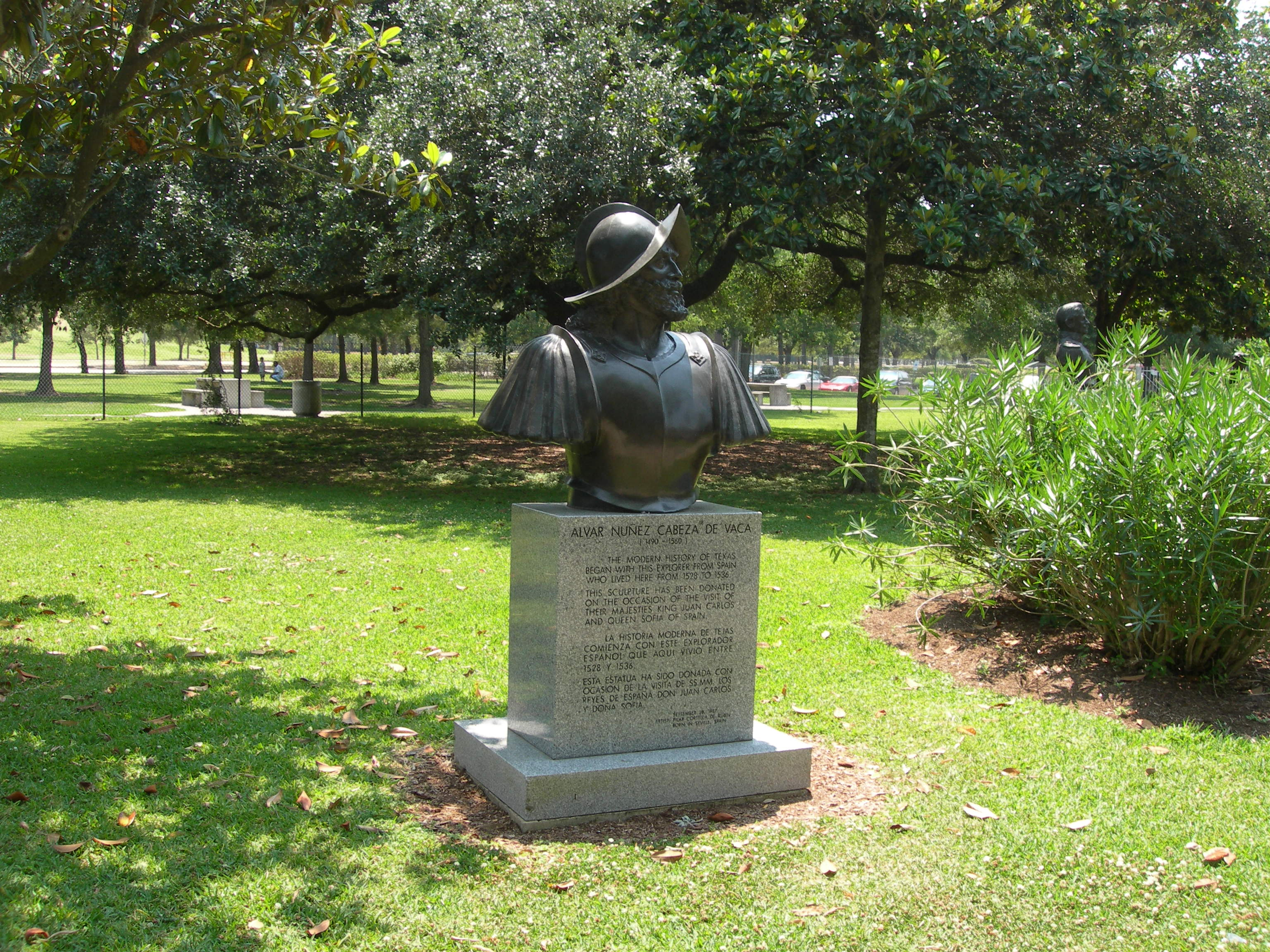
- The bust in 2008
- Artist: Pilar Cortella de Rubin
- Type: Sculpture
- Medium: Bronze
- Subject: Álvar Núñez Cabeza de Vaca
- Location: Houston, Texas, United States; 29°43′19.8″N 95°23′17.4″W

Álvar Núñez Cabeza de Vaca is an outdoor sculpture of the Spanish explorer of the same name by Pilar Cortella de Rubin, installed at Hermann Park's McGovern Centennial Gardens in Houston, Texas, in the United States. The bronze bust rests on a granite pedestal and was acquired by the City of Houston in 1986.

== See also ==
- List of public art in Houston
