= Statue of George H. Hermann =

1981 bronze sculpture in Houston, Texas, U.S.

- Artist: Lonnie Edwards
- Year: 1981
- Medium: Bronze sculpture
- Subject: George H. Hermann
- Location: Houston, Texas, United States; 29.715217°N 95.395739°W

An outdoor 1981 bronze sculpture depicting George H. Hermann by Lonnie Edwards is installed in Houston's Hermann Park, in the U.S. state of Texas. The statue, which stands on a pink granite pedestal, was donated by the Hermann Hospital Board of Trustees.

== See also ==
- List of public art in Houston
