= Exhaling Pearls =

Sculpture in Houston, Texas, U.S.

- Artist: Joseph Havel
- Year: 1993
- Type: Sculpture
- Medium: Bronze
- Location: 29°43′36.1″N 95°23′25.9″W

Exhaling Pearls is an outdoor 1993 bronze sculpture by postmodernist American artist Joseph Havel, installed at the Museum of Fine Arts, Houston's Lillie and Hugh Roy Cullen Sculpture Garden, in the U.S. state of Texas.

The sculpture is cast from a rope and two paper lanterns. The museum, who purchased the work with donations from the Nona and Richard Barrett, the Caroline Wiess Law Accessions Endowment Fund, Max and Isabell Smith Herzstein, Isabel B. Wilson, and friends of Havel, has called the work an "improbable hybrid", "[rising] up in a playfully gallant affirmation of life and creation".

== See also ==
- 1993 in art
- List of public art in Houston
