= Houston Triptych =

1986 sculpture by Ellsworth Kelly

- Artist: Ellsworth Kelly
- Year: 1986
- Type: Sculpture
- Medium: Bronze
- Location: Museum of Fine Arts, Houston; Houston, Texas, United States; 29°43′35.6″N 95°23′27.1″W
- Owner: Museum of Fine Arts, Houston

Houston Triptych is an outdoor 1986 bronze sculpture by American artist Ellsworth Kelly, installed at the Museum of Fine Arts, Houston's Lillie and Hugh Roy Cullen Sculpture Garden, in Texas. It was commissioned by the museum and donated by the Brown Foundation, Inc. and Mr. and Mrs. M. S. Stude in honor of Mr. and Mrs. George R. Brown. Artnet's Phyllis Tuchman described the work as "three black geometric shapes mounted on a tall concrete wall" and said, "After the rain, the metal is dark and foreboding. In sunlight, shadows cast on the wall where the elements reach 12 inches into space practically mimic ivy vines."

== See also ==
- 1986 in art
- List of public art in Houston
