= The Back Series =

Bas-relief sculptures by Henri Matisse

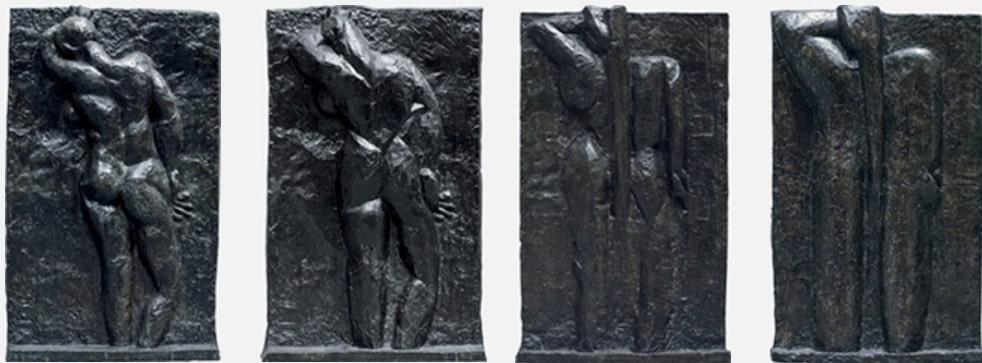
- Artist: Henri Matisse
- Year: 1909–1930
- Type: Plaster / Bronze

The Back Series is a series of four bas-relief sculptures, by Henri Matisse. They are Matisse's largest and most monumental sculptures. The plaster originals are housed in the Musée Matisse in Le Cateau-Cambrésis, France.

They were modeled between 1909 and 1930. Back (I) appeared in the second PostImpressionist show in London and the Armory Show in New York City.

All four sculptures were unique plaster casts until 1950, when Back (I), (III), and (IV) were cast in bronze. Back (II) was rediscovered in 1955, a year after the artist’s death, and then cast. The series have been cast in a bronze edition of twelve, including one for the artist's family. Nine complete sets are housed in nine major museums around the world:

- Musée National d'Art Moderne (Paris)
- Tate (London)
- Kunsthaus Zürich (Zürich)
- Staatsgalerie Stuttgart (Stuttgart)
- Museum of Modern Art (New York)
- Hirshhorn Museum and Sculpture Garden (Washington D. C.)
- Franklin D. Murphy Sculpture Garden (Los Angeles)
- Kimbell Art Museum (Fort Worth)
- Lillie and Hugh Roy Cullen Sculpture Garden, Museum of Fine Arts (Houston)

== See also ==
- List of works by Henri Matisse
- List of public art in Houston
