= Decanter (sculpture) =

Sculpture in Houston, Texas, U.S.

- Artist: Frank Stella
- Year: 1987
- Type: Sculpture
- Medium: Stainless steel, bronze, carbon steel
- Location: Museum of Fine Arts, Houston; Houston, Texas, United States; 29°43′37.2″N 95°23′25.8″W

Decanter is an outdoor 1987 sculpture by Frank Stella, installed at the Museum of Fine Arts, Houston's Lillie and Hugh Roy Cullen Sculpture Garden in the U.S. state of Texas. It is made of stainless steel, bronze, and carbon steel, and was purchased using monetary contributions from the Alice Pratt Brown Museum Fund. According to the museum, the piece "offers a exuberant collage of forms which bursts out into space".

== See also ==
- 1987 in art
- List of public art in Houston
