= Monument au Fantôme =

Sculpture by Jean Dubuffet in Houston, Texas, U.S.

- Monument to the Phantom (English)
- Artist: Jean Dubuffet
- Year: 1977
- Type: Sculpture
- Medium: Painted fiberglass, steel
- Location: Houston, Texas, United States; 29°45′12″N 95°21′30″W

Monument au Fantôme (English: Monument to the Phantom) is an outdoor sculpture by French sculptor Jean Dubuffet, in 1977. It was originally inaugurated at the plaza of 1100 Louisiana. It is installed on Avenida de las Americas at Discovery Green in Houston, Texas, United States, since 2008. The painted fiberglass and steel frame sculpture features seven individual forms that represent features of Houston, including a chimney, church, dog, hedge, mast, phantom, and tree. Donated by the Dan Duncan family, it is part of Dubuffet's Hourloupe series, which has companion sculptures in Chicago, New York, and in Europe.

== See also ==
- List of public art in Houston
