= Arch Falls =

Sculpture in Houston, Texas, U.S.

- Artist: Bryan Hunt
- Year: 1981
- Type: Sculpture
- Medium: Bronze
- Location: Museum of Fine Arts, Houston; Houston, Texas, United States; 29.7265°N 95.3906°W

Arch Falls is an outdoor 1981 bronze sculpture by American artist Bryan Hunt, installed at the Lillie and Hugh Roy Cullen Sculpture Garden in the Museum of Fine Arts, Houston in Texas. The sculpture rests on a limestone base. It was gifted by the Charles Engelhard Foundation.

== See also ==
- 1981 in art
- List of public art in Houston
