= Bygones (sculpture) =

Sculpture in Houston, Texas, U.S.

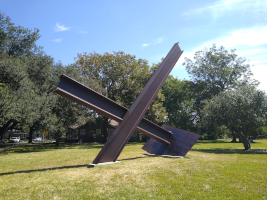
- Bygones installed in the Menil Collection's green space
- Artist: Mark di Suvero
- Year: 1976
- Medium: Cor-ten steel
- Dimensions: 25 ft 11 in × 31 ft 6 in × 14 ft 2 in; 7.9 m × 9.6 m × 4.3 m
- Location: Menil Collection, Houston, Texas, United States
- Coordinates: 29.737586°N 95.397145°W
- Website: Bygones

Bygones is an abstract, geometric sculpture created by Mark di Suvero in 1976, and installed at the Menil Collection in Houston in 1987. It consists of two Cor-ten steel girders and a rectangular steel plate. The girders intersect at almost a 90-degree angle and the structure is stabilized by the base.

== History ==
Bygones was created in 1976, shortly after a turbulent period in di Suvero's career. Having protested the Vietnam War and been arrested twice, di Suvero left the United States in 1971 in self-imposed exile, living and working in Europe until the war's end in 1975. Upon returning, he opened a studio in Petaluma, California and in late 1975 was the subject of an important retrospective at the Whitney Museum of American Art. Bygones was among the first works he created after this return, made in Grand Rapids, Michigan, alongside Motu Viget and parts of Pre Natal Memories, before being temporarily installed near his Petaluma studio.

Around 1978, Dominique de Menil acquired the sculpture for what would become the Menil Collection. Her family's connection to di Suvero had been established during this same period: her son François co-produced, with art historian Barbara Rose, the documentary North Star: Mark di Suvero (1977), which followed di Suvero from his final years of exile through his return to New York. It was during the making of this film that François first met the artist. Dominique de Menil would later write, in a 1984 letter, that Bygones was "one of the great sculptures of its time".

In 1985, the sculpture was loaned to the Storm King Art Center in New York for a major exhibition of di Suvero's work, where it was installed on a sloping hill. In 1987, it was permanently installed at the newly opened Menil Collection in Houston.

== Materials and restoration ==
Cor-ten develops a velvety, rust-colored patina when exposed to alternating humid and dry weather. Houston's high humidity makes maintenance particularly important for Bygones and other artwork made of Cor-ten, because the material tends to rust too much and decay on the inside. In addition to this concern, over the decades the sculpture's concrete pads were slowly sinking into the clay-rich soil, which allowed the Cor-ten to be submerged in rainwater after storms.

In 2015, Bygones underwent an extensive conservation treatment. It was entirely dismantled, cleaned, given a coating to protect it, repaired, and installed on new foundations. This was a large undertaking that involved teams of metal-workers, concrete and landscaping experts, engineers, conservation scientists, and radiographers.

== Other works by di Suvero in the Houston area ==
- Magari (1977), in the Lillie and Hugh Roy Cullen Sculpture Garden at the Museum of Fine Arts, Houston
- Pranath Yama (1978), also seen written as Pranayama, installed in 1982 outside the DeBakey Library and Museum at Baylor College of Medicine
- Po-um (Lyric) (2003), installed in 2013 at Rice University near Moody Center for the Arts

== See also ==
- List of public art in Houston
