= New Forms (sculpture) =

Sculpture in Houston, Texas, U.S.

- Artist: Tony Cragg
- Type: Sculpture
- Medium: Bronze
- Location: Museum of Fine Arts, Houston; Houston, Texas, United States; 29°43′36″N 95°23′25″W
- Owner: Museum of Fine Arts, Houston

New Forms is an outdoor 1991–1992 bronze sculpture by British artist Tony Cragg, installed at the Museum of Fine Arts, Houston's Lillie and Hugh Roy Cullen Sculpture Garden, in the U.S. state of Texas. It was commissioned by the Museum of Fine Arts, Houston and donated by the Schissler Foundation.

== See also ==
- 1992 in art
- List of public art in Houston
