= Two Circle Sentinel =

1961 sculpture by David Smith

- Artist: David Smith
- Year: 1961
- Type: Sculpture
- Medium: Stainless steel
- Location: Museum of Fine Arts, Houston; Houston, Texas, United States; 29°43′35.5″N 95°23′26″W

Two Circle Sentinel is an outdoor 1961 stainless steel sculpture by David Smith, installed at the Museum of Fine Arts, Houston's Lillie and Hugh Roy Cullen Sculpture Garden in the U.S. state of Texas. It was purchased using monetary contributions provided by the Brown Foundation Accessions Endowment Fund in memory of Alice Pratt Brown.

== See also ==
- 1961 in art
- List of public art in Houston
