= Oliver Twist (Guthrie) =

Sculpture in Houston, Texas, U.S.

- Artist: Trace Guthrie
- Year: 1976
- Medium: Bronze sculpture
- Location: Houston, Texas, United States
- 29°43′9.2″N 95°23′18.2″W

Oliver Twist is an outdoor 1976 bronze sculpture by Trace Guthrie, installed in Hermann Park's Miller Outdoor Theatre, Houston, in the U.S. state of Texas. The statue, cast at the Al Shakis Foundry, was donated to the city by Theatre Under the Stars in 1976.

== See also ==
- 1976 in art
- List of public art in Houston
