= Large Standing Woman I =

Sculpture in Houston, Texas, U.S.

- Grande femme debout I (French)
- Artist: Alberto Giacometti
- Year: 1960
- Type: Sculpture
- Medium: Bronze
- Location: Museum of Fine Arts, Houston; 29.7265°N 95.3906°W

Large Standing Woman I (French: Grande femme debout I) is a bronze sculpture created by Alberto Giacometti in 1960.

The outdoor sculpture was previously located at the Lillie and Hugh Roy Cullen Sculpture Garden, but has been relocated to the Nancy and Rich Kinder Building at the Museum of Fine Arts, Houston, located in Houston, Texas.

== See also ==
- 1960 in art
- List of public art in Houston
