= Conversation with the Wind =

Sculpture in Houston, Texas, U.S.

Conversation with the Wind (Colloquio col Vento)
- Artist: Pietro Consagra
- Year: 1962
- Type: Sculpture
- Medium: Steel
- Dimensions: 260 cm × 270 cm (104 in × 107 in × 94 5/8 in)
- Location: Museum of Fine Arts, Houston; Houston, Texas, United States; 29°43′36.8″N 95°23′25.9″W

Conversation with the Wind (Colloquio col Vento), or simply Conversation with the Wind, is a 1962 kinetic steel sculpture by Italian artist Pietro Consagra, installed at the Museum of Fine Arts, Houston's (MFAH) Lillie and Hugh Roy Cullen Sculpture Garden in the U.S. state of Texas. The sculpture measures 104 × 107 × 94 5/8 in. (264.2 × 271.8 × 240.4 cm). It was exhibited in Spoleto, Italy in 1962, and purchased by MFAH in 1963.

According to his daughter, Consagra proposed painting the badly rusted sculpture for restorative purposes.

== See also ==
- 1962 in art
- List of public art in Houston
