= Untitled (Shapiro, 1990) =

Sculpture by Joel Shapiro

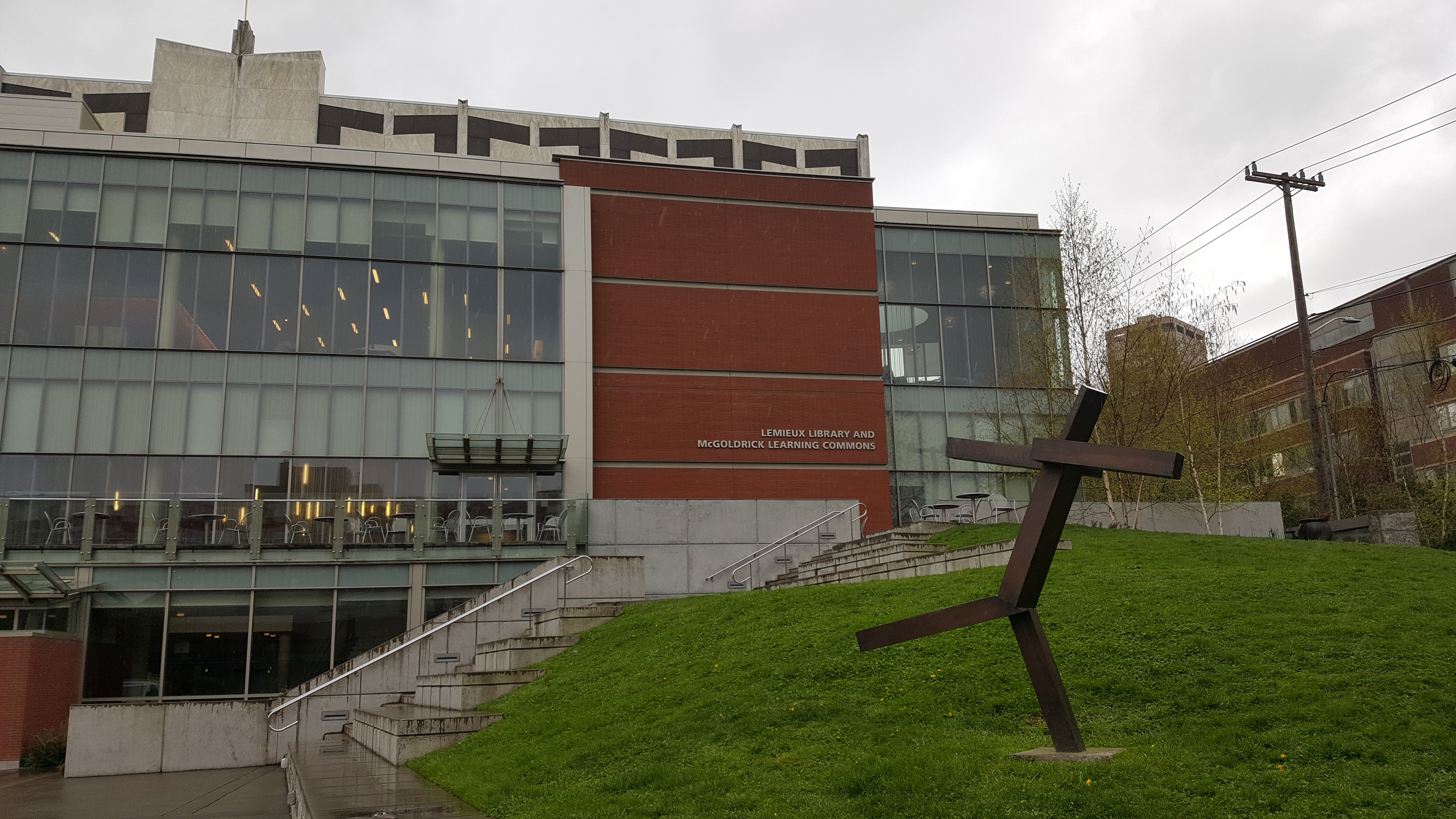
- Sculpture installed at Seattle University
- Artist: Joel Shapiro
- Year: 1990
- 47°36′32.3″N 122°19′5.6″W

Untitled is an abstract 1990 sculpture by Joel Shapiro. Bronze edition 4/4 is installed in the Lillie and Hugh Roy Cullen Sculpture Garden, as part of the collection of the Museum of Fine Arts, Houston. Another bronze copy is installed on the Seattle University campus.

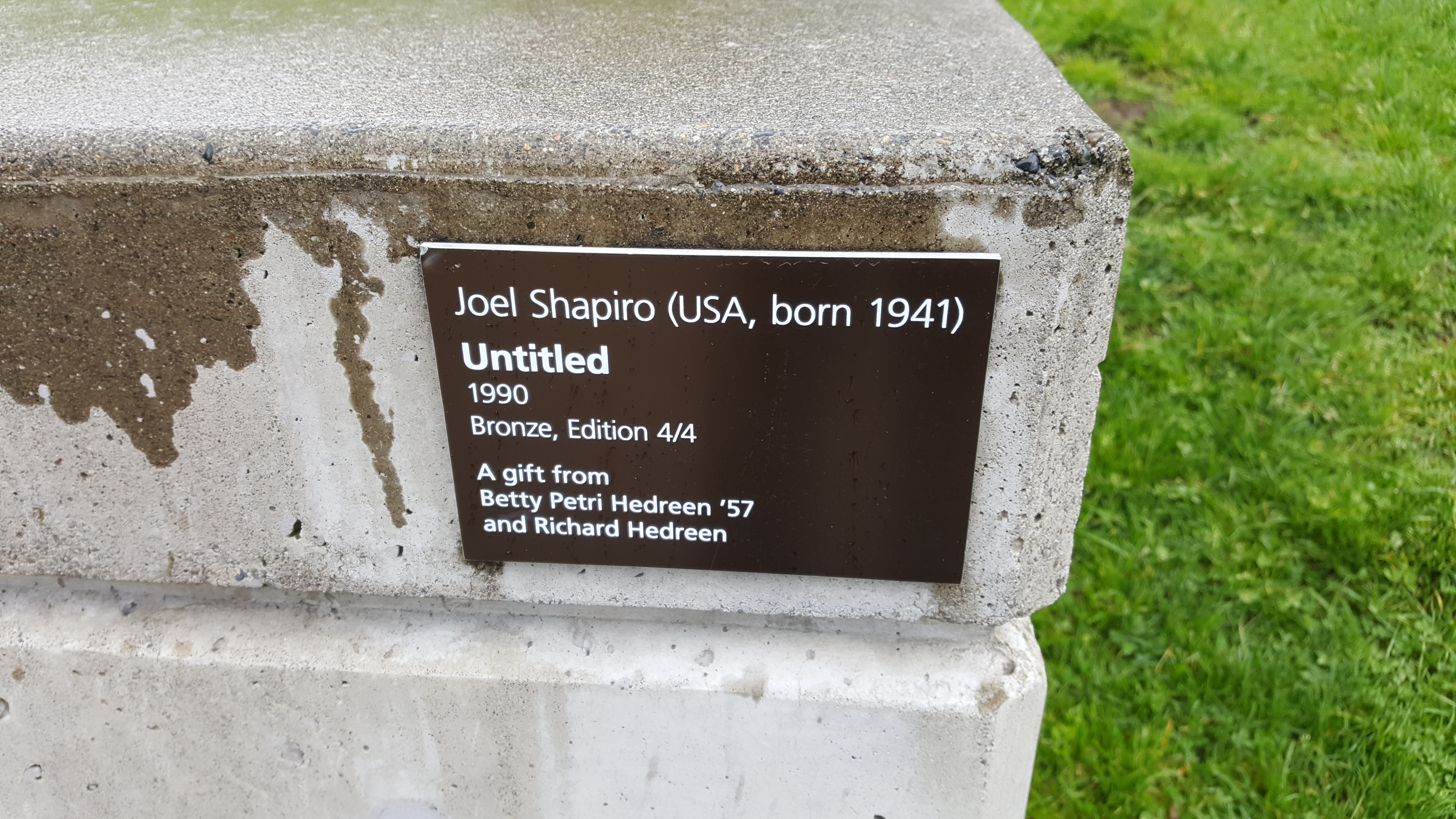
Plaque for the sculpture installed at Seattle University

== See also ==
- List of public art in Houston
