= The Dance (sculpture) =

Sculpture in Houston, Texas, U.S.

- Artist: Linda Ridgway
- Year: 2000
- Medium: Bronze sculpture
- Dimensions: 210 cm × 593 cm × 120 cm (82 in × 233.5 in × 48 in)
- Location: Museum of Fine Arts, Houston, Houston, Texas, United States
- 29°43′36.4″N 95°23′26.3″W

The Dance is an outdoor 2000 bronze sculpture by Linda Ridgway, installed at the Museum of Fine Arts, Houston's Lillie and Hugh Roy Cullen Sculpture Garden in the U.S. state of Texas.

== Description and history ==
The sculpture measures 82 × 233 1/2 × 48 in. (208.3 × 593.1 × 121.9 cm). Ridgway cast the artwork from a grapevine in her backyard.

The work was commissioned by the museum "in celebration of the life of Karen H. Susman from the partners and spouses at Susman Godfrey L.L.P.". It was unveiled in a private ceremony in 2000.

== Reception ==
In 2000, Jeanne Claire van Ryzin of the Austin American-Statesman said the artwork "is a delicate piece like so much of Ridgway's other work".

In 2016, Culture Trip's Lucy Andia wrote, "The connection between art and nature is no more explicit than in Linda Ridgway’s, The Dance which was cast from a grapevine that grew in her own backyard. Positioned as though it is freely crawling up the wall, this sculpture serves as a reminder that art can be natural in the same way that nature can be art. Here Ridgway has articulated the trend of imitation of the organic that occurred in the 1980s and 1990s in such ideal surroundings that it is hard to imagine this sculpture existing anywhere else."

In 2018, the Houston Chronicle's Molly Glentzer said the sculpture "could be mistaken for a dormant vine on a wall" and wrote, "But Linda Ridgway's delicate site-specific piece always demands a look. It tricks my gardening eyes even though I know what it is, clinging to a wall like a dormant grapevine."

== See also ==
- 2000 in art
- List of public art in Houston
