= Quarantania I =

Sculpture by Louise Bourgeois

- Artist: Louise Bourgeois
- Type: Sculpture
- Medium: Bronze
- Location: Museum of Fine Arts, Houston; Houston, Texas, United States; 29°43′35.5″N 95°23′26.5″W

Quarantania I is an outdoor sculpture by Louise Bourgeois, installed at the Museum of Fine Arts, Houston's Lillie and Hugh Roy Cullen Sculpture Garden in the U.S. state of Texas. The bronze sculpture was designed during 1947–1953/1981 and cast in 1984.

== See also ==
- List of artworks by Louise Bourgeois
- List of public art in Houston
