= Linda Ridgway =

American artist (born 1947)

- Born: 1947 (age 78–79); Jeffersonville, Indiana, U.S.
- Education: Louisville School of Art (BFA); Tulane University (MFA)
- Known for: Sculpture

Linda Ridgway (born 1947) is an American artist in Dallas, TX known for sculpting and printmaking works. Her focus is on themes of femininity, tradition, and heritage. Ridgway is known for her bronze wall reliefs.

== Early life and education ==
Ridgway was born in Jeffersonville, Indiana. She received a B.F.A. from the Louisville School of Art and an M.F.A. from Tulane University.

== Style and work ==
An example of Ridgway's art is her piece How did you dare, which was inspired by Alice in Wonderland. In it Ridgway takes a series of prints she had made at Flatbed Press with Katherine Broomberry. Her art, as she described it, was sculpted paper, and she added the quote "How do you dare" from Shakespeare. With multiple printings and stains of young girls' dresses, she made art and said "sometimes the best start is the accident".

== Career ==
Ridgway has participated in various solo and group exhibitions including Linda Ridgway: A Survey, Poetics of Form at the Glassell School of Art at the Museum of Fine Arts, Houston, Texas and the Dallas Museum of Art, Texas in 1997 and 1998; and One Hundred Years: The Permanent Collection of the Modern Art Museum of Fort Worth at the Modern Art Museum of Fort Worth.

Ridgway was trained as a printmaker, but is best known for her delicate sculptures based on plants and clothing. Her vine-like bronze sculpture The Dance demonstrates this synthesis of bronze and plants. Her work is held in the public collections of the Dallas Museum of Art, the El Paso Museum of Art, the Modern Art Museum of Fort Worth, the Museum of Fine Arts, Houston, The Phillips Collection (Washington DC).

On June 26, 2010, Ridgway participated in the Nasher Sculpture Center's 360 Speakers Series in which various sculptors appear to have conversations and lectures on the ever-changing definition of sculpture. The lecture itself was recorded and posted to the Nasher Sculpture Center's Youtube page.

== Personal life ==
Ridgway lives and works in Dallas, Texas. She is heavily influenced by her personal life and identity as a mother, daughter, and friend.
