= Adam (Bourdelle) =

Sculpture by Antoine Bourdelle

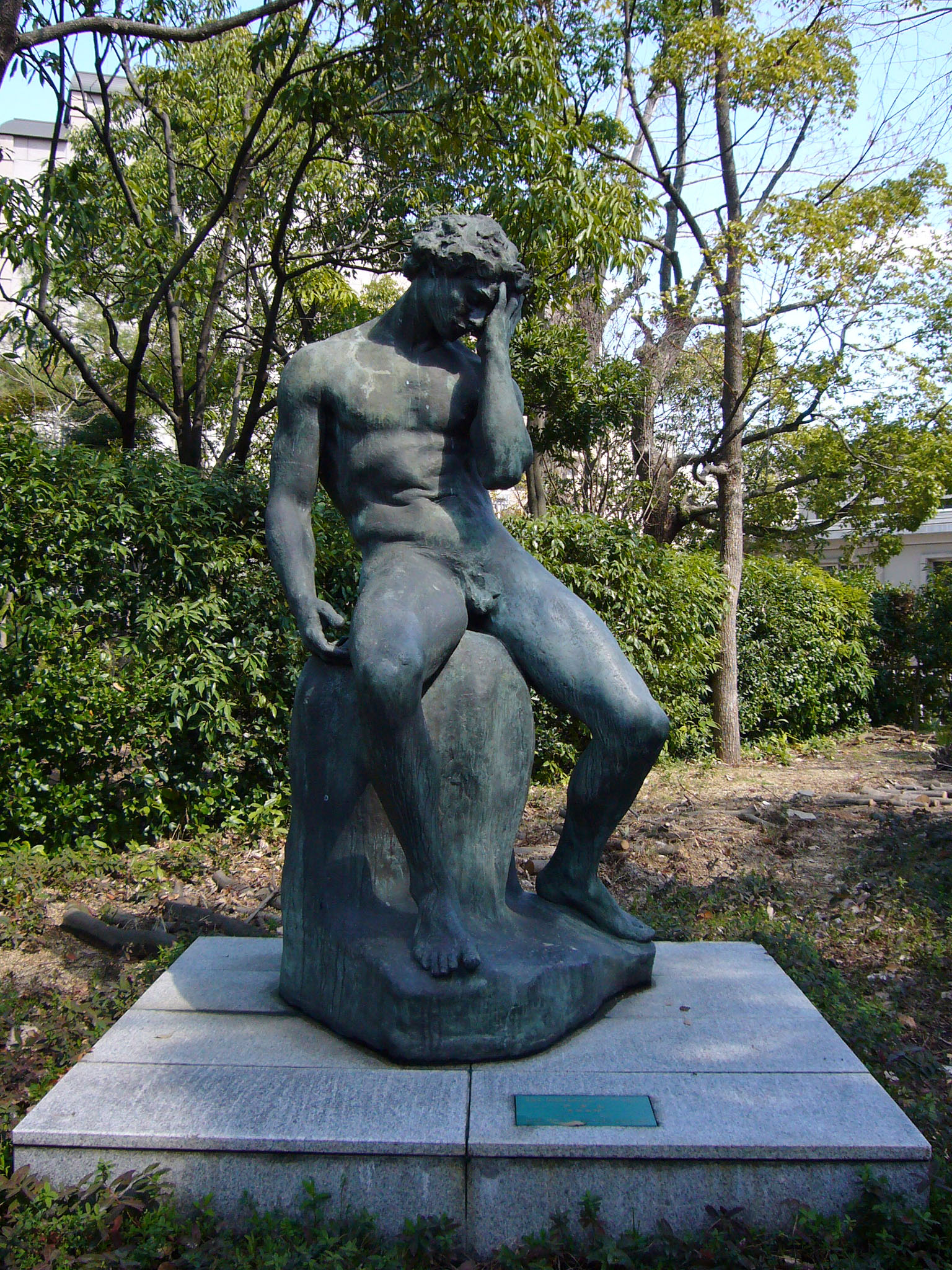
- The sculpture in Kobe, Japan
- Artist: Antoine Bourdelle
- Year: 1889
- Type: Sculpture
- Medium: Bronze
- Location: Museum of Fine Arts, Houston; Houston; 29°43′35.8″N 95°23′25.1″W

Adam is an 1889 sculpture by Antoine Bourdelle.

== Houston ==
The bronze sculpture is installed at the Lillie and Hugh Roy Cullen Sculpture Garden in Houston, Texas, in the United States.

== See also ==
- List of works by Antoine Bourdelle
