= Joseph Havel =

American sculptor

Joseph Havel (born 1954) is a postmodernist American sculptor who was born in Minneapolis, Minnesota. Havel earned a BFA in Studio Arts from the University of Minnesota and an MFA from Pennsylvania State University. He received a National Endowment for the Arts Artist Fellowship in 1987 and a Louis Comfort Tiffany Artist's Fellowship in 1995. He lives and works in Houston, Texas and is the former Director of the Glassell School of Art.

His work is in public collections in the U.S. and abroad including:

- The Museum of Fine Arts Houston
- The Menil Collection, Houston
- The Whitney Museum, New York
- The Dallas Museum of Art
- The Federal Reserve, Dallas
- The Modern Art Museum of Fort Worth
- The Academy of Art, Honolulu
- Laumeier Sculpture Park, St. Louis
- The Centre Pompidou, Paris
- The French Ministry of Culture, Paris
- Portland Museum, Fundacion Rouge, Paris
- Stedelijk Museum voor Actuelle Kunst, Ghent, Belgium

== Representation ==
Joseph Havel is represented in Houston by Pazda Butler Gallery, Talley Dunn Gallery in Dallas, Texas, and Anthony Meier Fine Arts in San Francisco, California.

== Works ==
- Exhaling Pearls (1993), Houston, Texas
