= Cybele (sculpture) =

Sculpture by Auguste Rodin

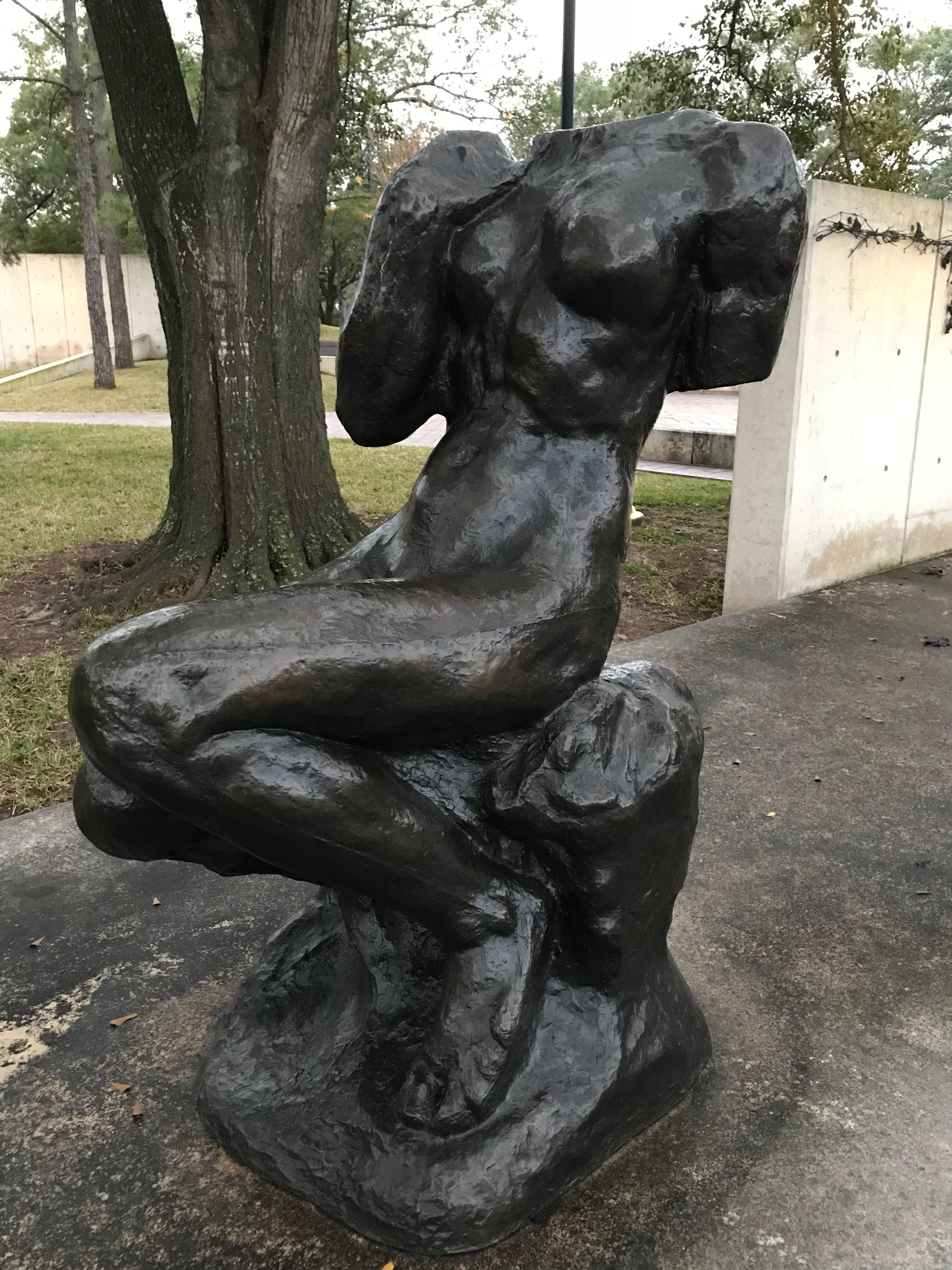
- A bronze cast in Houston's Lillie and Hugh Roy Cullen Sculpture Garden in 2019
- Artist: Auguste Rodin
- Year: c. 1889–1890 / Enlarged 1904
- Type: Sculpture
- Dimensions: 160 cm × 79 cm × 120 cm (63 in × 31 in × 46 in)

Cybele is a sculpture by French artist Auguste Rodin. It is one of the first of Rodin's partial figures known as "fragments" to be displayed as sculpture in its own right, rather than an incomplete study.

== History ==
Inspired by fragments of Greek art and incomplete work by Michelangelo, Rodin modeled a small study of a headless, seated woman. Following a scandal in 1877 when Rodin was wrongly accused of casting The Age of Bronze from life, the artist usually preferred to make sculptures that were smaller than life. Rodin's model was one of his favorites, Anna Abruzzesi, one of a pair of sisters he often used. Art critic Georges Grappe dated the sculpture to 1889 and stated without providing a source that it was a study for The Gates of Hell.

In 1904, Rodin's assistant Henri Lebossé created an enlarged plaster version of the work using a machine invented by Achille Collas. This monumental work was displayed as A Figure at the 1905 Salon de la Société Nationale des Beaux-Arts in Paris. At that time, the sculpture was informally known by Rodin's friends and workers as Abruzzesi Seated after the woman who served as the model.

It wasn't until 1914 that the work acquired its current name, Cybele, after the fertile Phrygian mother goddess. A bronze cast of the enlarged version was exhibited as Cybele at an exhibition at Grosvenor House in London that year. The ample figure of the sculpture may have suggested the title to Rodin.

== Copies ==
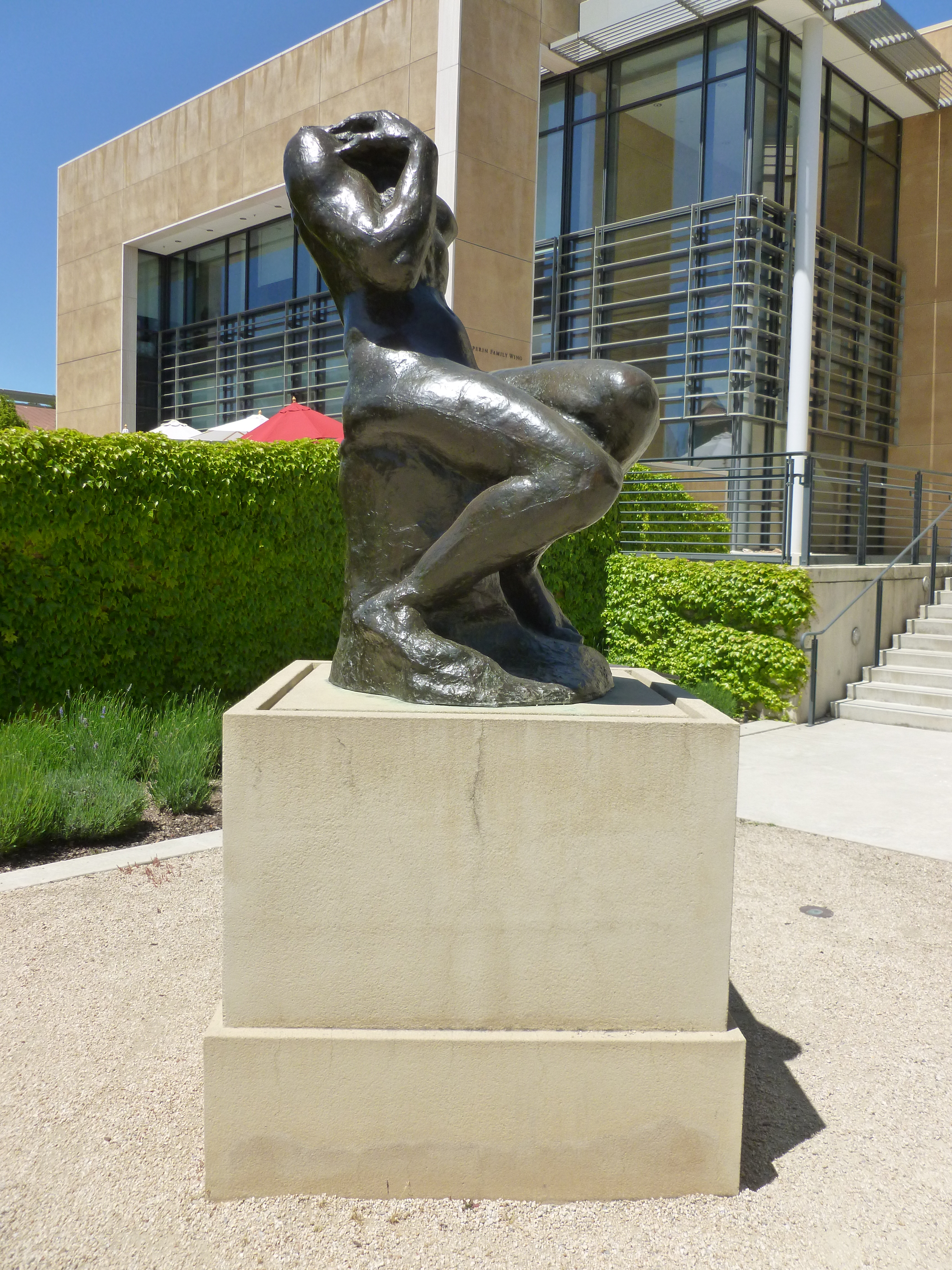
The statue at Stanford University in 2011

The plaster version displayed at the 1905 Salon is now at the Musée des Beaux-Arts de Bordeaux. Many bronze casts have been made that are displayed at locations including:

- Victoria and Albert Museum, London (This 1914 cast is the only cast made during Rodin's life.)
- Musée Rodin, Paris (1981 cast)
- Brooklyn Museum, Brooklyn, New York (1981 cast)
- Iris & B. Gerald Cantor Center for Visual Arts, Stanford University, Stanford, California (1981 cast)
- Lillie and Hugh Roy Cullen Sculpture Garden, Houston, Texas (1982 cast)
- North Carolina Museum of Art, Raleigh, North Carolina, (1987 cast)

== See also ==
- 1890 in art
- List of public art in Houston
- List of sculptures by Auguste Rodin
