= The Crab (sculpture) =

Sculpture in Houston, Texas, U.S.

- Artist: Alexander Calder
- Year: 1962
- Type: Sculpture
- Medium: Steel
- Subject: Crab
- Dimensions: 3.0 m × 6.1 m × 3.0 m (120 in × 240 in × 120 in)
- Location: Museum of Fine Arts, Houston, Houston, Texas, United States; 29.7259°N 95.390166°W
- Owner: Museum of Fine Arts, Houston

The Crab is an outdoor 1962 painted steel sculpture by Alexander Calder, installed outside the Museum of Fine Arts, Houston, in the U.S. state of Texas. It measures 120 inches (3.0 m) x 240 inches (6.1 m) x 120 inches (3.0 m) inches.

== See also ==
- 1962 in art
- List of Alexander Calder public works
- List of public art in Houston
