= Hannah Holliday Stewart =

American sculptor

- Born: January 23, 1924; Birmingham, AL, United States
- Died: February 23, 2010 (aged 86); Albuquerque, NM
- Occupation: sculptor

Hannah Holliday Stewart (January 25, 1924 – February 23, 2010) was an American abstract sculptor who was a prominent member of the Houston art scene and exhibited across the United States, including at the Smithsonian Institution. She was part of a generation of second-wave feminist artists who incorporated ancient myths and goddess imagery into their work, depicting the woman as a dominant player in a new societal order. Twenty years before her death, Stewart moved to Albuquerque, New Mexico to live in seclusion. She continued to produce sculptures, primarily in bronze, until her death in 2010.

Stewart was born in Birmingham, Alabama. She grew up in a family of wealthy socialites, but quickly shed this identity upon leaving home. After getting her graduate degree from the Cranbrook Academy of Art, she moved to Houston. There she received a public art commission for a sculpture in Hermann Park, an unlikely honor for an abstract female sculptor at the time and the first of many monumental works she would produce throughout her career.

The artist was inspired by both mythology and science. In a handwritten statement discovered in her personal files after her death she wrote:

(An) early interest in natural forces has sustained me throughout my life as a sculptor. My goal is to render visible the hidden realities of pent-up contained energy. The direct fields of reference are Sacred Geometry, Astronomy, Myth & Physics ... Each Sculpture is an energy form, the movement arrested in space, a form sustaining an energy. My work is a response to these patterns and delineations and communicates with viewers through the universality of symbolism and form.

The sculptor's work is characterized by dynamic ascending lines and rough planes. The titles of her abstract works and the subject matter of her figurative works often refer to mythical and historic female heroes, from Egyptian queens to Greek goddesses.

Stewart's oeuvre explores ideas of the sacred feminine, intersecting with the ideologies of contemporary female artists including Ana Mendieta, Dona Henes and Carolee Schneemann. She gained national renown as part of this new generation of women artists, exhibiting at the Smithsonian Institution, the San Francisco Museum of Art, the High Museum of Art, the Dallas Museum of Fine Arts and more.

About two decades before her death, Stewart abruptly left Houston for Albuquerque, a move that remains a mystery to many of her friends in Texas. Outside of Houston, Stewart remains largely forgotten by the art establishment. Still, the artist was hugely influential in her time. In her book "American Women Sculptors", Charlotte Streifer Rubinstein wrote:

Breaking from religious expressions in which the male principle acts as a form of oppressive domination, a number of women artists... turned for inspiration to goddess imagery and ancient female deities. In sculpture, painting, and ritual, they revived the image of woman as shaman, deity, powerful creator and generator of life.
