= Tony Cragg =

Anglo-German sculptor (born 1949)

Sir Tony Cragg CBE RA
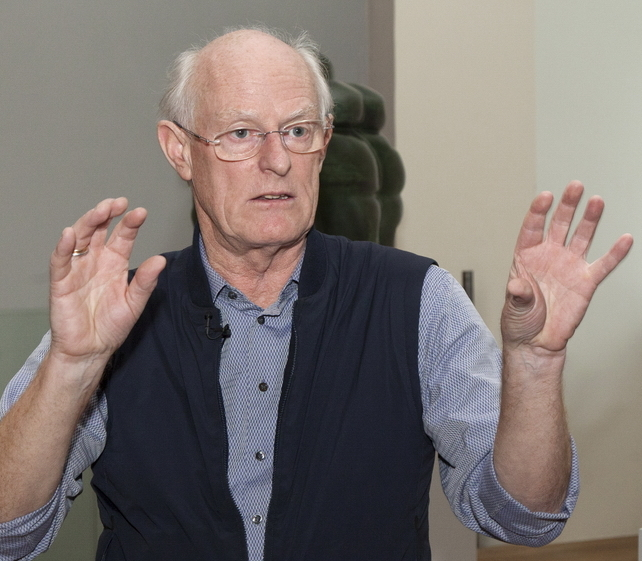
- Cragg in 2016
- Born: 9 April 1949 (age 77); Liverpool, England, UK
- Known for: Sculpture
- Spouse: Tatjana Verhasselt
- Awards: Turner Prize (1988) Grand Cross 1st Class Order of Merit of the Federal Republic of Germany (2012)
- Elected: Royal Academy
- Website: www.tony-cragg.com

Sir Anthony Douglas Cragg (born 9 April 1949) is an Anglo-German sculptor, resident in Wuppertal, Germany since 1977.

== Early life and training ==
Tony Cragg was born in Liverpool. His father was an aerospace engineer. He first worked as a lab technician for the British Rubber Producers Research Association after high school. He studied art at Gloucestershire College of Arts and Technology, Cheltenham, from 1968 to 1970, and painted at the Wimbledon School of Art, London, from 1970 to 1973. The same year he went on to study sculpture at the Royal College of Art, London, completing an MA in 1977.

He moved in 1977 to Wuppertal, the home of his first wife. Where there were also cheap studio spaces and exhibition organisers looking for new artists. He was fascinated by the importance of sculpture in Germany, and struck by German seriousness.

Cragg married twice and has 4 children. His second wife is the artist Tatjana Verhasselt.

== Career ==
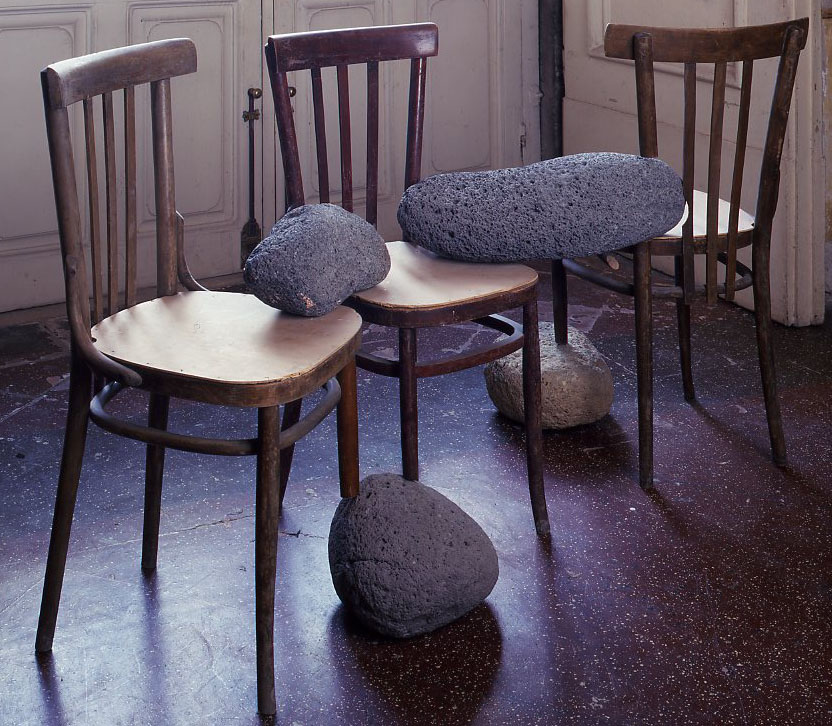
Tony Cragg, Senza titolo, 1983, "Terrae Motus" collection, Royal Palace of Caserta

Tony Cragg's early work involved site-specific installations of found objects and discarded materials.

From the mid-1970s through to the early 1980s he presented assemblages in primary structures (as in his first mature piece, the 1975 Stack) as well as in colourful, representational reliefs on the floors and walls of gallery spaces (as in Red Indian of 1982–83). Cragg constructed these early works by arranging individual fragments of mixed materials, often according to their artificial colours and profiles, so as to form larger images.

In 1977 Cragg moved to Wuppertal, Germany and had several solo exhibitions including Lisson Gallery, London (1979); Lützowstraße Situation, Berlin (1979) and Künstlerhaus Weidenallee, Hamburg (1979). He also exhibited in seminal group shows including the Silver Jubilee Sculpture Show, Battersea Park, London (1977); Europa-Kunst der 80er Jahre, Stuttgart (1979); Kunst in Europa na '68, Museum van Hedendaagse Kunst, Gent (1980) and L'art degli anni Settanta/Aperto '80, Venice Biennale (1980).

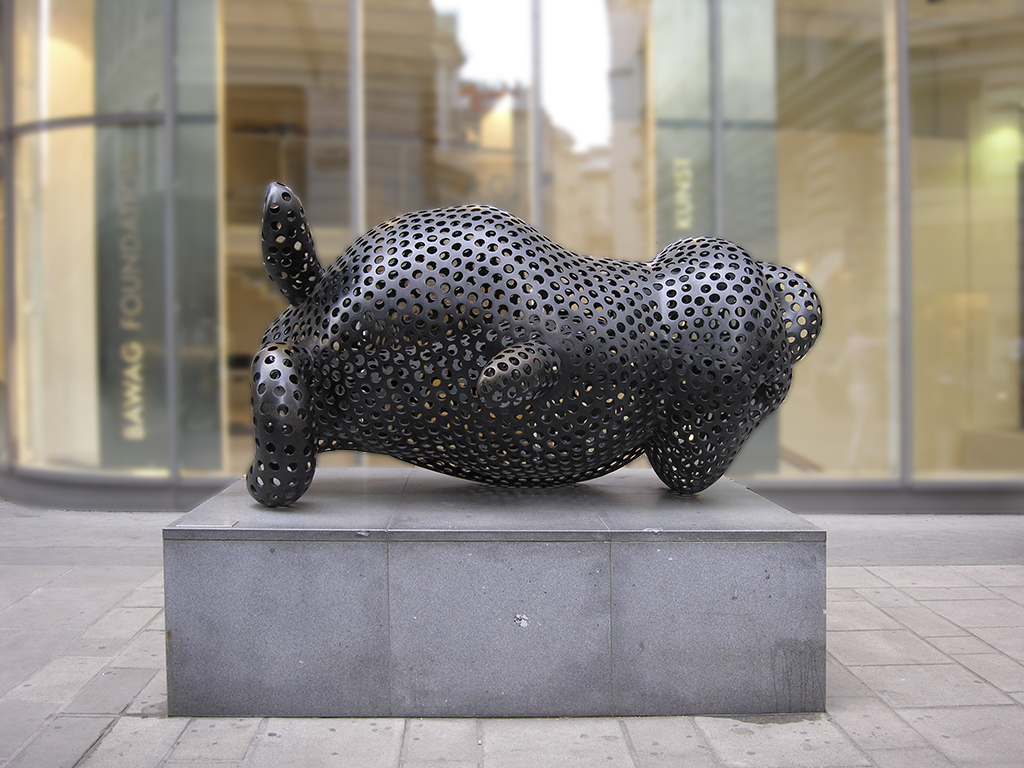
Ferryman, bronze, 1997

In 1981 he created "Britain Seen from the North", considered a signature early work, made of multi-coloured scraps of various materials assembled in relief on the wall. The piece depicts the outline of the island of Great Britain, orientated sideways so that Northern Britain is positioned to the left. The island is scrutinized by a figure, representing Cragg himself, who looks at his native country from the position of an outsider. The piece is often interpreted as commenting on the social and economic difficulties that Britain was facing under Thatcherism, which had particular effect in the north. This work was first exhibited in the large upstairs space at the Whitechapel Art gallery in London in 1981 and is now in the Tate collection.

In the early 1980s Cragg gradually moved away from installation art and began to examine more closely the individual objects used as parts of his larger constellations. This was the beginning of his engagement and experimentation with the properties and possibilities of a wide range of more permanent materials in the form of wood, plaster, stone, fiberglass, Kevlar, stainless steel, cast iron and bronze. During this time Cragg exhibited at Arnolfini Gallery, Bristol (1980); Whitechapel Art Gallery, London (1980); Von der Heydt-Museum, Wuppertal (1981); Institute of Contemporary Art, London (1982); Documenta 7, Kassel (1982) and the Hayward and Serpentine Galleries, London (1983). Since then Cragg has exhibited extensively at many of world's most important art institutions.

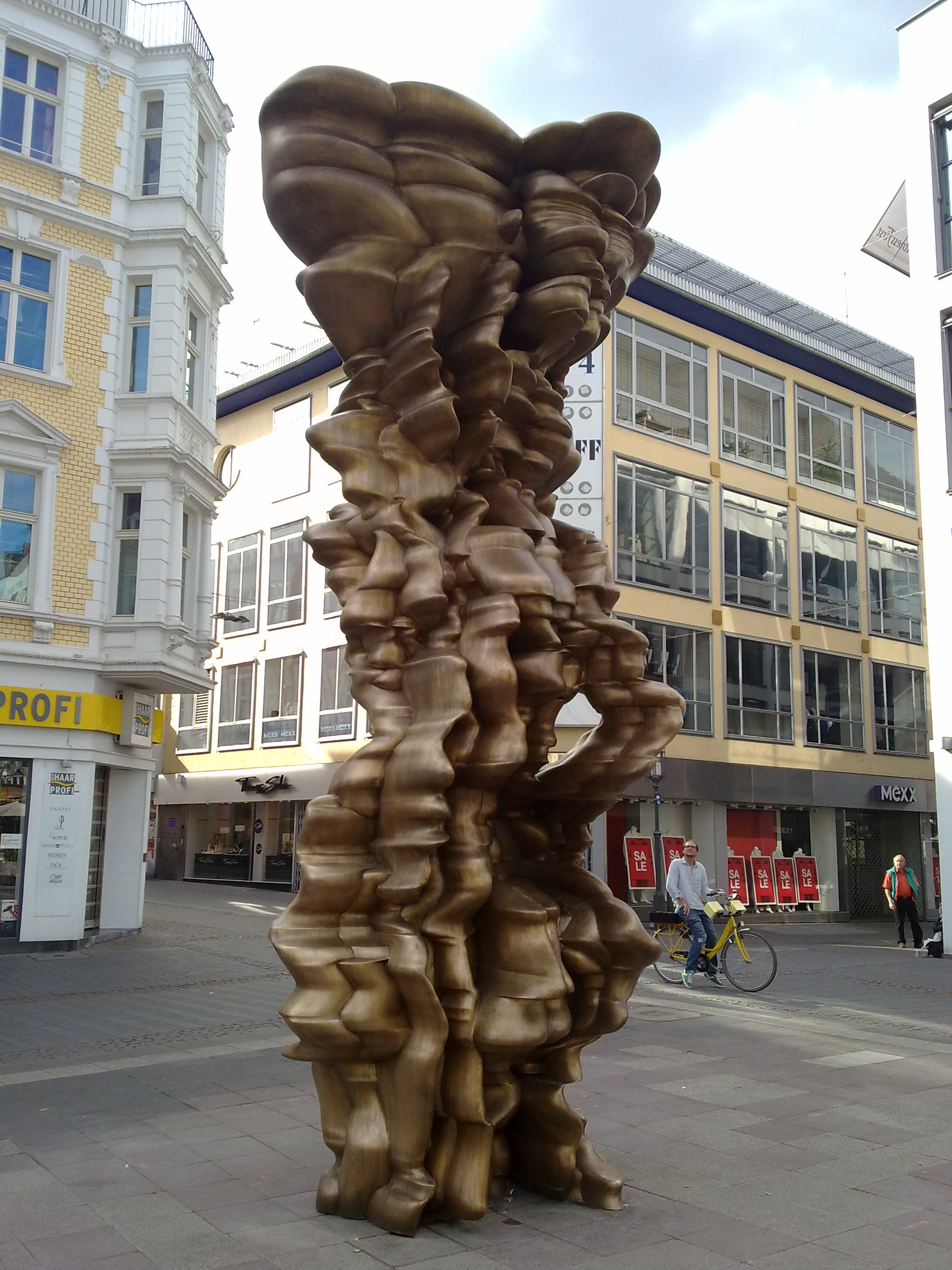
Mean Average, 2014, in the Remigiusplatz, Bonn, Germany

In 1988 Cragg received the Turner Prize at the Tate Gallery in London, represented Britain at the 42nd Venice Biennale (1988) and was appointed Professor at the Kunstakademie Düsseldorf (1988–2001).

Throughout the 1990s Cragg continued to develop two larger groups of work that have sustained his production up to the present: the "Early Forms" and the "Rational Beings". The Early Forms series investigate the possibilities of manipulating everyday, familiar containers and the ways in which they can morph into and around one another in space. The sculptures derive their profiles and contours from simple, thick-walled vessels such as chemistry vessels, plastic bottles and mortars. The surface of these initial objects are extended and contorted until new, sculpturally independent forms of movement arise. Through these processes of manipulation the initial objects develop new lines and contours, positive and negatively curving surfaces and volumes, protrusions and deep recessing folds. The broad field of containers and vessels used function as metaphors for cell, organ, organism or body. The Early Forms can be characterized as forms transmutating along a bilaterally curved axis, often with organic, even figurative, qualities. The Rational Beings are describable as organic looking forms often made of carbon fibre on a core of polystyrene. These sculptures derive their forms from the contours of gestural drawings, which Cragg then translates into the third dimension using thick, circular or oval discs which are superimposed (often vertically), glued together and covered with a skin.

During the 1990s he exhibited at the 45th Venice Biennale (1993); the "Terrae Motus" collection at the Royal Palace of Caserta, Italy (1994); The National Gallery, Prague (1995); MNAM, Centre Georges Pompidou, Paris (1996); MACBA, Barcelona (1997) and the Royal Academy, London (1999). In the early 2000s Cragg was awarded the Shakespeare Prize (2001) and the Piepenbrock Prize for Sculptures (2002). He was appointed Commander of the Order of the British Empire (CBE) (2002), Honorary Doctor of the Royal College of Art, London (2009), Professor at the Universität der Künste, Berlin (2001–2006), and began a Professorship at the Kunstakademie Düsseldorf (2006). Among many major solo shows, Cragg exhibited at Tate Gallery Liverpool (2000); MACRO Museum of Contemporary Art, Rome (2003); and The Central House of Artists, Moscow (2005).

In 2011 Cragg exhibited at the Musée du Louvre in Paris, the Scottish National Gallery in Edinburgh and in 2012 at CAFA Museum in Beijing. In 2016, the State Hermitage Museum in Saint Petersburg presented Tony Cragg: Sculptures and Drawings. His sculpture Accurate Figure is currently on display in the garden at the Nasher Sculpture Center in Dallas, Texas. Amongst new developments in Cragg's work is an increase in sculptures that can be exhibited outdoors; more works wrought from bronze, steel, stone, wood and glass; as well as a vigorous return to his initial interest in art – that of drawing.

Following Brexit he became a German Citizen. He stated that he had found his life in Germany and "wouldn't like to experience any disadvantages in the future either".

== Waldfrieden Sculpture Park & the Cragg Foundation ==
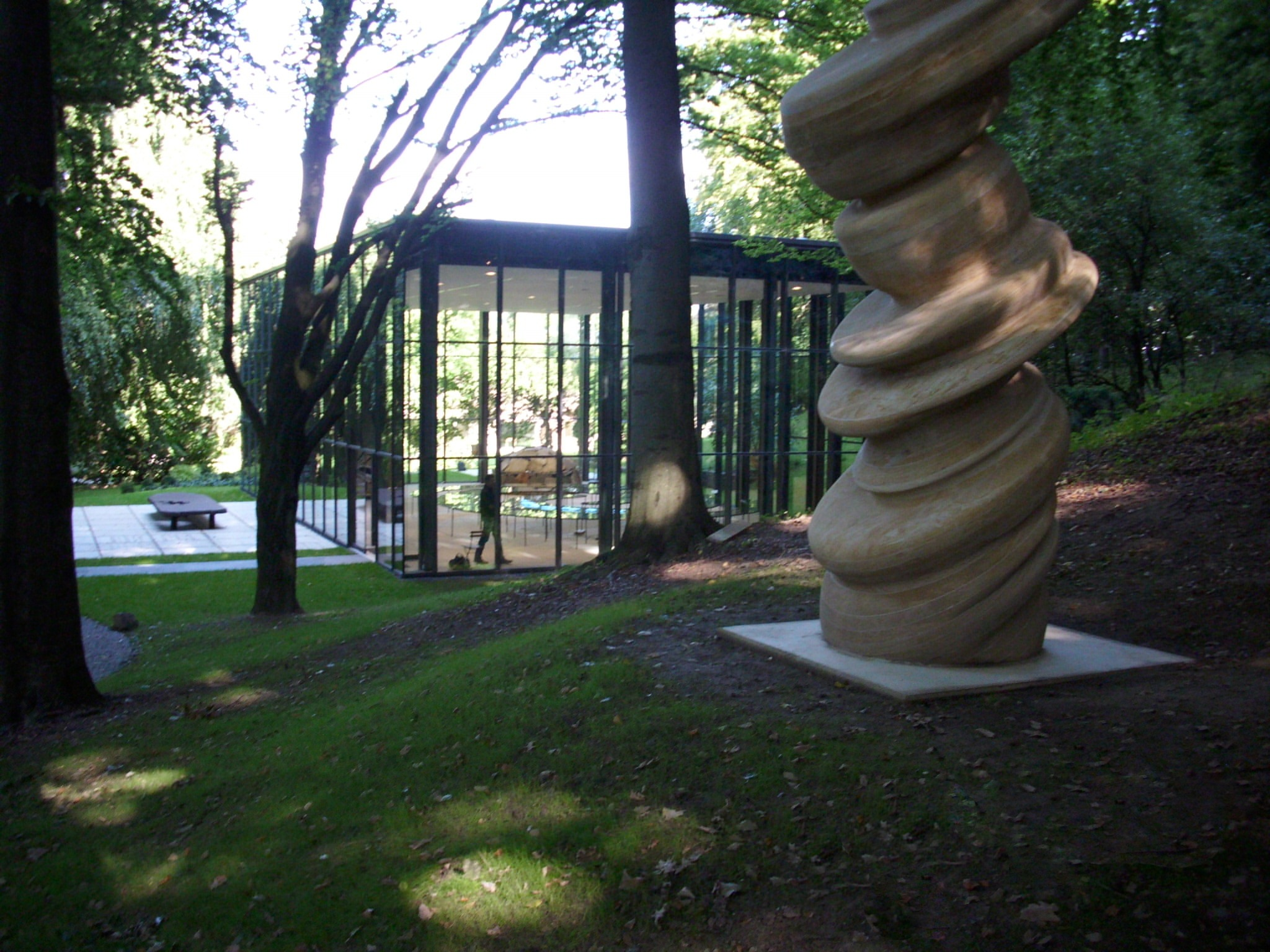
Waldfrieden Sculpture Park

The Cragg Foundation is a non-profit general foundation based in Wuppertal. It was founded in 2005 by the Cragg family and incorporated on 13 December 2005. It includes Tatjana Cragg as chairperson, Tony Cragg as deputy chairperson and Michael Brämer. Its foundation purpose is "Art and culture – in general". The foundation runs the 25 acre Waldfrieden Sculpture Park in the Barmer district of Hesselnberg, Wuppertal. There is a house and 2 other exhibition buildings in a wooded park. The park opened in 2008. There are about 40 outdoor sculptures by various artists including Tony Cragg, Henry Moore, Jaume Plensa, Thomas Schütte, Richard Deacon, Eva Hild, Bogomir Ecker, Hubert Kiecol, Hede Bühl and Markus Lüpertz. There are temporary exhibitions, and a music and lecture programme.

== Art market ==
The highest price reached by one of his sculptures in the art market was by Constant Change (2005), who sold by £849,063 ($1,047,445), at Bonhams, on 3 October 2019.

== Recognition, awards ==
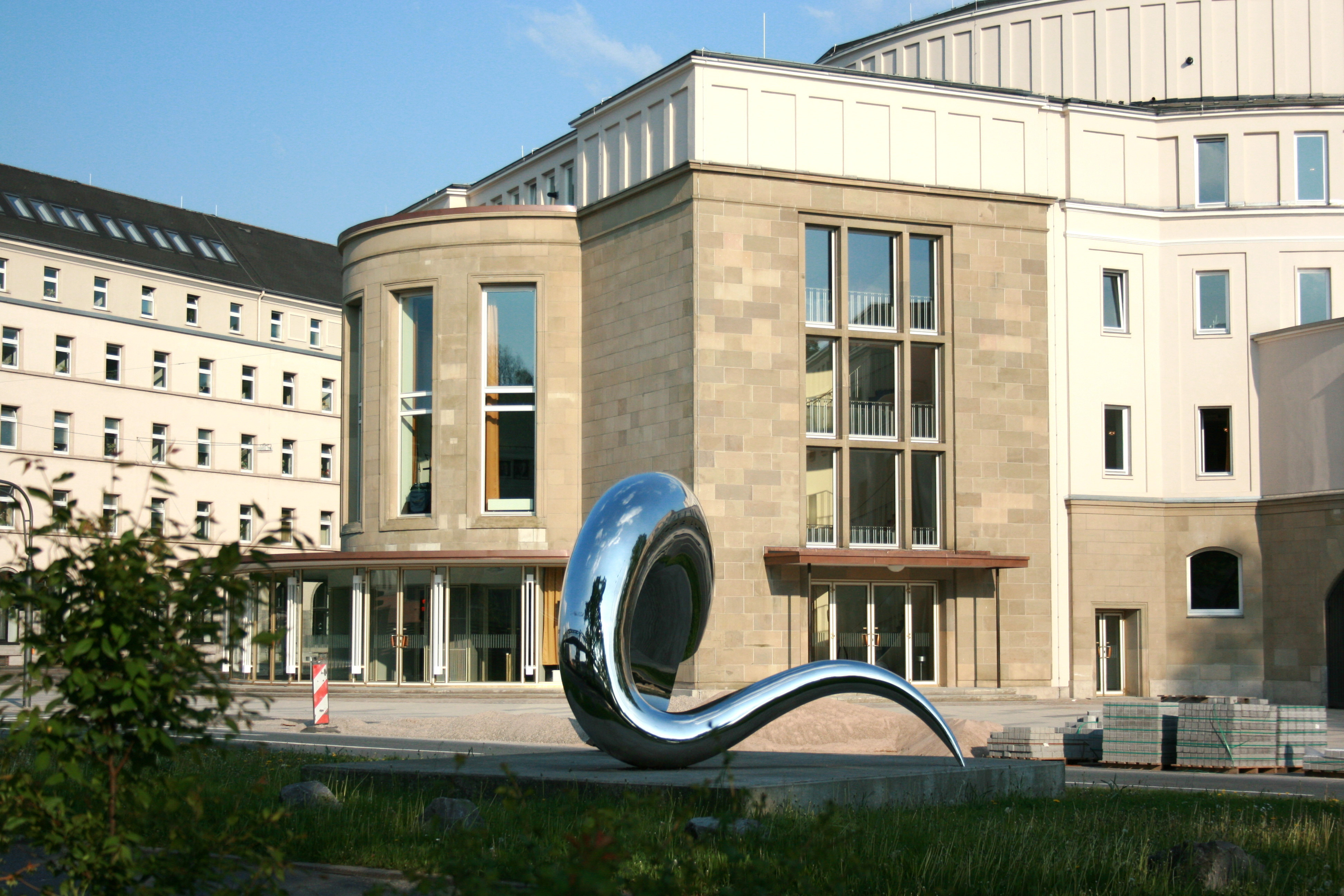
"I'm alive" sculpture in Wuppertal

Cragg was selected to represent Britain at the 43rd Venice Biennale in 1988, and won the Turner Prize in the same year. In the early 1990s, Cragg was awarded the Chevalier des Arts Lettres (1992) and appointed Royal Academician in London (1994). In 2001 he received the annual Shakespeare Prize of the Alfred Toepfer Foundation of Hamburg. He was made a CBE for services to art in the 2002 New Year Honours List, and also won the Piepenbrock Prize for Sculpture in that year. In 2007, he received the Praemium Imperiale for sculpture of the Imperial House of Japan for the Japan Art Association. Since 2010, Cragg has been appointed Honorary Fellow of University of the Arts London (2012); awarded Artist's Medal of Honor of the Hermitage, Russia (2012) as well as the Grand Cross 1st Class Order of Merit of the Federal Republic of Germany (2012). In 2018 he was awarded the Merit of North Rhine-Westphalia; the Lifetime Achievement in Contemporary Sculpture Award. In 2014 he was awarded honorary citizenship of Wuppertal.

In the 2016 Birthday Honours Cragg was created a Knight Bachelor for services to visual arts and UK–German relations.

== Gallery ==
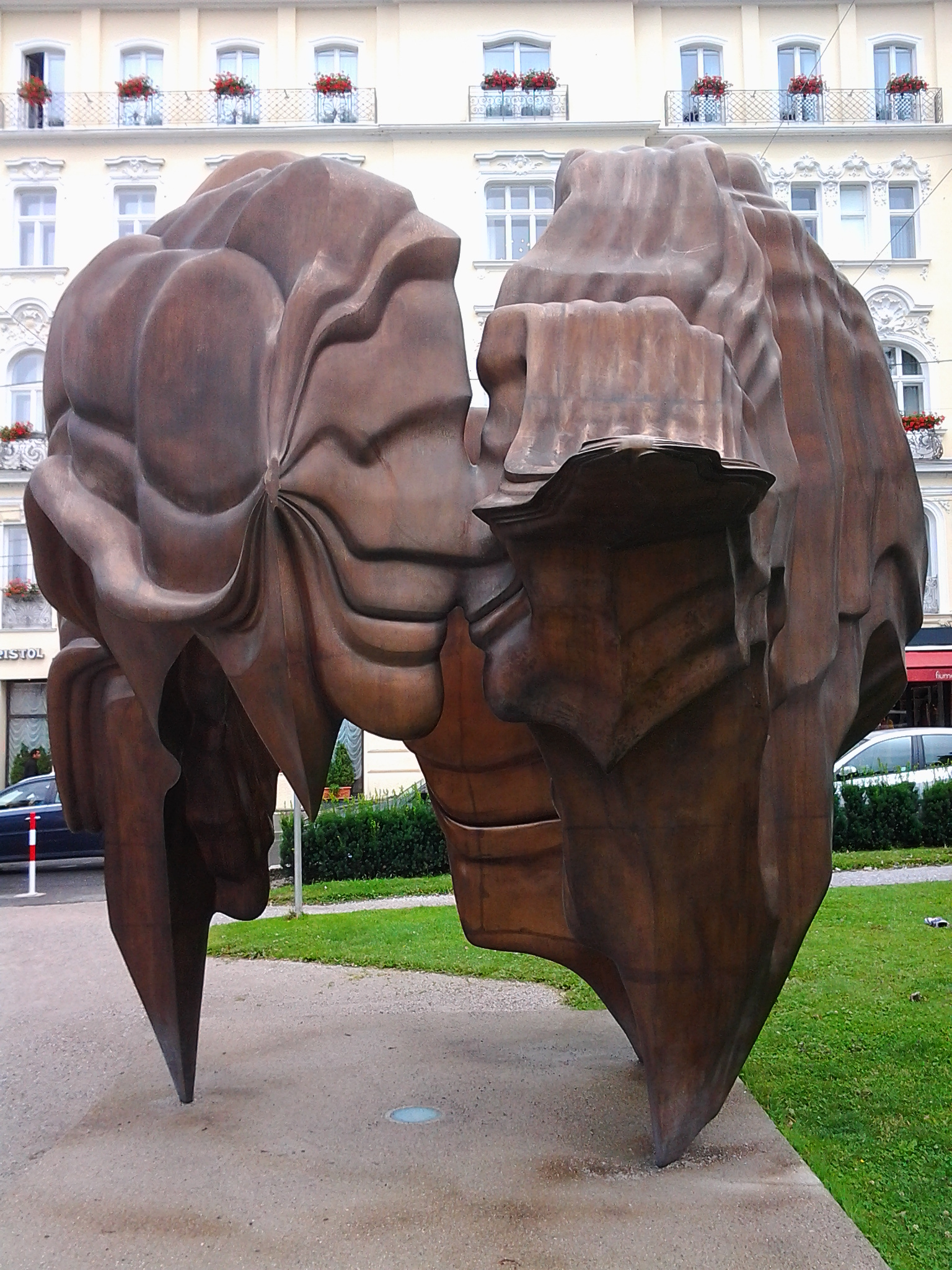
Caldera (2008), in the Makartplatz, Salzburg, Austria

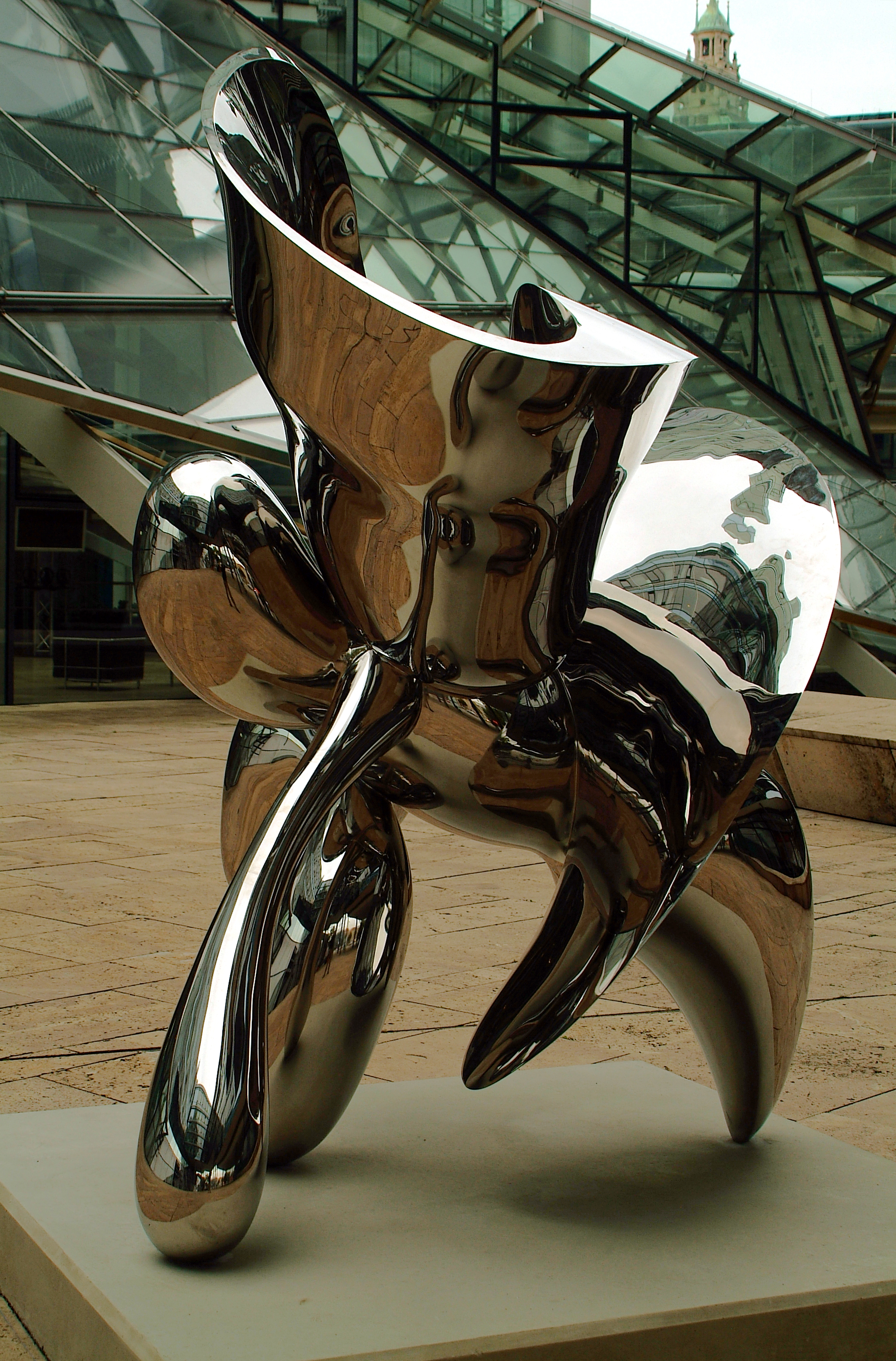
Distant Cousin

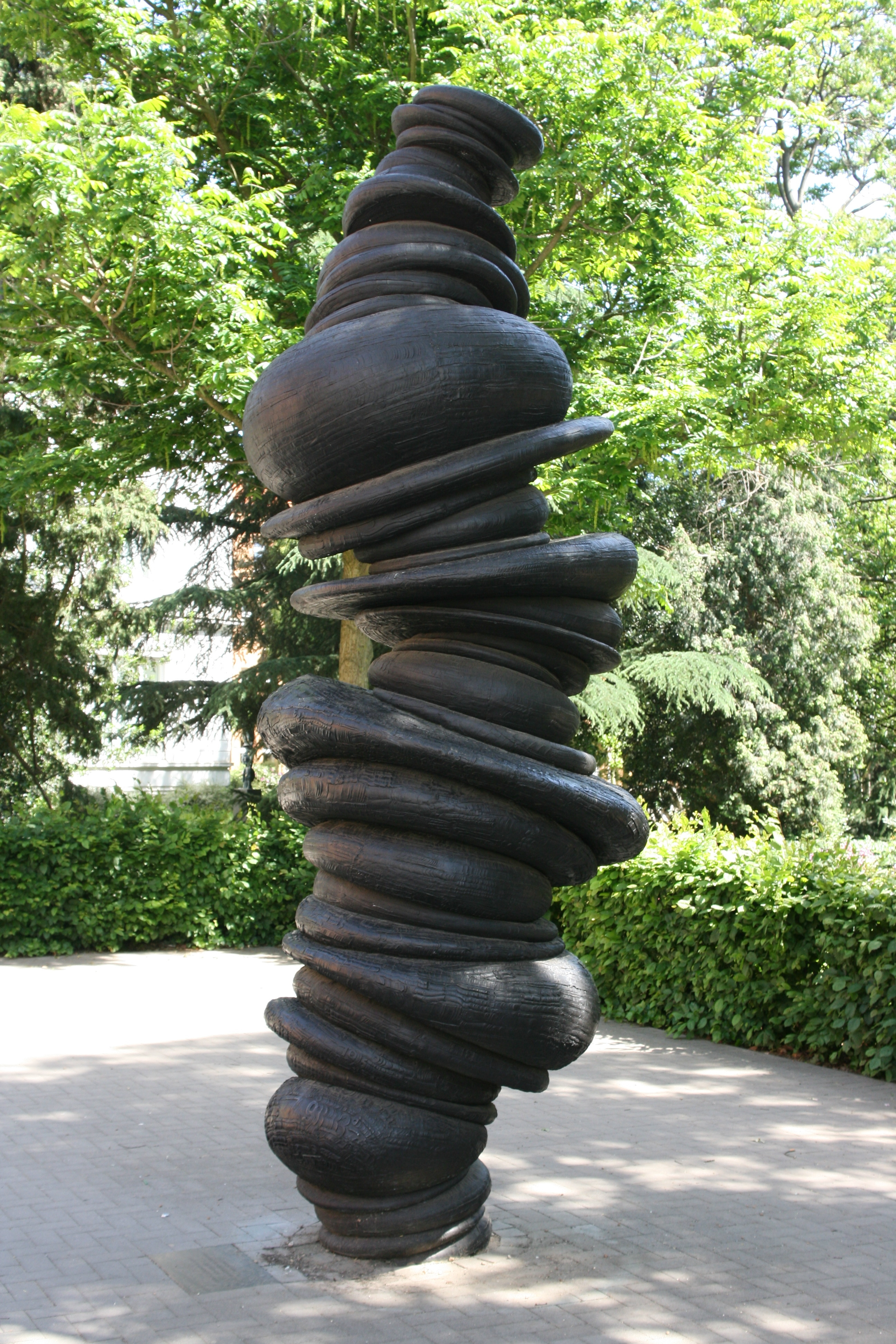
Wirbelsäule – the articulated column, in Viersen

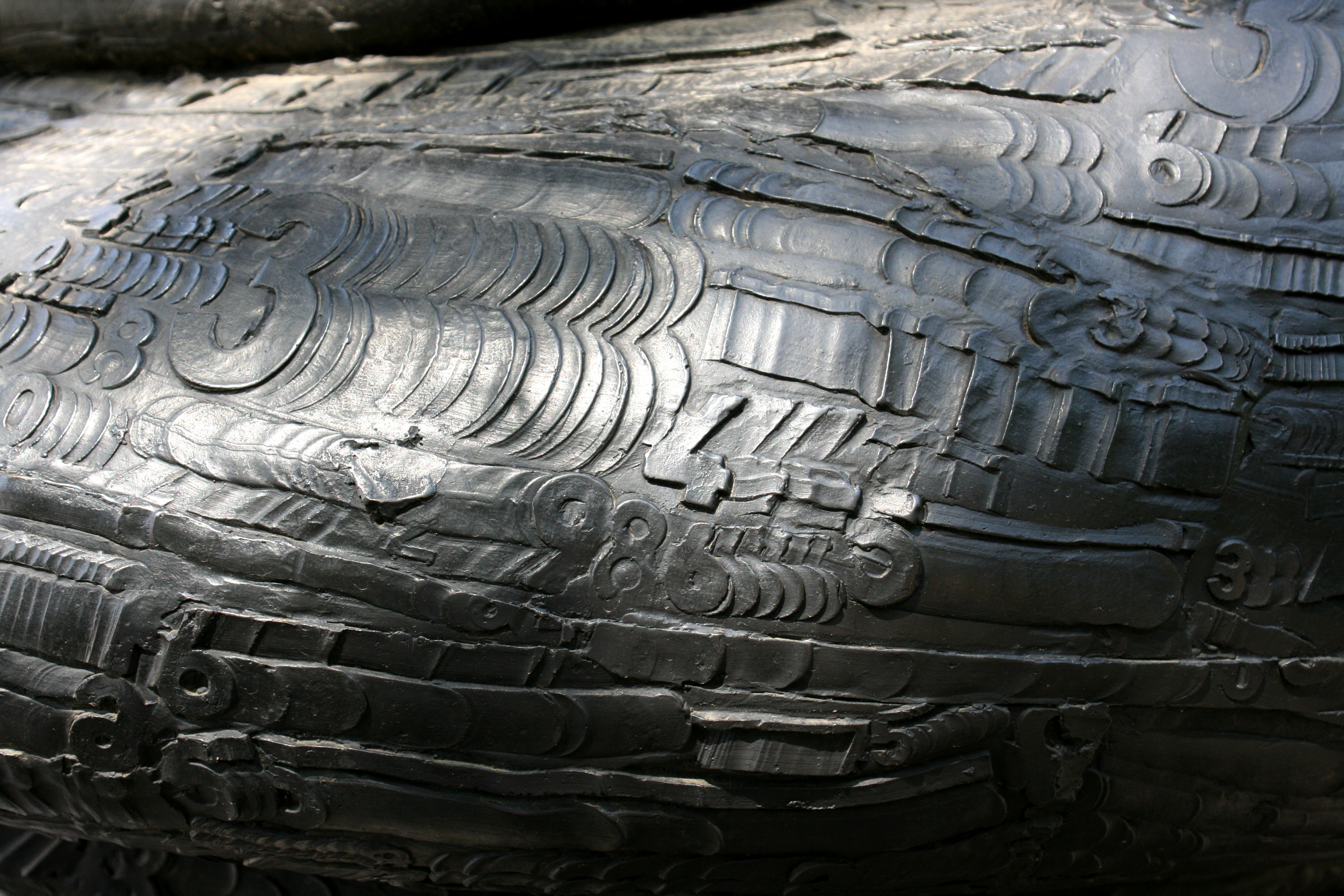
Wirbelsäule, detail

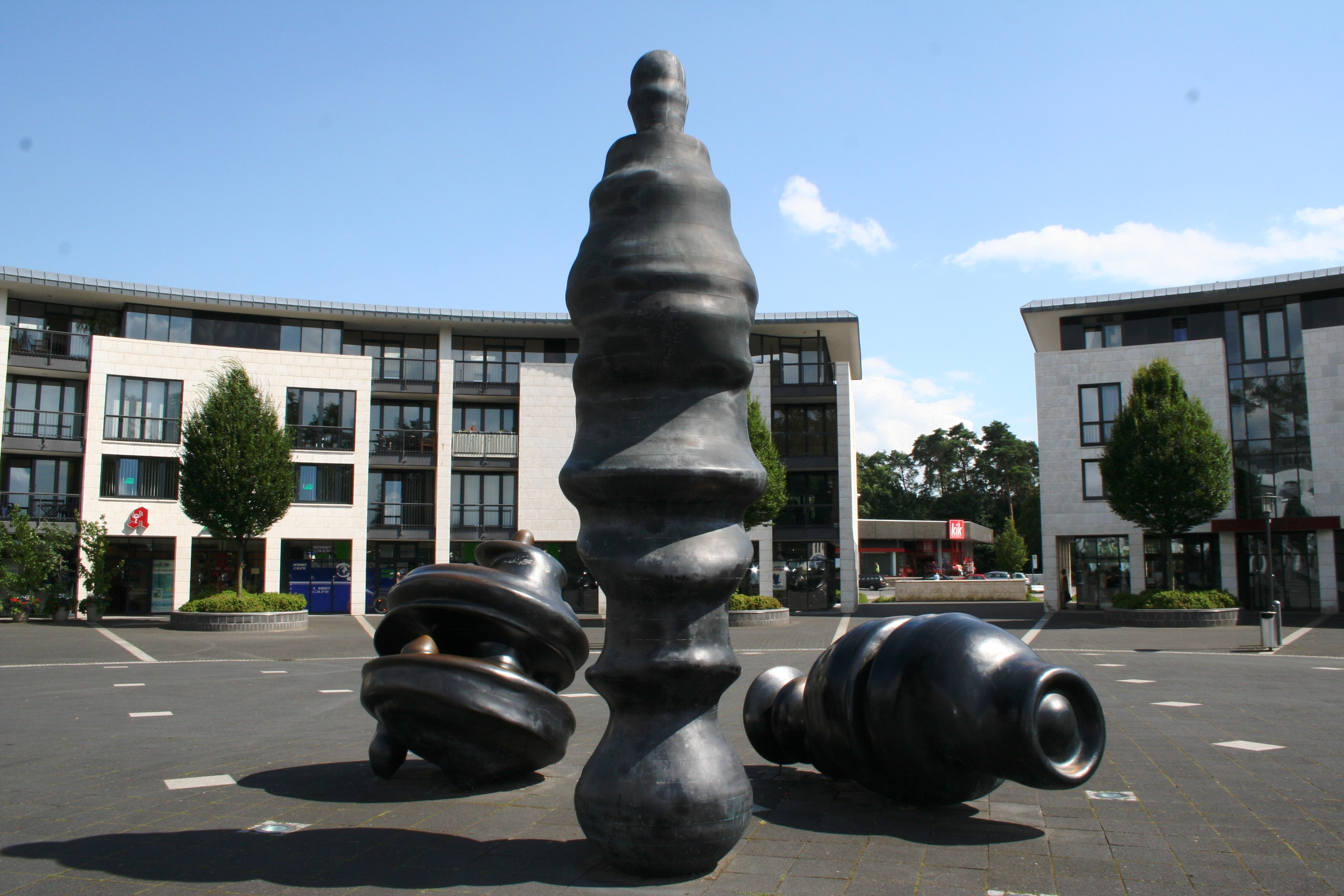
Auf der Lichtung (1997) in Bielefeld

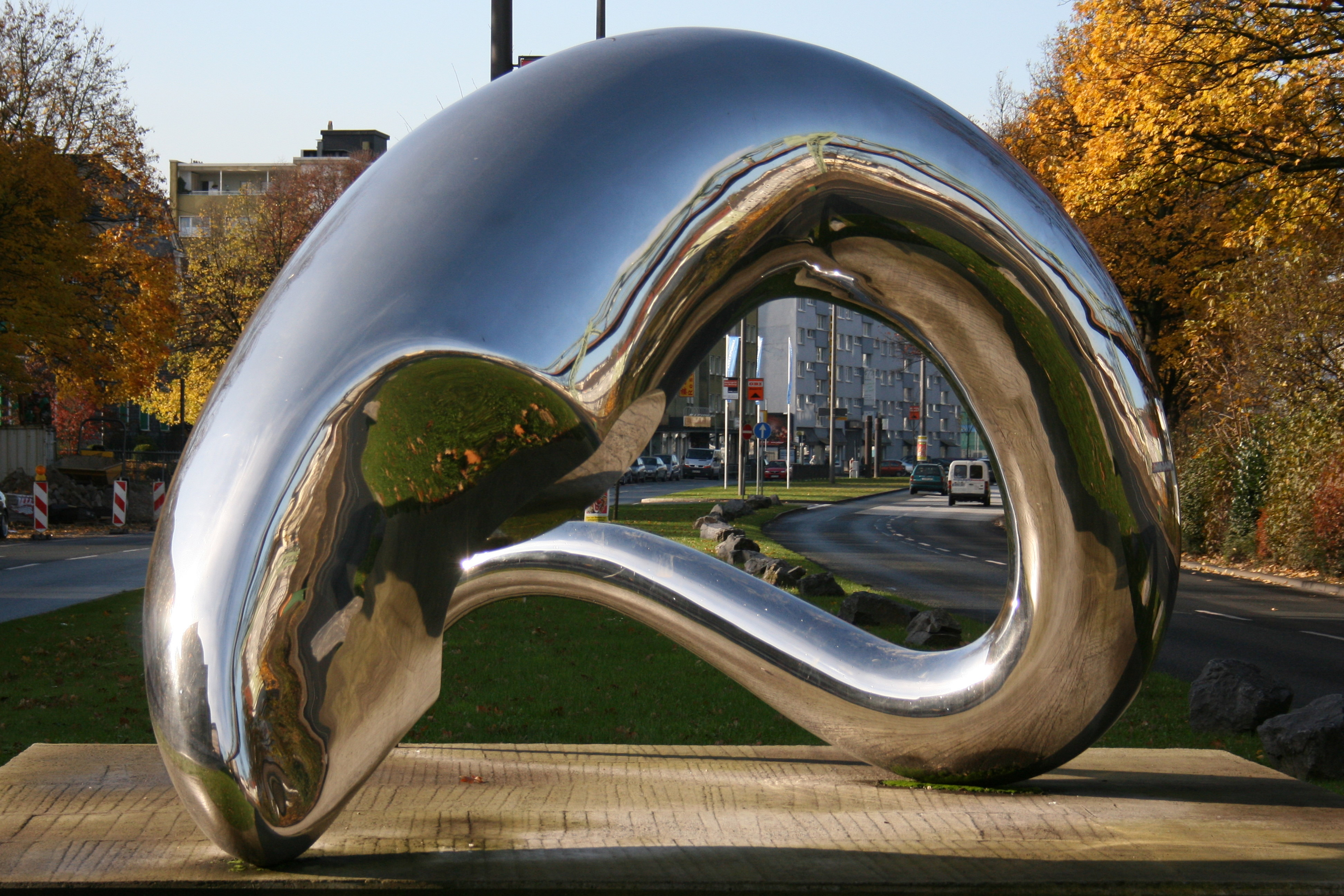
I'm Alive, in Wuppertal

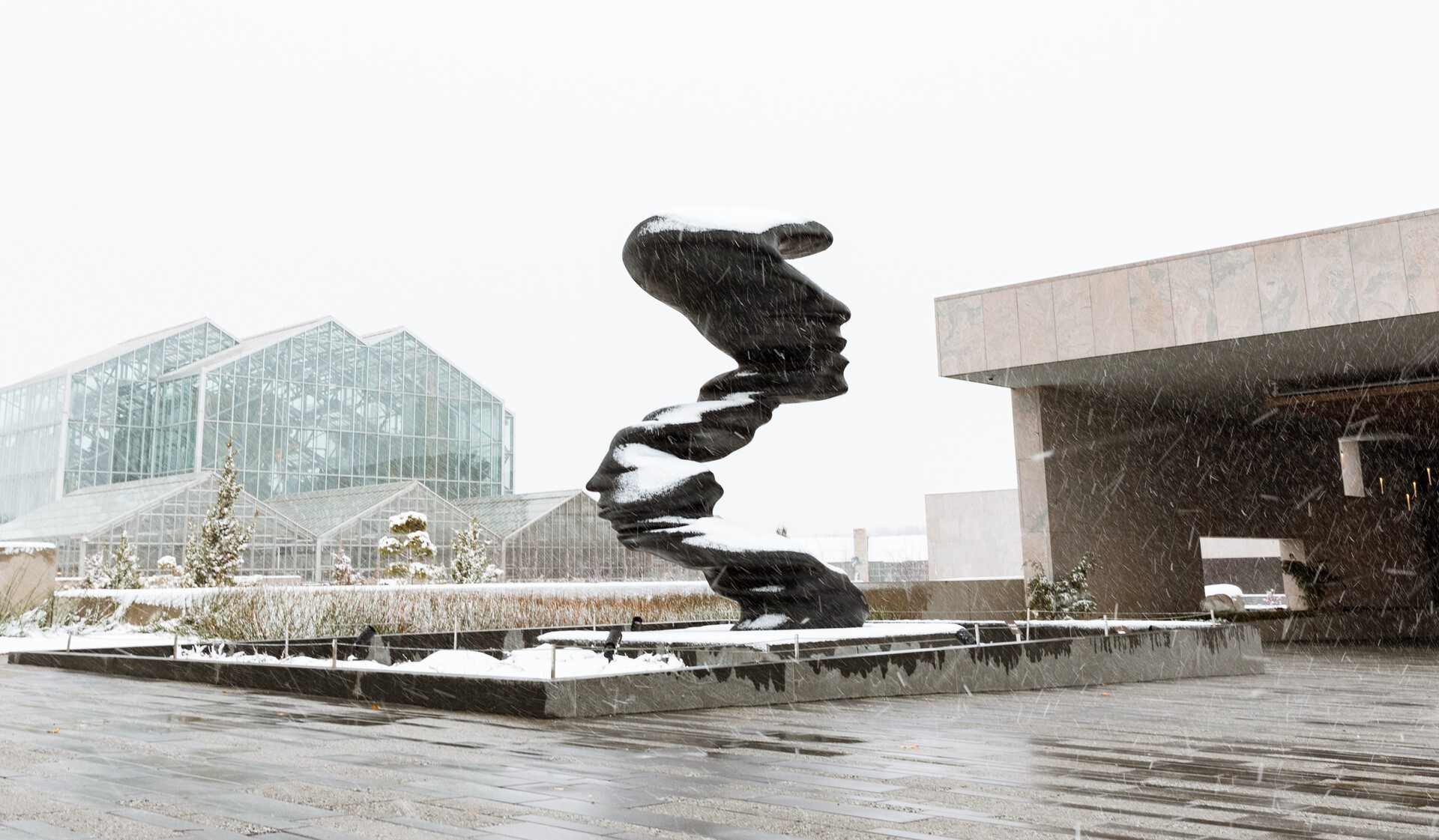
Bent of Mind, Frederik Meijer Gardens & Sculpture Park in Grand Rapids, Michigan

== See also ==
- New Forms (sculpture), Houston, Texas
- Runner (sculpture)
