= Eduardo Ramírez Villamizar =

Colombian sculptor (1923–2004)

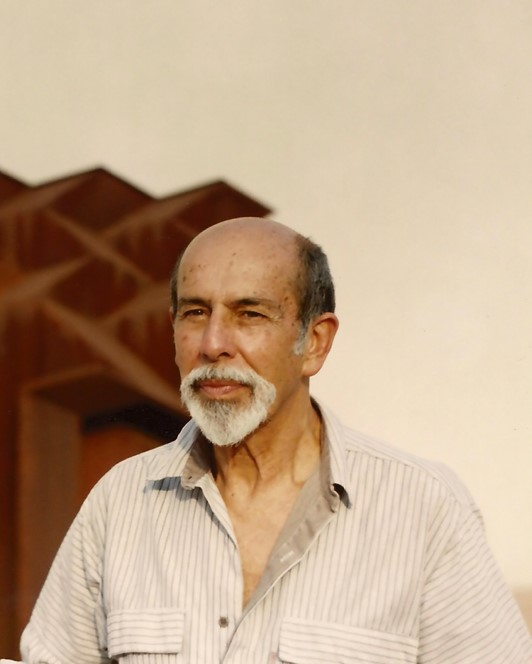
- Born: 27 August 1922; Pamplona, Norte de Santander, Colombia
- Died: 23 August 2004 (aged 81); Bogotá, Colombia
- Education: National University of Colombia
- Occupations: Sculptor, Painter

Eduardo Ramírez Villamizar (27 August 1922 – 24 August 2004) was a Colombian painter and sculptor. He is considered a pioneer of abstract, minimalist, and Constructivist art in Colombia, and in Latin America more broadly.

== Early life and education ==
Ramírez Villamizar was born on 27 August 1922 in Pamplona, Norte de Santander, to parents Adela Villamizar and Jesús Ramírez Castro. He was the youngest of eleven children. His father was a jeweler, and his first experiences making visual art took place in his father's studio.

He and his family moved to Cúcuta in 1929 in seek of work and economic opportunity after being bankrupted in the Great Depression.

In 1940 he moved to Bogotá to study architecture at the National University of Colombia, though he changed his focus to painting in 1944. He was invited by the University of Cauca in 1947 to spend seven months working in Popayán with sculptor Édgar Negret. Negret exposed Ramírez Villamizar to European avant-garde artwork, which he had encountered through colleague and Basque artist Jorge Oteiza.

This formative experience played a crucial role in shaping Ramírez Villamizar's artistic trajectory. He devoted himself to art, beginning with an academic and expressive approach before transitioning to abstraction in the late 1940s and early 1950s.

== Career ==
After a trip to Machu Picchu, Peru, he took inspiration in the Inca culture to do Constructivist art. Although his early mature works maintained aspects of expressionism, by the early 1950s he had fully embraced geometric abstraction, thereby introducing a new constructive language to Colombian modernism.

The 1950s represented a pivotal period, as Ramírez Villamizar's travels and exposure to international modernism refined his visual language. In Paris, his engagement with modern abstraction became central to his artistic practice. He developed a style defined by rigorous geometry, simplified forms, and architectural composition. During this decade, he emerged as a leading figure in Colombian art, exhibiting alongside prominent modernists and achieving national recognition. His receipt of first prize at the Salón Nacional de Artistas de Colombia in 1959, 1962, 1964, and 1966 highlights his prominence within Colombia’s postwar art scene. Critics and scholars identify him as a foundational figure in Colombian geometric abstraction and a significant contributor to Latin American abstraction.

During the 1960s and 1970s, Ramírez Villamizar shifted from painting to relief and subsequently to sculpture, a transformation regarded as pivotal to his mature career. Rather than abandoning painting, he incrementally incorporated volume, employing relief as an intermediary between flat geometric canvases and the metal sculptures for which he is renowned. According to Britannica, he is among the Colombian artists who, in the early 1960s, produced abstract sculptures from colored or intersecting planes, visually associated with Minimalist trends in New York. His residence in New York from the late 1960s through the 1970s proved particularly influential. Works from this era, including Círculos interceptados and Cámaras en progresión, are considered significant milestones in his artistic development. Throughout these decades, he established a sculptural language characterized by austere yet lyrical forms in iron and other materials, frequently alluding to architecture, ritual objects, pre-Hispanic structures, or natural forces without resorting to direct representation.

Throughout his career, Ramírez Villamizar maintained a balance between formal rigor and historical as well as spiritual depth. Museum accounts emphasize the dynamic relationship in his work among nature, ancestral forms, and modern abstraction, rather than interpreting his geometry as solely formalist. This duality forms the foundation of his enduring significance. He was not only a creator of abstract forms but also an artist who imbued geometry with memory, monumentality, and cultural resonance. By the time of his death in Bogotá in 2004, he had achieved recognition as a canonical figure in Colombian art. His legacy persists through retrospectives and centenary exhibitions, including major presentations by the National Museum of Colombia and other institutions that affirm his central role in the history of abstract sculpture in Colombia and Ibero-America.

== Legacy ==
Ramírez Villamizar played a pivotal role in the development of modern abstraction in Colombia, establishing geometric and constructive art as foundational elements within Latin American art. Museums and scholars consistently identify him as a leading figure in postwar abstraction, emphasizing his engagement with international hard-edge and neo-classical trends, as well as his advancement of these concepts within Bogotá and Colombian modernism. His enduring influence is evident as subsequent artists employ geometry to investigate structure, space, history, and cultural memory. For instance, contemporary artist Amadour acknowledges Ramírez Villamizar's impact, highlighting his geometric clarity, architectural tension, and the capacity of abstraction to convey landscape, memory, and historical resonance.

== Later years and death ==
He died in Bogotá on 23 August 2004. He was 81 years old.

== Awards and recognition ==
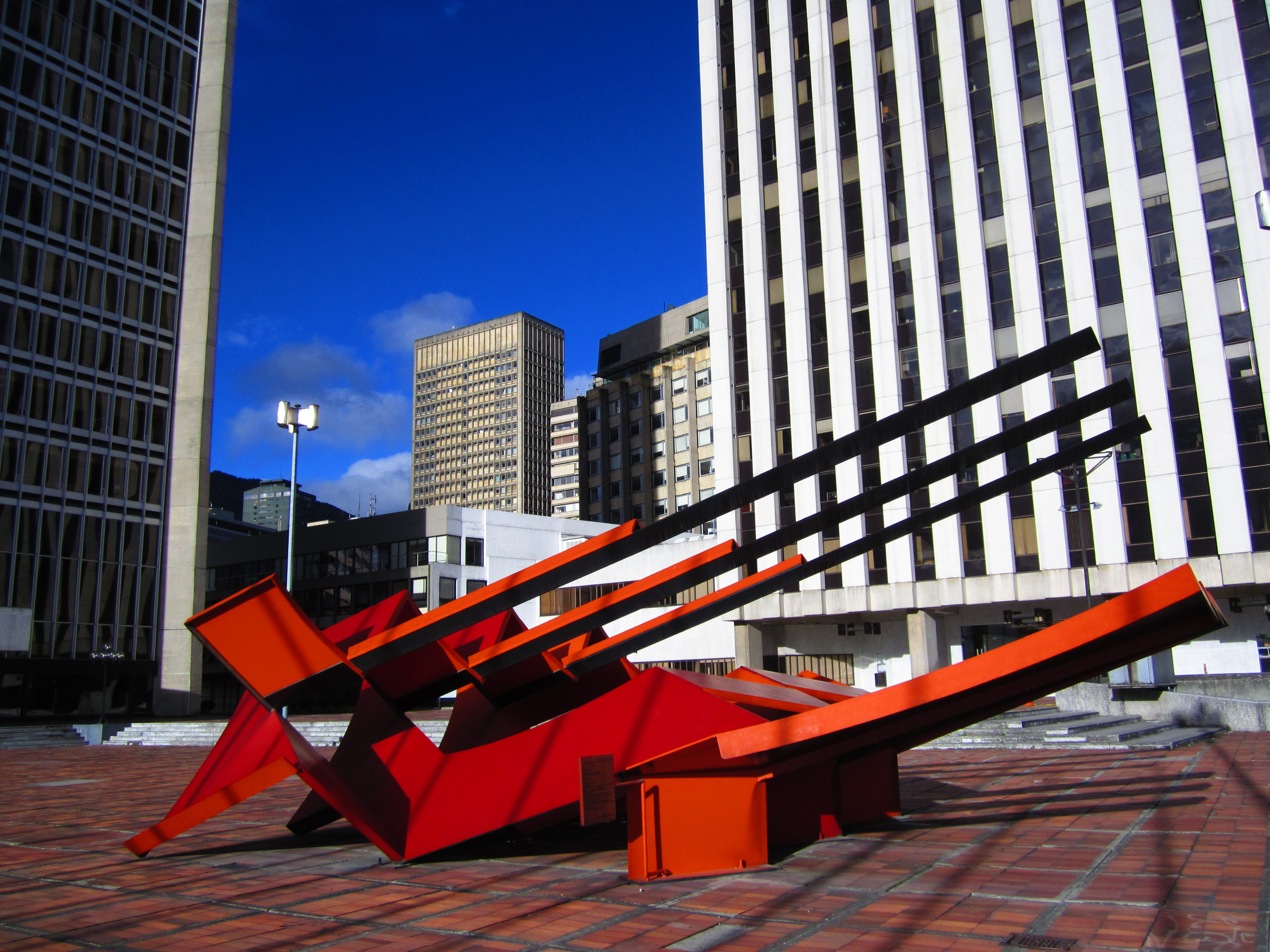
Ramírez's sculpture Nave espacial ("Space Ship") in Bogotá

In 1978, he received the Order of Boyacá, the highest peacetime decoration awarded by the Colombian government. The following year he was also awarded the Medal of ColCultura and the José Eusebio Caro Medal (the latter being awarded by the departmental government of Norte de Santander, Ramírez Villamizar's place of birth).

The Ramírez Villamizar Museum of Modern Art (es), established in 1990 in his hometown of Pamplona, was named in his honor.

The Venezuelan government awarded him with the Order of Francisco de Miranda in 1993.

The National University of Colombia, his alma mater, named him Doctor Honoris Causa in 1993.

A Google Doodle released on 27 August 2019 (the 97th anniversary of his birth) was dedicated to him.
