= 1907 in art =

Events from the year 1907 in art involved some significant events.

== Events ==
- February 7 – Vanessa Stephen marries Clive Bell.
- September 11 – Camden Town Murder: London prostitute Emily Dimmock's throat is cut. On December 19, Robert Wood, an artist charged with the crime and defended by Edward Marshall Hall, is acquitted, to popular acclaim. The next year, Walter Sickert paints a series of four problem pictures, The Camden Town Murder, inspired by the event.
- September – A cast of G. F. Watts' sculpture Physical Energy is erected posthumously in Kensington Gardens in London.
- Henri Matisse begins to teach at the Académie Matisse in Paris, a private and non-commercial art school.
- Adolphe Valette joins the staff of Manchester Municipal School of Art.
- Kunsthalle Mannheim designed by Hermann Billing to serve an International Art Exhibition.
- Bernard Berenson publishes North Italian Painters of the Renaissance.
- Cadmium Red pigment first produced, in Germany.

== Exhibitions ==
- October 1–27 – Salon d'Automne, Paris. Georges Braque exhibits Viaduc à l'Estaque, a proto-Cubist work which later enters the Minneapolis Institute of Arts. Simultaneously, there is a retrospective exhibition of 56 works by Paul Cézanne as a tribute to the artist who died in 1906.

== Works ==
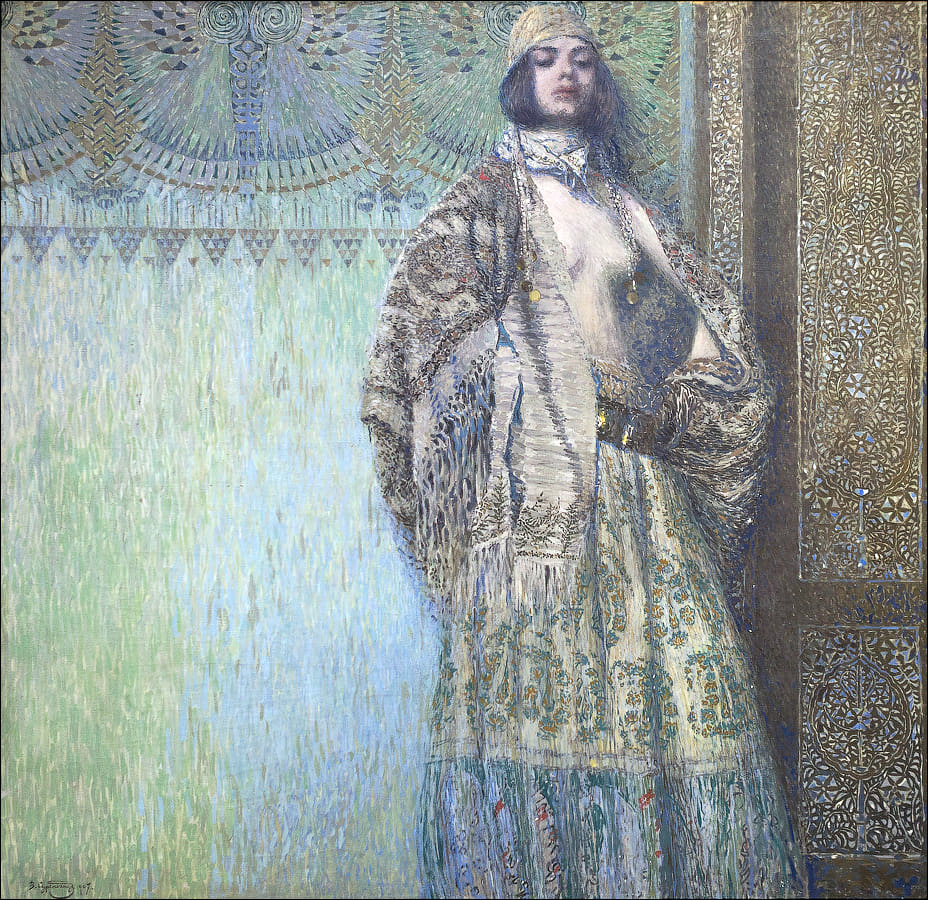
Surenyants – Salomé

- Thomas Anshutz – A Rose
- Vladimir Baranov-Rossine – Self-portrait
- George Bellows – Pennsylvania Station Excavation
- Karl Bitter – Monument to General Sigel
- Solon Borglum – Statue of John Brown Gordon
- Georges Braque – The Viaduct at L'Estaque
- Frank Cadogan Cowper – Vanity
- Robert Delaunay – Still Life with a Parrot
- Gustaf Fjæstad – Winter Evening by a River
- Stanhope Forbes
  - After a Day's Work
  - Gala Day at Newlyn
- J. W. Godward – The Love Letter
- Ivan Grohar – The Sower
- Bernhard Hoetger – Tomb of Paula Modersohn-Becker in Worpswede churchyard
- Adrian Jones – Equestrian statue of the Duke of Cambridge, Whitehall (London)
- Wassily Kandinsky – Das Bunte Leben
- Ernst Ludwig Kirchner – Sitting Woman (Dodo)
- Gustav Klimt
  - Danaë
  - Portrait of Adele Bloch-Bauer I
  - The Sunflower
  - Water Serpents II
- Wilhelm Lehmbruck – Sleep (sculpture)
- Jacek Malczewski – Bacchante
- Henri Matisse
  - Blue Nude (Souvenir de Biskra)
  - Madras Rouge
- Jean Metzinger
  - Colored Landscape with Aquatic Birds
  - Les Ibis
- Piet Mondrian – The Red Cloud
- Claude Monet – many works in the Water Lilies series
- Edvard Munch
  - Death of Marat I and II
  - Jealousy
  - The Sick Child (3rd and 4th painted versions)
- Mikhail Nesterov – Tolstoy on the shore of the pond at Yasnaya Polyana
- Frederic Remington – Fired On
- Pierre-Auguste Renoir – Gabrielle with Open Blouse
- Pablo Picasso – Les Demoiselles d'Avignon
- Francesco Porzio - ''Gamine'' (en The Brat)
- Henri Rousseau
  - The Repast of the Lion
  - The Snake Charmer
- John Singer Sargent
  - Alpine Pool
  - Portrait of Lady Sassoon
  - Lady Speyer
- Walter Sickert – Jack the Ripper's Bedroom
- Paul Signac – The Port of Marseille
- Charles Sims – The Fountain
- Joaquín Sorolla – Maria at La Granja
- Léon Spilliaert – Self-Portrait with a Blue Sketchbook
- Alfred Stieglitz – The Steerage (photograph)
- Vardges Sureniants – Salomé
- Edmund C. Tarbell – Preparing for the Matinee
- Félix Vallotton
  - Portrait of Gertrude Stein
  - Three Women and a Little Girl Playing in the Water
- J. W. Waterhouse – Jason and Medea
- Mahonri Young – Statues of Joseph and Hyrum Smith
- Arnoldo Zocchi – Monument to the Tsar Liberator (Sofia)

== Movements ==
- Cubism begins to take root

== Exhibitions ==
- First Exhibition of Lithuanian Art, Vilnius

== Births ==
=== January to June ===
- January 13 – Jon Gnagy, American painter, illustrator and television art instructor (d. 1981)
- February 4 – James McIntosh Patrick, Scottish landscape painter (d. 1998)
- February 28 – Milton Caniff, American cartoonist (d. 1988)
- March 10 – Toni Frissell, American photographer (d. 1988)
- March 23 – Abidin Dino, Turkish-born painter (d. 1993)
- April 23
  - Lee Miller, American photographer (d. 1977)
  - Fritz Wotruba, Austrian sculptor (d. 1975)
- May 1 – Theodore Roszak, Polish-American sculptor and painter (d. 1981)
- May 10 – Lenore Tawney, American fiber artist (d. 2007)
- May 22 – Hergé, Belgian comics writer and artist (d. 1983)
- June 6
  - Margaret Barker, British artist (d. 2003)
  - George Rickey, American kinetic sculptor (d. 2002)
- June 10 – Fairfield Porter, American painter (d. 1975)
- June 14 – Nicolas Bentley, English author and illustrator (d. 1978)

=== July to December ===
- July 1 – Ilya Bolotowsky, Russian-born American painter (d. 1981)
- July 6 – Frida Kahlo, Mexican painter (d. 1954)
- July 15 – Séamus Murphy, Irish sculptor (d. 1975)
- July 27 – Petar Lubarda, Serbian painter (d. 1974)
- August 5 – Robert George Irwin, American sculptor and spree killer (d. 1975)
- August 7 – Albert Kotin, Russian-born American Abstract Expressionist artist (d. 1980)
- August 17 – Acee Blue Eagle, Native American painter and muralist (d. 1959)
- August 30 – Leonor Fini, Argentinian surrealist painter (d. 1996)
- September 4 – Leo Castelli, Italian-American art dealer and gallerist (d. 1999)
- September 26 – Anthony Blunt, English art historian (d. 1983)
- September 27 – Zhang Chongren, Chinese artist and sculptor (d. 1998)
- October 5 – Jean Louis, French costume designer (d. 1997)
- October 8 – Art Babbitt, American animator (d. 1992)
- October 21 – Nikos Engonopoulos, Greek painter and poet (d. 1985)
- November 1 – Terence Cuneo, English railway and military painter (d. 1996)
- November 4 – Henry Heerup, Danish painter and sculptor (d. 1993)
- November 14 – William Steig, American cartoonist, sculptor and author (d. 2003)
- November 19 – Hans Liska, Austrian-born German artist (d. 1983)
- November 22 – Dora Maar, French photographer, poet and painter, lover of Pablo Picasso (d. 1997)
- November 28 – Charles Alston, American artist, muralist and teacher (d. 1977).

=== Full date unknown ===
- Marie Z. Chino, potter and ceramic artist (d. 1982)
- Art Frahm, American pin-up and advertising artist (d. 1981)

== Deaths ==
- January 8 – Theodoor Verstraete, Belgian rural realist painter and printmaker (born 1850)
- February 11 – Christen Dalsgaard, Danish painter (born 1824)
- February 14 – Adolf Seel, German painter (born 1829)
- March 26 – Ettore Roesler Franz, Italian painter (born 1845)
- April 14 – James Clarke Hook, marine and historical painter (born 1819)
- May 5 – Şeker Ahmet Paşa, Turkish military painter (born 1841)
- May 11 – Edward Kemeys, American sculptor (born 1843)
- May 18 – Bernhard Plockhorst, German painter and graphic artist (born 1825)
- June 14 – Giuseppe Pellizza da Volpedo, Italian neo-impressionist painter (born 1868)
- June 16 – Robert Taylor Pritchett, British gun manufacturer, artist and illustrator. Pritchett illustrated Darwin's The Voyage of the Beagle (born in 1828)
- July 16 – Théobald Chartran, French propaganda painter (born 1849)
- August 3 – Augustus Saint-Gaudens, American Beaux-Arts sculptor (born 1848)
- October 4 – Alfredo Keil, Portuguese romantic composer and painter (born 1850)
- October 30 – Đorđe Krstić, Serbian Realist painter (born 1851)
- November 10 – Alexander Zick, German painter and illustrator (born 1845)
- November 20 – Paula Modersohn-Becker, German Expressionist painter (born 1876; embolism)
- November 21 Balduin Wolff, German painter and chess player (born 1819)
- November 23 – John F. Peto, American trompe-l'œil painter (born 1854)
- November 26 – Mario Raggi, Italian sculptor (born 1821)
- November 27 – Paul Ritter, German architectural painter (born 1829)
- November 28 – Stanisław Wyspiański, Polish dramatist, painter and designer (born 1869)
