= 1981 in art =

Events from the year 1981 in art.

== Events ==
- 10 September – Picasso's painting Guernica is returned from New York to Madrid.
- unknown date – Blek le Rat begins his stencil graffiti art in Paris.

== Awards ==
- Archibald Prize: Eric Smith – Rudy Komon

== Exhibitions ==
- 9 June – Black Art an'done opens at Wolverhampton Art Gallery in the UK.

== Works ==
- Tony Cragg – Britain as Seen from the North
- John Doubleday – Statue of Charlie Chaplin (Leicester Square, London)
- Don Eckland – Emergence (bronze, Eugene, Oregon)
- Bryan Hunt – Arch Falls (bronze, Houston, Texas)
- Nabil Kanso – Dreamvision series of paintings completed
- Ellsworth Kelly – Curve XXIV (sculpture, Seattle)
- Carlo Maria Mariani – The Constellation of Leo
- Ana Mendieta Maroya (Esculturas Rupestres) (executed in caves in Cuba)
- Odd Nerdrum – Twilight
- Helmut Newton – Sie kommen! ("They're coming!", photographic diptych; published in French Vogue, November)
- Richard Serra – Tilted Arc, Federal Plaza, New York City (dismantled 1989)
- Andy Warhol – Myths series
- Aubrey Williams – Shostakovich series of paintings completed

== Births ==
- 15 April – Seth Wulsin, American artist
- 19 April – Saskia de Brauw, Dutch model and artist
- 4 November – Paul Tucker, Canadian visual artist and graphic novel and webcomic illustrator
- 20 November – Scott Hutchison, Scottish singer, songwriter, guitarist, and visual artist (d. 2018)

== Deaths ==
- 19 January – Francesca Woodman, 22, American photographer
- 4 April – Isaac Frenkel Frenel, Israeli French painter and sculptor (b. 1899)
- 8 May – Grethe Jürgens, German painter (b. 1899)
- 25 May – Armando de Armas Romero, Cuban painter (b. 1914)
- 28 May – Jean Paul Slusser, painter, designer, art critic, professor, and director of the University of Michigan Museum of Art (b. 1886)
- 16 June – Hans Coper, German-born English studio potter (b. 1920)
- 19 June – Lotte Reiniger, German silhouette animator and film director (b.1899)
- 29 June – Russell Drysdale, Australian artist (b. 1912)
- 8 July – Isaac Soyer, Russian-born American painter, (b. 1902)
- 16 July – John E. Berninger, American landscape painter (b. 1896)
- 7 September – Christy Brown, Irish author, painter and poet (b. 1932)
- 12 October – Enzo Plazzotta, Italian-born British sculptor (b. 1921)
- 13 October – Antonio Berni, Argentine painter (b. 1905)
- 20 October – Annot, German painter (b. 1894).
- 23 October – Reg Butler, English sculptor (b. 1913)
- 17 November – Nano Reid, Irish painter (b. 1905)
- 22 November – Corrado Parducci, Italian-American architectural sculptor (b. 1900)
- 5 December - Max Spivak - 74, American muralist (b. 1901)
- 28 December – Bram van Velde, Dutch painter (b. 1895)

=== Full date unknown ===
- Hubert Davis, American artist (b.1902).
- Art Frahm, American pin-up and advertising artist (b.1907).
- Pinchus Kremegne, Belarusian sculptor, painter and lithographer (b.1890).

== See also ==
- 1981 in fine arts of the Soviet Union
