= Kako =

Kako or KAKO may refer to:

== Acronyms ==
- KAKO (FM), a radio station licensed to Ada, Oklahoma, United States
- Colorado Plains Regional Airport (ICAO code), Colorado Plains, Colorado, United States

== Arts and entertainment ==
- "Kako", a song by Kazunari Ninomiya of Arashi from the album 2004 Arashi! Iza, Now Tour!!
- Kako, a main character in Noggin's Oobi television show
- Kako Band, an Iranian band

== Military ==
- Japanese cruiser Kako, a 1925 heavy cruiser sunk in World War II
- Kako, a discontinued Japanese Sendai-class cruiser (1922)

== People ==
- Satoshi Kako (かこさとし; 1926 – 2018), Japanese author and illustrator
- Takashi Kako (加古 隆; born 1947), Japanese pianist and composer
- Kako (musician) (1936–1994), Puerto Rican percussionist and bandleader
- Princess Kako of Akishino (born 1994), member of the Imperial House of Japan
- Kakō Moriguchi (森口 華弘; 1909 – 2008), Japanese textile artist
- Kako Sanz (born 1993), Spanish footballer
- Kako Tomotaki (友滝 佳子; born 1995), Japanese former figure skater
- Tsuji Kakō (都路華香; 1870 – 1931), Japanese painter
- Kako Kawaguchi (河口 華子; born 1995), Japanese water polo player

== Places ==
- Kako District, Hyōgo, Japan
- Kako, Bihar, a town in India
- Kako River, Guyana
- Kako River, Japan

== Other uses ==
- Kako language, a Bantu language spoken mainly in Cameroon
- Kako Senior Secondary School, Masaka, Uganda
- The acrophonic name of the letter Ka (Cyrillic) in the old Russian alphabet
