= Emergence (sculpture) =

1981 bronze sculpture by Don Eckland in Eugene, Oregon, U.S.

- The sculpture in 2015
- Artist: Don Eckland
- Year: 1981
- Type: Sculpture
- Medium: Bronze
- Dimensions: 1.7 m (68 in)
- Location: Eugene, Oregon, United States; 44.04210°N 123.07863°W

Emergence is an outdoor 1981 bronze sculpture by Don Eckland, installed in the Education Courtyard, on the University of Oregon campus in Eugene, Oregon, in the United States. The work is one of two by Eckland on the campus; New Horizons (1981) is also installed in the Education Courtyard.

== Description ==
Emergence is a cast bronze sculpture depicting a woman with long hair flowing down to her right upper thigh. Her hair is parted and covers both of her eyes. The statue is 68 inches (1.7 m) tall and weighs approximately 130 pounds. Eckland has described the work as a "young woman... poised at rest just prior to departing... [S]he is indeed ready to emerge."

== See also ==
- 1981 in art
