= Fired On =

1907 painting by Frederic Remington

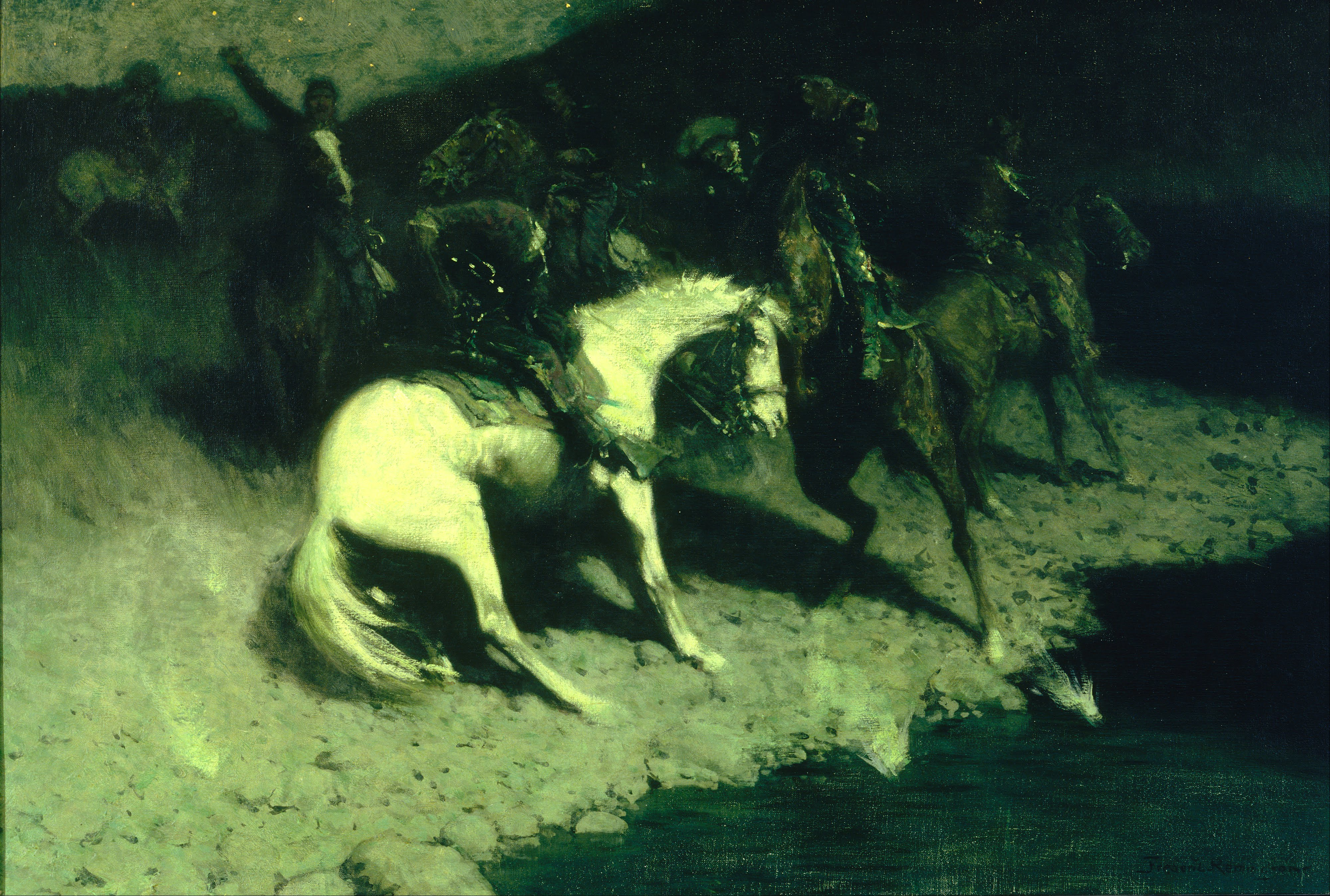
Frederic Remington, Fired On, 1907, Smithsonian American Art Museum

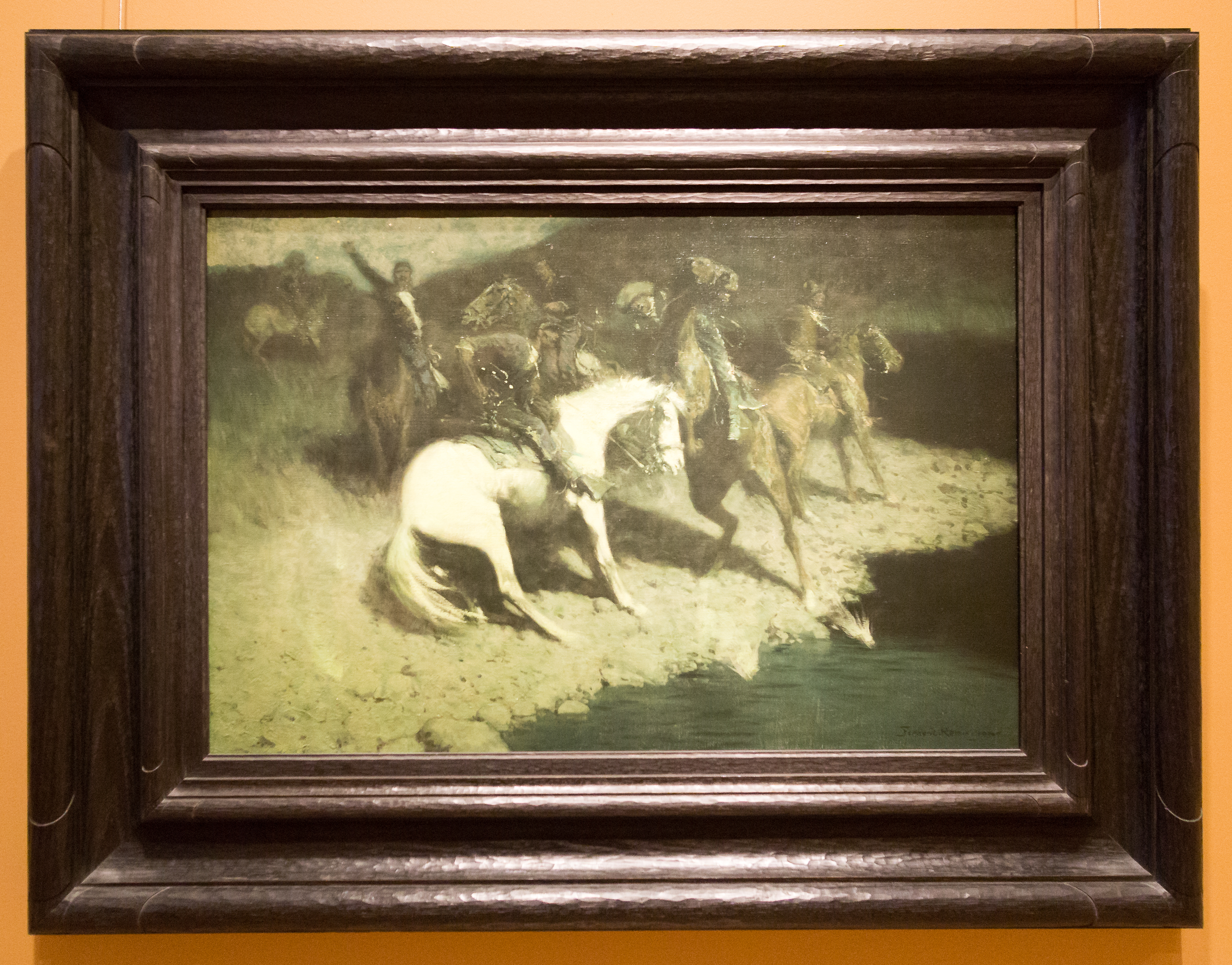
In its simple wooden frame

Fired On is a 1907 oil painting by Frederic Remington. It measures 68.8 cm × 101.6 cm (27.1 in × 40.0 in) and has been held by the Smithsonian American Art Museum since 1910.

Sometimes described as a nocturne, it depicts a group of men on horseback lit by moonlight in the murky pre-dawn. An unseen adversary has fired upon the man on a white horse.

The painting was bought by William T. Evans in November 1909, and he donated it to the Smithsonian Gallery of Art, now the Smithsonian American Art Museum. It was the first painting by Remington to be acquired by a US public gallery. The painting was displayed in the Oval Office during the presidency of Harry S. Truman. Later presidents preferred bronzes by Remington, such as The Bronco Buster or The Rattlesnake.

Remington's paintings of the Wild West were later copied by Western filmmakers, with John Ford saying that his 1948 movie She Wore a Yellow Ribbon: "I tried to copy the Remington style there. You can't copy him one hundred per cent, but you can get the colour and the movement."

== See also ==
- Art in the White House
