= Margaret Fox (disambiguation) =

Margaret Fox (1833–1893) and her sisters were noted 19th-century spiritualists.

Margaret Fox may also refer to:

- Margaret Fell (1614–1702), or Fox, Quaker leader
- Margaret R. Fox (1916–2006), American computer scientist
- Margaret Taylor Fox (1857–c. 1941), American artist
- Margaret Ellen Fox, American girl who disappeared in 1974
- Margaret Fox (sprinter), winner of the 1997 4 × 400 meter relay at the NCAA Division I Indoor Track and Field Championships
- Margaret Fox (discus thrower), 9th at the 1979 AIAW Outdoor Track and Field Championships
