= The Way They Live =

Painting by Thomas Anshutz

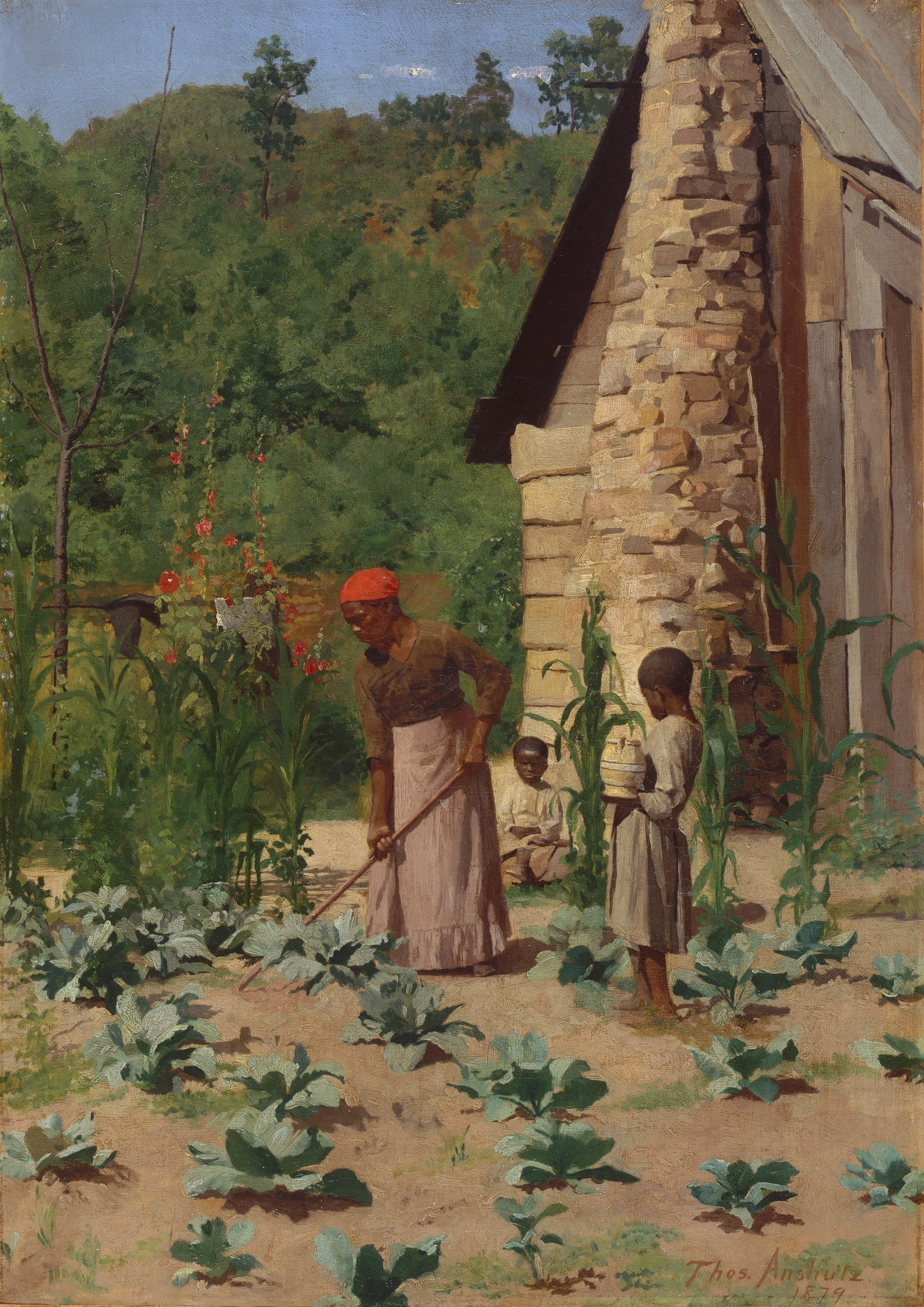
- Artist: Thomas Anshutz
- Year: 1879
- Medium: Oil on wood panel
- Dimensions: 61 cm × 43.2 cm (24 in × 17.0 in)
- Location: Metropolitan Museum of Art; New York City

The Way They Live is a late 19th-century painting by American artist Thomas Anshutz. Done in oil on canvas, the painting is in the collection of the Metropolitan Museum of Art.
