= New Horizons (Eckland) =

- The sculpture in 2015
- Artist: Don Eckland
- Year: 1981
- Medium: Bronze sculpture
- Location: Eugene, Oregon, United States; 44.042°N 123.0799°W

New Horizons is a 1981 bronze sculpture by Don Eckland, installed in the University of Oregon's Education Courtyard, in Eugene, Oregon, United States. The artwork depicts a "loosely rendered, matronly figure surrounded by at least four loosely rendered children".

Eckland said of work: "It is my intention with this sculpture to present a multi-faceted work suggesting numerous relationships. There are those between the larger figure, which at once suggests in itself the past and the contemporary, and the several smaller figures with their interdependence. And there is the desire to seek out and explore with unsuredness in the smaller figures which clearly gain confidence and security from each other and the adult figure. In essence, I have attempted to suggest a relationship of education and guidance in seeking new horizons."

== See also ==
- 1981 in art
