= The Rattlesnake (Remington) =

Sculpture by Frederic Remington

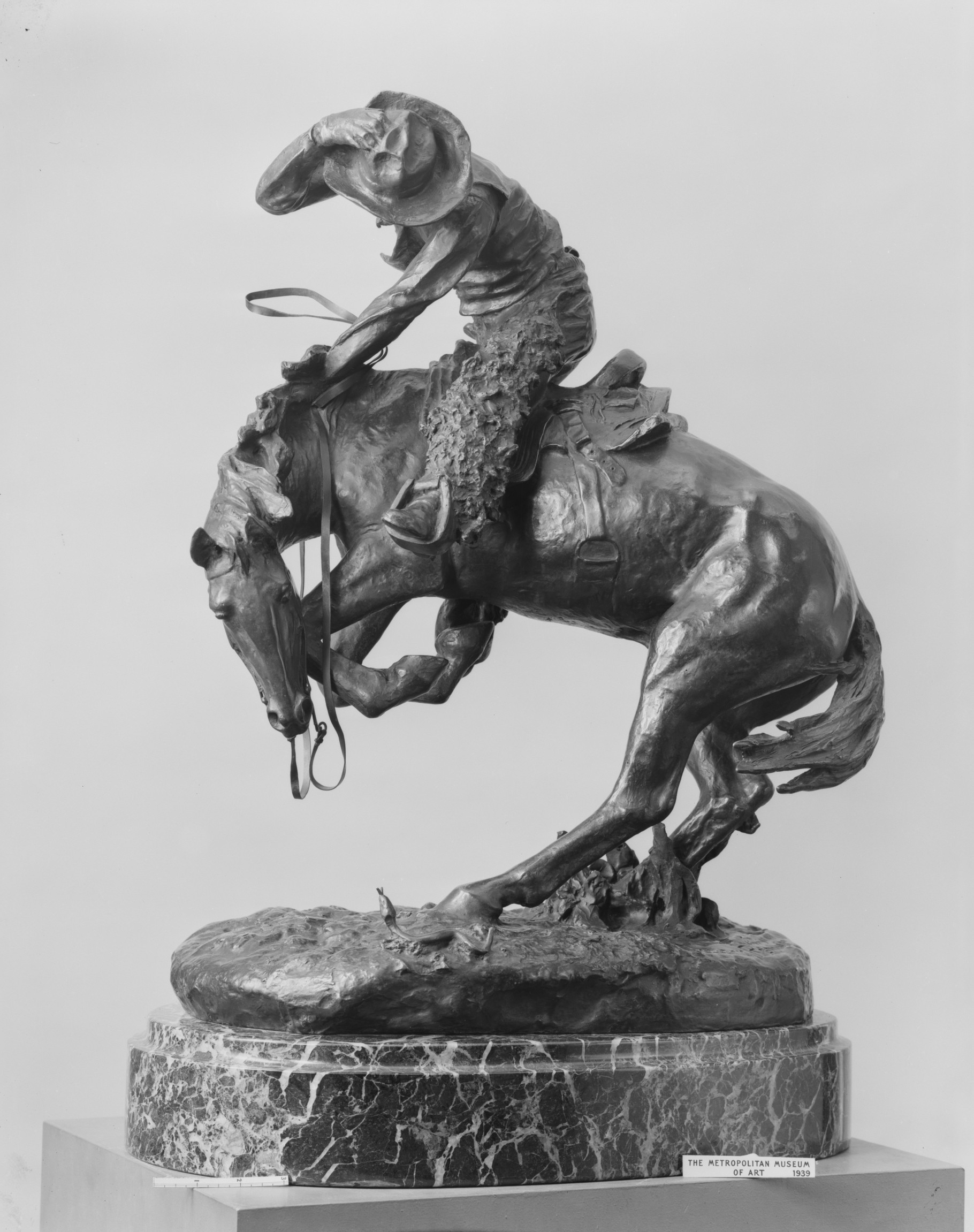
The Rattlesnake, Metropolitan Museum of Art

The Rattlesnake is an equestrian sculpture by American artist Frederic Remington. The bronze sculpture was one of Remington's most popular, after The Broncho Buster, and it has been described as Remington's own favorite sculpture.

The work depicts a cowboy riding a horse that is rearing up in fright, twisting away from a rattlesnake on the base. The rider, with moustache and woolly chaps, leans forward, gripping the horse's mane with one hand and holding on to his hat with the other.

Remington completed a plaster model in January 1905, which was cast in bronze by the Roman Bronze Works using the lost wax process. Eleven bronzes had been cast from this first model, 20.5 inches (520 mm) high, by 1908, when Remington became dissatisfied with the original design.

Over a period of ten days, Remington reworked the plaster model. The revisions increased the tension of its pose by changing the position of the horse's legs, tucking in its forelegs and straightening the rear legs, and also increased the fluid curvature of the piece by moving the rider's stance further forward. The changes added about 4 inches (100 mm) to its height. Around 100 authorised casts were made of the new version before 1921, but many unauthorised posthumous casts were made later by the Roman Bronze Works. An example is held by the Metropolitan Museum of Art which measures 58.7 by 45.1 by 36.8 centimetres (23.1 in × 17.8 in × 14.5 in), bequeathed by Jacob Ruppert in 1939. An example was sold by Christie's in 2009 for US$134,500, and another in 2011 for US$92,500

A cast was displayed in the Oval Office by US Presidents Ronald Reagan and George H. W. Bush, along with another Remington bronze The Bronco Buster. An enlarged version made in 1999 is displayed at Jonesboro, Arkansas.

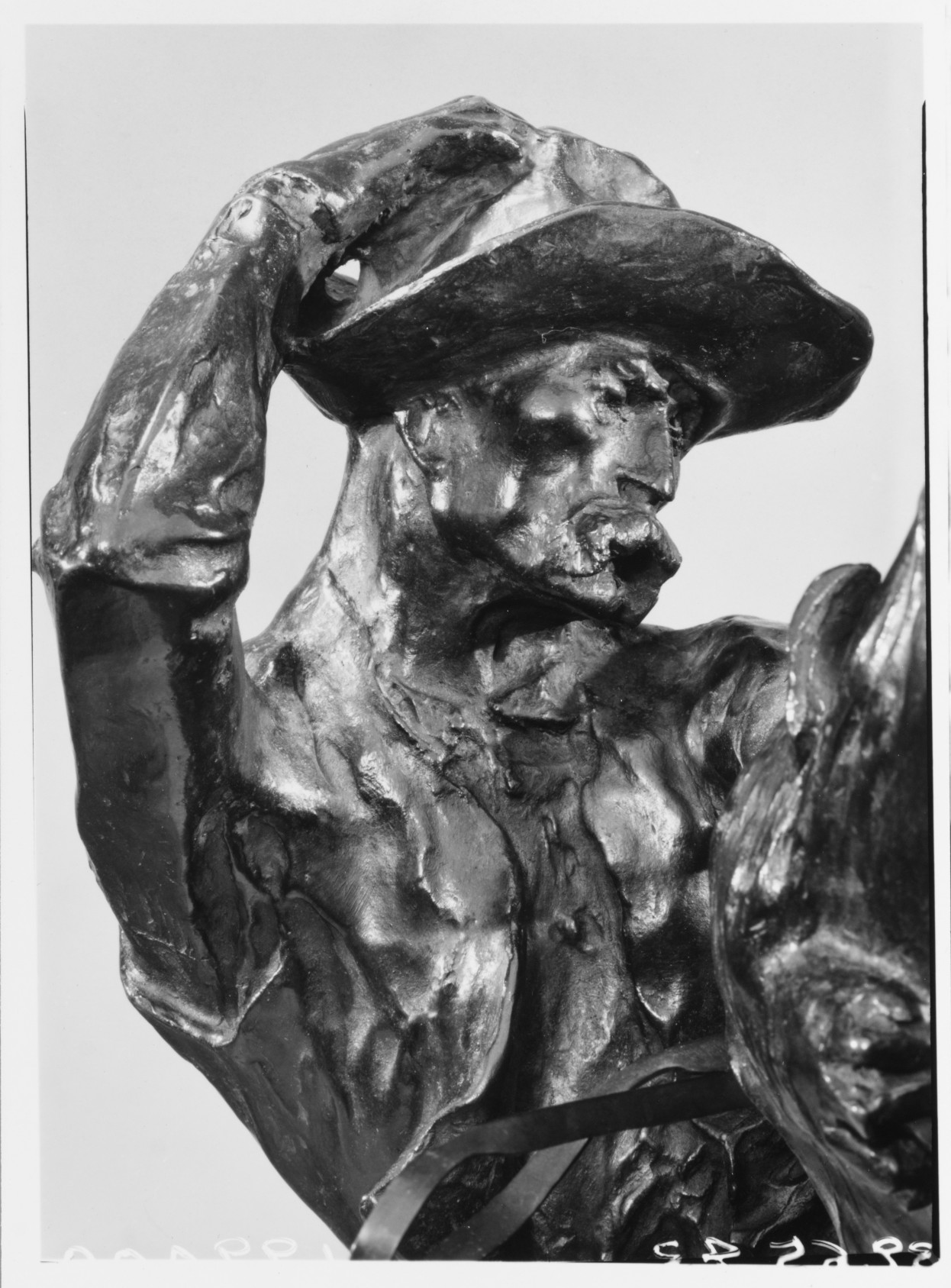
Detail of the cast at the Metropolitan Museum of Art

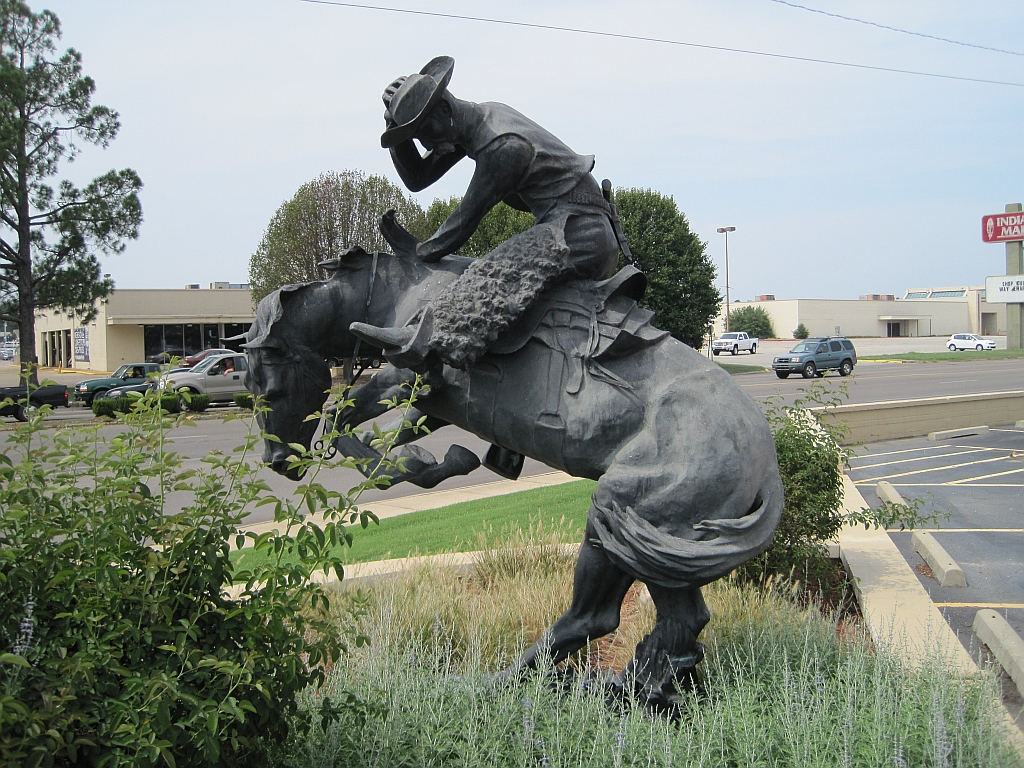
Large cast displayed at Jonesboro, Arkansas

== See also ==
- Art in the White House
