= The Ironworkers' Noontime =

1880 painting by Thomas Anshutz

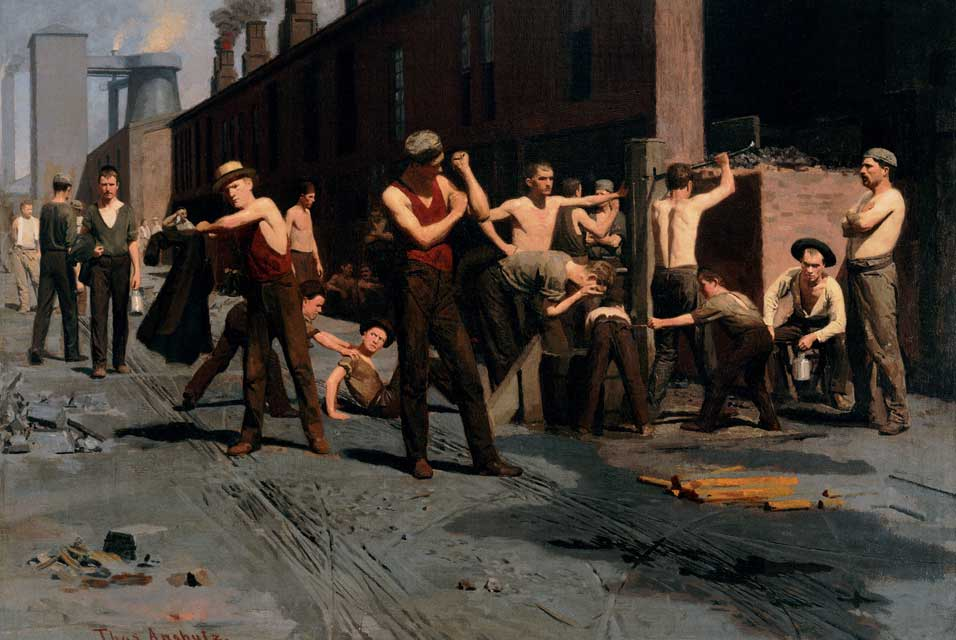
- Artist: Thomas Anshutz
- Year: 1880
- Medium: Oil on canvas
- Dimensions: 43.2 cm × 60.6 cm (17.0 in × 23.9 in)
- Location: Fine Arts Museums of San Francisco

The Ironworker's Noontime is an 1880 painting by the American painter Thomas Anshutz.

The painting depicts several workers on their break in the yard of a foundry and is one of the most popular of Anshutz' paintings. Painted near Wheeling, West Virginia, it is conceived in a naturalistic style featuring realistic anatomical depictions of men and boys similar to that of Thomas Eakins, although Eakins never painted industrial subjects. Also like Eakins, Anshutz composed this painting with the help of photographs and studies. Some of the figures are depicted in a classical pose, such as the man in the foreground rubbing his arm. This figure's pose imitates that of one from the Parthenon. The piece was exhibited at the Philadelphia Sketch Club in 1881 and compared to Eakins' work by art critics. Art historian Randall C. Griffin has written of it: "One of the first American paintings to depict the bleakness of factory life, The Ironworkers' Noontime appears to be a clear indictment of industrialization. Its brutal candor startled critics, who saw it as unexpectedly confrontational—a chilling industrial snapshot not the least picturesque or sublime." It is now in the collection of the Fine Arts Museums of San Francisco.

== Bibliography ==
- Griffin, Randall C. (2004). Homer, Eakins, & Anshutz: The Search for American Identity in the Gilded Age. University Park: Pennsylvania State University Press. ISBN 0-271-02329-5
