= Oele =

Oele Eul
- Village
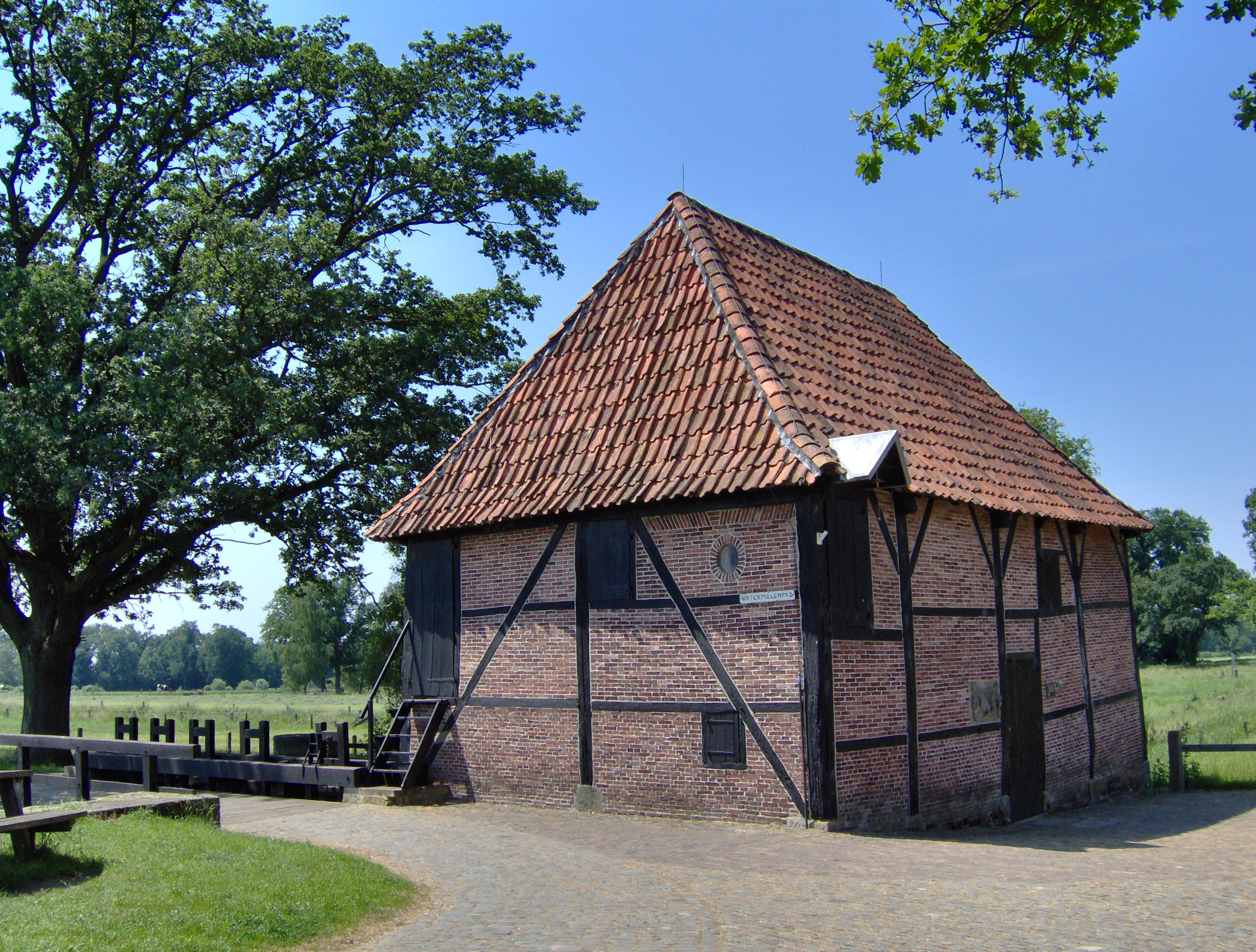
- The Watermill De Oldemeule in Oele

- Location in the province of Overijssel in the Netherlands Oele (Netherlands)
- Coordinates: 52°14′37″N 6°45′8″E
- Country: Netherlands
- Province: Overijssel
- Municipality: Hengelo

Area
  - Total: 9.24 km^{2} (3.57 sq mi)
- Elevation: 21 m (69 ft)

Population (2021)
  - Total: 265
  - Density: 28.7/km^{2} (74.3/sq mi)
- Time zone: UTC+1 (CET)
  - Summer (DST): UTC+2 (CEST)
- Postal code: 7554
- Dialing code: 074

Oele (in old Dutch also: Eule, Dutch Low Saxon: Eul) is a village in the municipality Hengelo in the Dutch province of Overijssel. It is located south-west of Hengelo, south of the Twentekanaal. The highway A35 and the Provincial road 739|N739 (the road from Hengelo to Beckum and Haaksbergen) are close to the population centre. Until the establishment of the municipality of Hengelo, Oele was part of the richterambt Delden.

== Water Mill De Oldemeule ==
Since the 14th century, Oele has a water mill. The current water mill, De Oldemeule, dates back to 1690. The water mill was owned by Joost Christoffer van Beverforde tot Oldemeule, drost of Twente and owner of the havezate (a type of fortified house) Oldemeule, which was demolished in 1800. The estate that belonged to the havezate was handed over to Twickel in 1840; the mill was added to this property in 1880. In the past there was also an oil mill, but it was demolished in 1900. During the Second World War the remaining mill was still in use to process grain, but after the war its use declined. Now the mill is owned by the municipality of Hengelo, which reinstated the mill in 1979. It is open to the public on Sundays during the summer months. During the last couple of years, new millers have been trained to operate the mill.

== Piet Mondriaan ==
Piet Mondriaan stayed in Oele a number of times, in 1907-1908, with his friend and painter Albert G. Hulshoff Pol (1883-1957). During this period he made some of his famous early works, "De rode wolk" (The Red Cloud, 1907), and "Het bos bij Oele" (Woods near Oele, 1908).

== Gallery ==
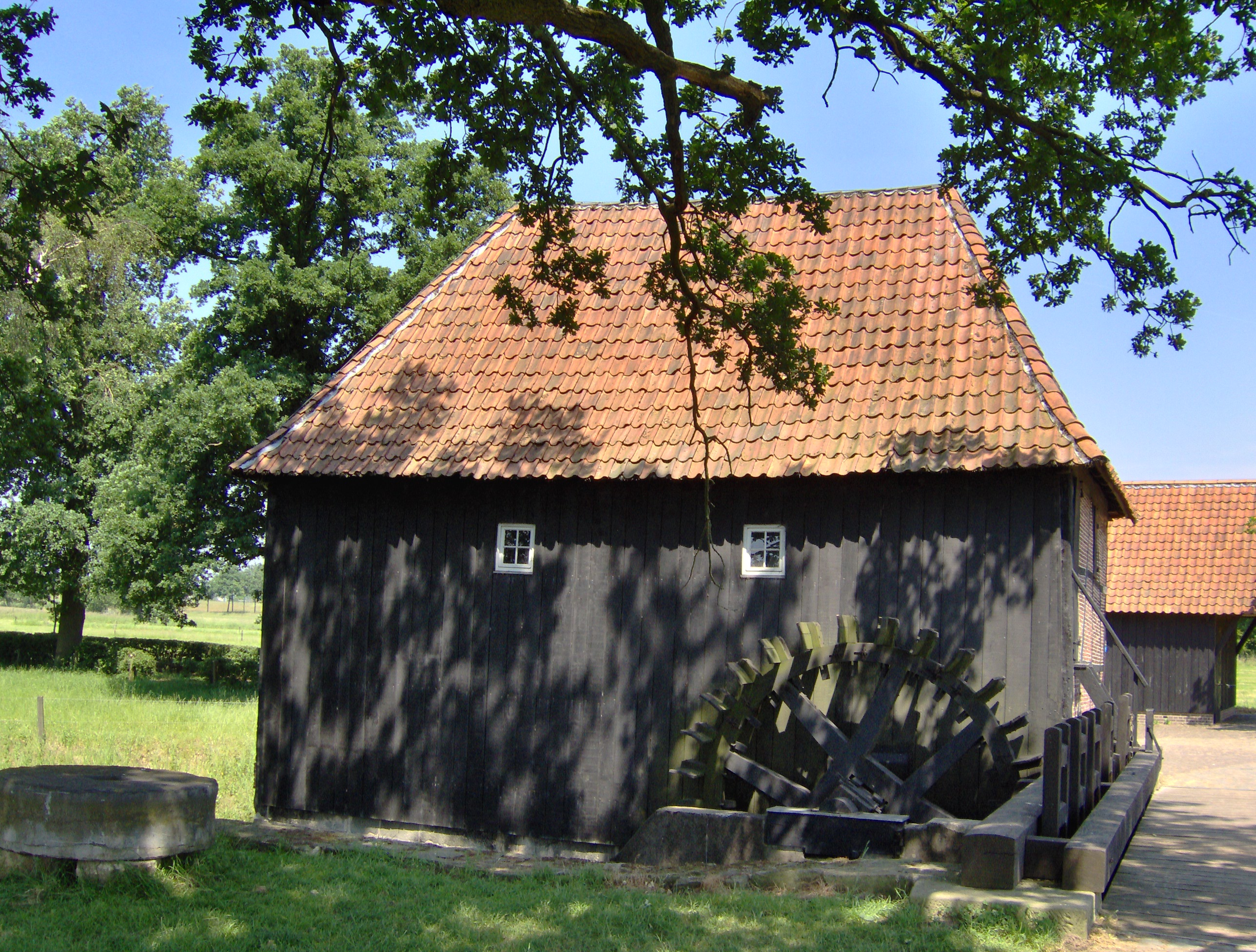
The same watermill, photographed from the other side

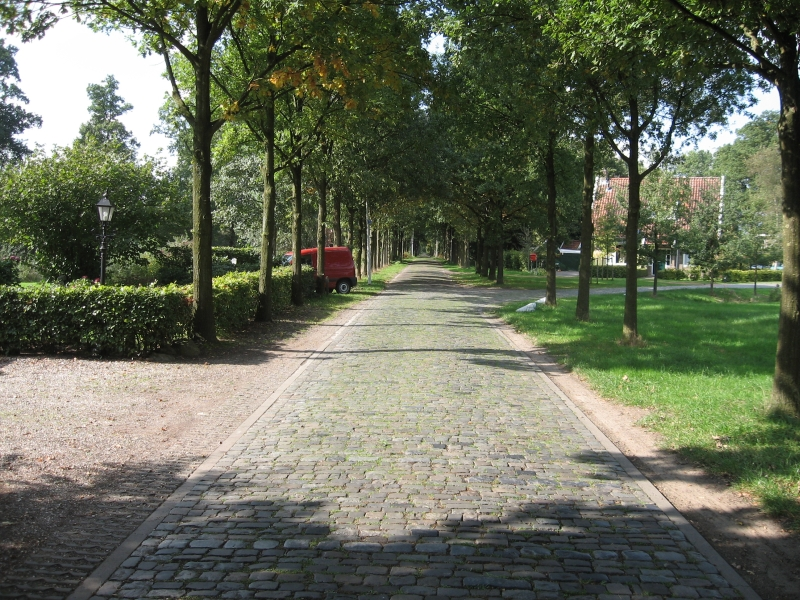
Street view

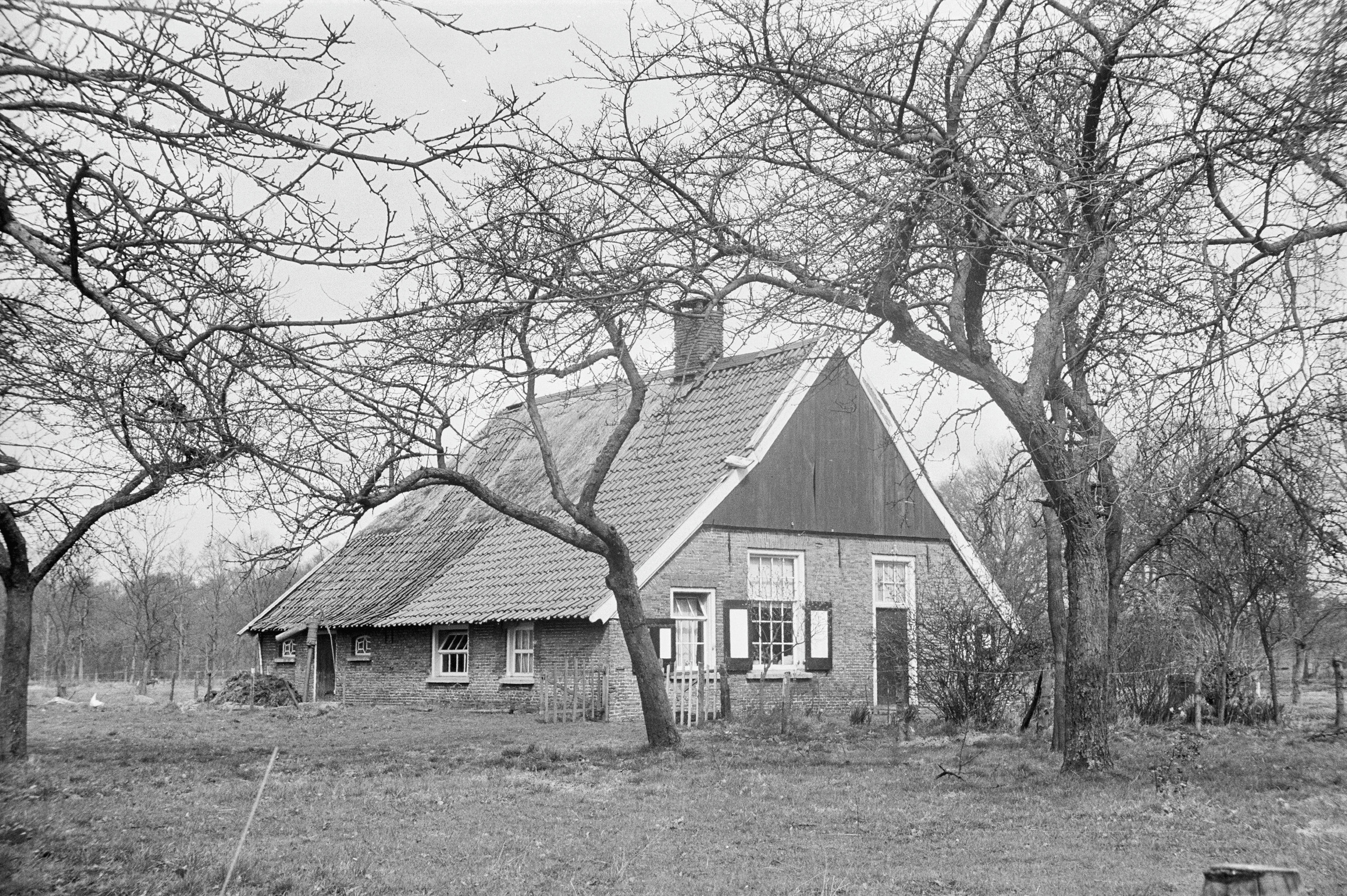
Farm in Oele
