= Hans Liska =

German painter

Hans Liska (19 November 1907 – 26 December 1983) was an Austrian artist, painter, commercial artist and illustrator.

== Biography ==
Liska was born on 19 November 1907 in Vienna, Austria-Hungary. He attended economic school and worked as a bureaucrat. A secondary job as a pianist helped him apply to University of Applied Arts Vienna. There he was a student of Berthold Löffler (a friend of Oskar Kokoschka).

Liska then worked as a commercial artist in St. Gallen, Switzerland, and went to the Königliche Kunstgewerbeschule München in Munich as a student of Emil Preetorius and Walter Teutsch.

Encouraged by Ullstein Verlag, Liska went to the Academy of Arts in Berlin on Steinplatz as a student of Ferdinand Spiegel. After World War II started, he was drafted as a soldier and an illustrator of the Wehrmacht Propaganda Troops. His drawings of various battlefields were published in many magazines, even in neutral countries. Two of his sketch books in 1942 (Junkers) and 1944 (Hans Liska) are valuable collectibles today. From 1933 to 1944, he was an illustrator for the Berliner Illustrirte Zeitung, particularly for the special issue for the 1936 Summer Olympics, and the propaganda magazine Signal. He made a drawing of the "greatest ateliers in the world", a gigantic hall, which was to be erected in Baldham near Munich by Josef Thorak after a decision by Albert Speer. This was supposed to be used for mighty group performances on the rally ground in Nuremberg. The building looks like a living model (for example a horse), then a sound form, then a four-metre-tall model and finally a colossal horse statue. A second image shows the transport of ready-made horse sculptures to railway tracks for delivery to the deployment site.

After the end of the war, Liska remained in Germany. In 1945 his Skizzenbuch aus dem Kriege, originally published in 1944 by Buhrbanck in Berlin in 1944, and all of its translations, was placed on the "proscription list of rejected literature" as number 17549.

In 1948 Liska married Elisabeth (née Schmid, born 1922) in Scheßlitz near Bamberg. The couple had two daughters, Angelika and Gabriele.

In Scheßlitz, Liska started drawing for the magazines Quick and Hörzu. He worked in advertising for years, especially for the automobile company Daimler-Benz, but also for the Colognian companies Ford and Mühlens (4711). His other employers included Galeria Kaufhof, Degussa, Märklin, Quelle, the paint company Hoechst, the Lederer Bierkontor brewery, the Sekt producer Henkell & Co. Sektkellerei and the smoke beer brewery Schlenkerla (Bamberg). His city and country books with sketches of Salzburg, Bamberg, Cologne, Kulmbach and Franconia were published starting from 1960.

The porcelain company Kaiser in Bad Staffelstein published numerous pitchers, porringers and most importantly plates bearing over 200 of Liska's illustrations of the cities of Aachen, Berlin, Danzig, Königsberg, Munich, Wrocław and others.

Liska's love of Mozart's opera brought him in connection with the picture series Zauber der Bühne, published in 1982. In his illustrated autobiography Malerisches Kulmbach (1985), Liska admitted to honouring the works of Max Ernst, Oskar Kokoscha and Pablo Picasso.

Hans Liska died in Wertheim am Main on 26 December 1983, shortly after a stroke.

== Bibliography ==
- Liska, Hans. In: Hans Vollmer (ed.): Allgemeines Lexikon der bildenden Künstler des XX. Jahrhunderts. Volume 6, index H–Z. E. A. Seemann, Leipzig 1962, p. 220.
- Paul Simsa, Hans Jürgen Sproß, Horst I. Wendt: Der Stern ihrer Sehnsucht: Plakate und Anzeigen von Mercedes-Benz; Zeitdokumente der Gebrauchskunst von 1900 bis 1960; ein Projekt der Mercedes-Benz Kulturförderung. 1st edition. Cantz, Ostfildern-Ruit 1995, ISBN 3-89322-706-7, pp. 128–135.
- Mercedes-Benz-Aktiengesellschaft (ed.): Hans Liska – Lorbeer, Lächeln, Leidenschaften. 1st edition. Motorbuch Verlag, Stuttgart 1993, ISBN 3-613-01532-3 (with biography).
- Jakob Lehmann: Appell ans Humane. Zu Leben und Werk Hans Liskas. Aus Anlaß seines hundertsten Geburtstages. Colloquium Historicum Wirsbergense, Lichtenfels 2008 (= Kleine CHW-Schriften. Volume 3). ISBN 978-3-87735-198-7.
- Harry Niemann: Die Sternenmaler. Motorbuch Verlag, 2008, ISBN 978-3-613-02864-7, pp. 50–92.
- Christof Vieweg: Hans Liska. Skizzen, Szenen, Situationen – Mit Mercedes-Benz in aller Welt. Delius Klasing Verlag, Bielefeld 2008, ISBN 978-3-7688-2464-4.
