= Balduin Wolff =

German painter and chess player

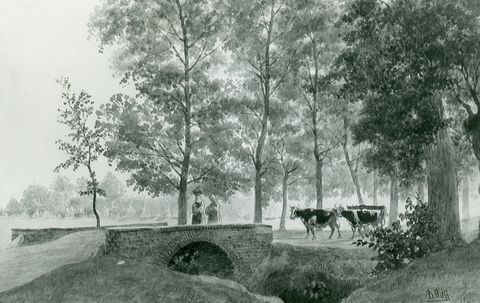
"Düsselthal", a watercolour by Wolff, 1865

(Hermann) Balduin Wolff (15 July 1819 – 21 November 1907) was a German painter of the Romantic period, and a chess player.

Born in Schmiedeberg im Riesengebirge (now Kowary), Silesia (then Prussia, now Poland), he graduated from a gymnasium of Hirschberg, and studied at Berlin University of the Arts (Universität der Künste Berlin) and Kunstakademie Düsseldorf (Staatliche Kunstakademie Düsseldorf).

He drew a game with Louis Paulsen in a blindfold simultaneous display at Düsseldorf in 1862.
