= Alpine Pool =

Painting by John Singer Sargent

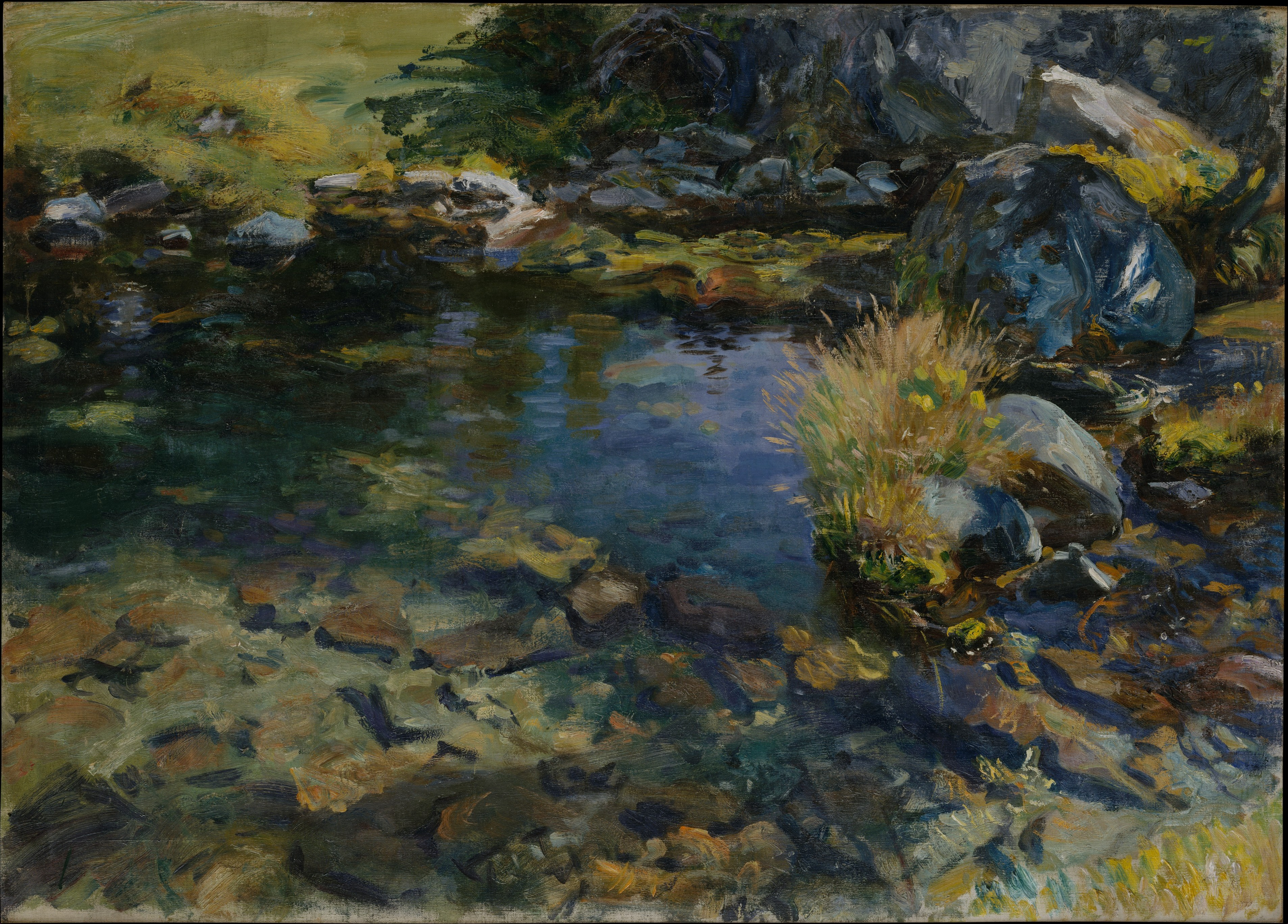
- Artist: John Singer Sargent
- Year: 1907
- Medium: oil paint, canvas
- Dimensions: 69.9 cm (27.5 in) × 96.5 cm (38.0 in)
- Location: Metropolitan Museum of Art
- Accession no.: 50.130.15
- Identifiers: The Met object ID: 12028

Alpine Pool is a 1907 painting by John Singer Sargent. It is part of the collection of the Metropolitan Museum of Art.

The work is one of a series of paintings of a small Alpine stream that Sargent executed while staying in the small village of Purtud in the Val d’Aosta, Northern Italy. In this painting, the artist was attempting to record in close-up the effect of sunlight on still clear water lying between a border of rocks and foliage.

It is on view at the Metropolitan Museum of Art, Fifth Avenue, New York in Gallery 770.

== See also ==
- List of works by John Singer Sargent
