= The Red Cloud =

Painting by Piet Mondrian

The red cloud
- Red Cloud
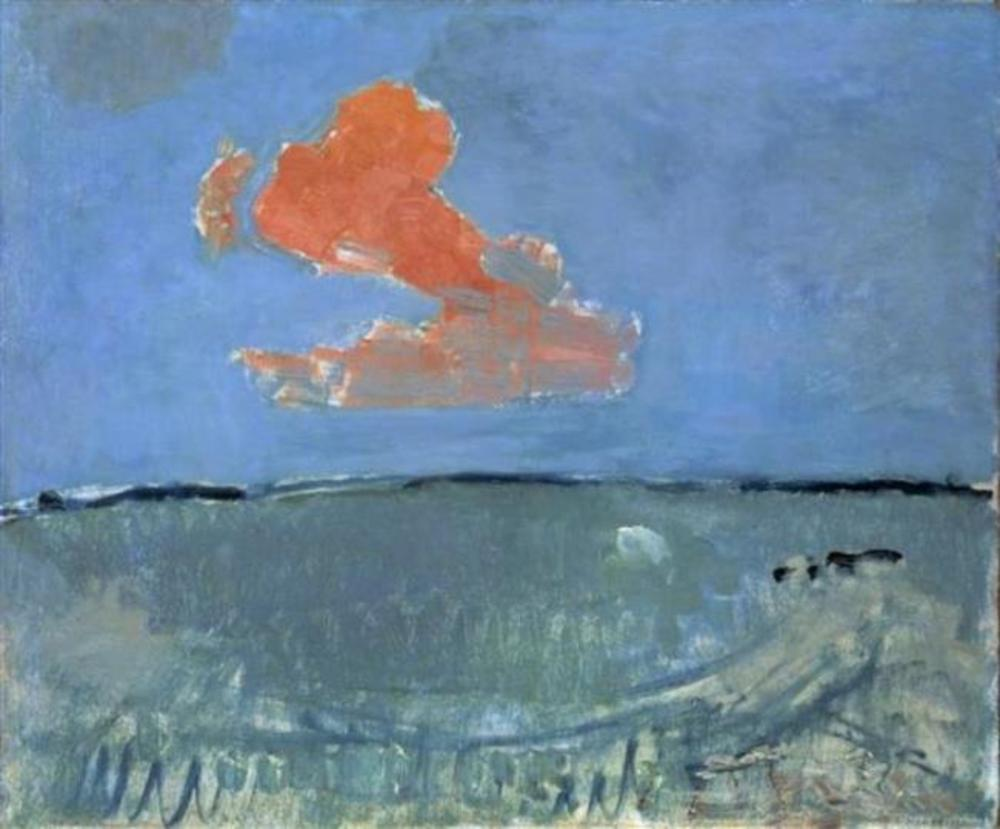
- Artist: Piet Mondrian
- Year: 1907
- Medium: oil paint, cardboard
- Dimensions: 64 cm (25 in) × 75 cm (30 in)
- Location: Kunstmuseum Den Haag
- Accession no.: 0333219
- Identifiers: RKDimages ID: 268652

The Red Cloud (De rode wolk) is a 1907 early painting by the Dutch artist Piet Mondrian. It was painted in 1907. Mondrian completed the painting while staying near Oele (municipality of Hengelo), in the east of the Netherlands. One art historian has noted that the "hard colour contrasts and charged, expressive brushwork" is part of Mondrian's evolution towards an abstract painter.

The artwork is part of the collection of the Kunstmuseum Den Haag, in The Hague. It was acquired by the museum in 1956, as a gift from Albert Pieter van den Briel, who had owned the painting since 1908.

In the same period, in 1908, Mondrian also painted "Woods near Oele" (Bos bij Oele), which is also in the collection of Kunstmuseum Den Haag.
