= Self-Portrait with a Blue Sketchbook =

1907 painting by Léon Spilliaert

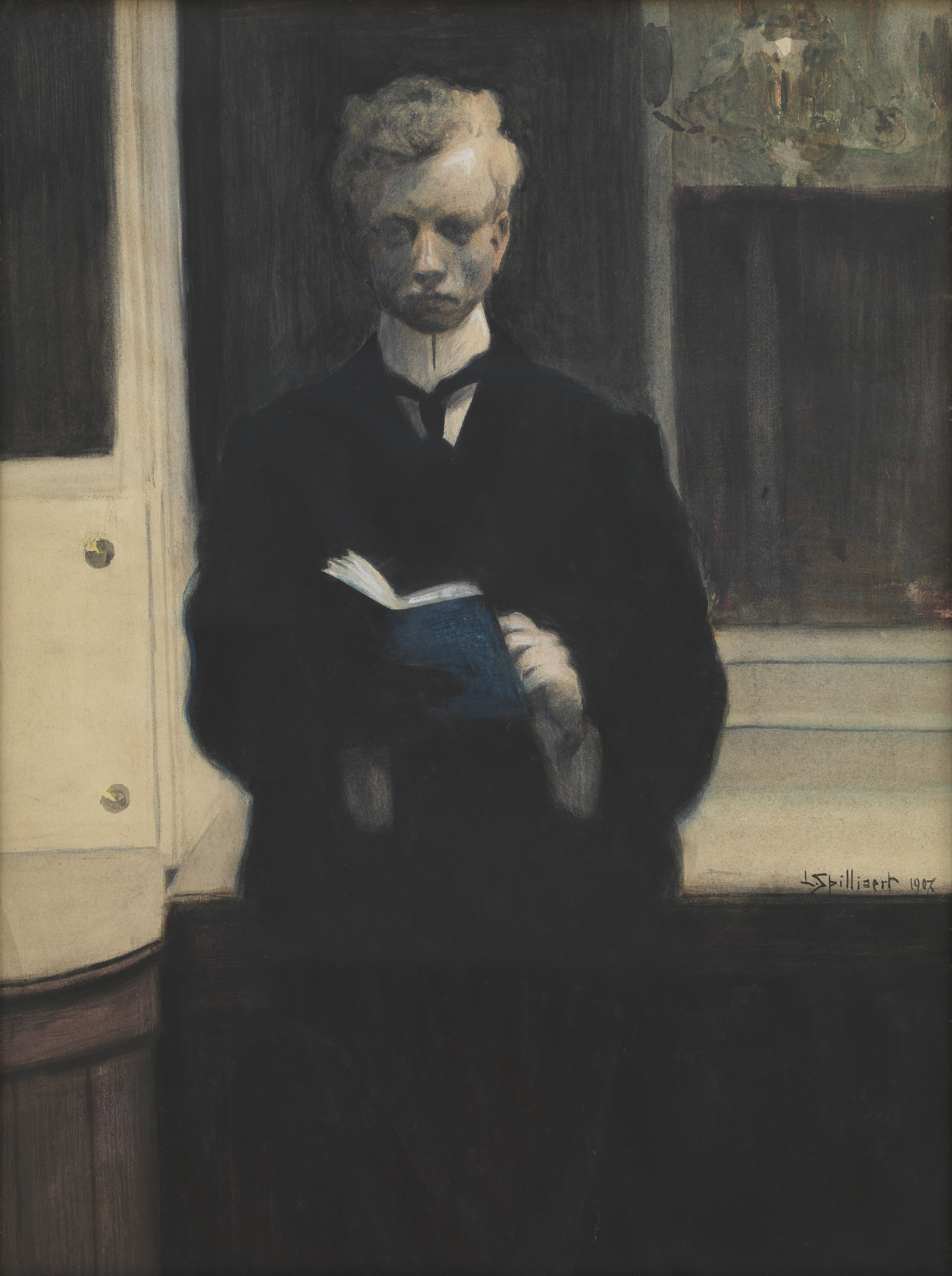
Self-Portrait with a Blue Sketchbook (1907) by Léon Spilliaert

Self-Portrait with a Blue Sketchbook is a 1907 watercolour painting by Belgian artist Léon Spilliaert. It is part of a series of ten self-portraits produced by him between 1907 and 1908. It has been in the collection of the Royal Museum of Fine Arts, Antwerp since 1950.
