= Margaret Barker (artist) =

British artist (1907–2003

- Born: Margaret Dorothy Barker; 6 June 1907; Sydenham, London, England
- Died: 2003 (aged 95–96); Sydenham, London, England
- Other names: Margaret Pringle
- Education: Royal College of Art
- Occupation: Artist
- Spouse: Kenneth Pringle (m. 1938; died 1983)
- Awards: Prix de Rome

Margaret Dorothy Barker (6 June 1907 – 2003) was a British artist.

== Biography ==
Margaret Barker was born in Sydenham, South London, on 6 June 1907. She was awarded a scholarship in 1925 to Royal College of Art, where she was under the tutelage of William Rothenstein and Randolph Schwabe. In school, she submitted her work for the Prix de Rome and exhibited it at the New English Art Club.

After leaving school, in 1929, she taught art at girls' schools near Birmingham, until her marriage to Kenneth Pringle, a dental surgeon, in 1938. They lived in central London until the blitz. Margaret and her son escaped to the Devon coast from the bombing, to return after the war.

Barker mostly produced landscapes but also painted friends and imaginative portraits. After their son died in the 1960s, Barker and her husband moved to North Kent, where her painting trailed off, only producing a few watercolour landscapes. Kenneth Pringle died in March 1983, and Barker returned to Sydenham.

Her work is in the permanent collection of the Tate Gallery.
