= 1981 in fine arts of the Soviet Union =

The year 1981 was marked by many events that left an imprint on the history of Soviet and Russian Fine Arts.

== Events ==
- All-Russian Art Exhibition named «Across of Motherland» was opened in Moscow. The participants were Nikolai Galakhov, Mikhail Kaneev, Maya Kopitseva, Mikhail Kozell, Yaroslav Krestovsky, Oleg Lomakin, Dmitry Maevsky, Ivan Savenko, Vladimir Sakson, Nikolai Timkov, Vitaly Tulenev, and other important artists
- Traditional Exhibition of works of Leningrad artists - the Great Patriotic War veterans was opened in the Leningrad Union of Artists on the eve of Victory Day (9 May).
- Exhibition of works by German Egoshin was opened in the Leningrad Union of Artists.
- Exhibition of works by Krum Dzhakov was opened in the Leningrad Union of Artists.
- Exhibition of works by Zaven Arshakuny was opened in the Leningrad Union of Artists.
- Exhibition of works by Gleb Verner was opened in the Leningrad Union of Artists.

== Deaths ==
- November 28 — Alexander Debler (Russian: Деблер Александр Адольфович), Russian soviet painter, graphic artist, and art educator (born 1908).

== See also ==
- List of Russian artists
- List of painters of Leningrad Union of Artists
- Saint Petersburg Union of Artists
- Russian culture

== Sources ==
- Всероссийская художественная выставка «По родной стране». Каталог. М., Советский художник, 1981.
- Егошин Герман Павлович. Выставка произведений. Каталог. Л., Художник РСФСР, 1981.
- Крум Стефанович Джаков. Выставка произведений. Каталог. Л., Художник РСФСР, 1981.
- Вернер Глеб Владимирович. Выставка произведений. Каталог. Л., Художник РСФСР, 1981.
- Аршакуни Завен Петросович. Выставка произведений. Каталог. Л., Художник РСФСР, 1981.
- Серов Владимир Александрович. Каталог выставки произведений. Живопись, графика. М., Советский художник, 1981.
- Artists of Peoples of the USSR. Biography Dictionary. Vol. 1. Moscow, Iskusstvo, 1970.
- Artists of Peoples of the USSR. Biography Dictionary. Vol. 2. Moscow, Iskusstvo, 1972.
- Directory of Members of Union of Artists of USSR. Volume 1,2. Moscow, Soviet Artist Edition, 1979.
- Directory of Members of the Leningrad branch of the Union of Artists of Russian Federation. Leningrad, Khudozhnik RSFSR, 1980.
- Artists of Peoples of the USSR. Biography Dictionary. Vol. 4 Book 1. Moscow, Iskusstvo, 1983.
- Directory of Members of the Leningrad branch of the Union of Artists of Russian Federation. - Leningrad: Khudozhnik RSFSR, 1987.
- Artists of peoples of the USSR. Biography Dictionary. Vol. 4 Book 2. - Saint Petersburg: Academic project humanitarian agency, 1995.
- Link of Times: 1932 - 1997. Artists - Members of Saint Petersburg Union of Artists of Russia. Exhibition catalogue. - Saint Petersburg: Manezh Central Exhibition Hall, 1997.
- Matthew C. Bown. Dictionary of 20th Century Russian and Soviet Painters 1900-1980s. - London: Izomar, 1998.
- Vern G. Swanson. Soviet Impressionism. - Woodbridge, England: Antique Collectors' Club, 2001.
- Петр Фомин. Живопись. Воспоминания современников. СПб., 2002. С.107.
- Время перемен. Искусство 1960—1985 в Советском Союзе. СПб., Государственный Русский музей, 2006.
- Sergei V. Ivanov. Unknown Socialist Realism. The Leningrad School. - Saint-Petersburg: NP-Print Edition, 2007. - ISBN 5-901724-21-6, ISBN 978-5-901724-21-7.
- Anniversary Directory graduates of Saint Petersburg State Academic Institute of Painting, Sculpture, and Architecture named after Ilya Repin, Russian Academy of Arts. 1915 - 2005. - Saint Petersburg: Pervotsvet Publishing House, 2007.
