= A Rose =

Painting by Thomas Anshutz

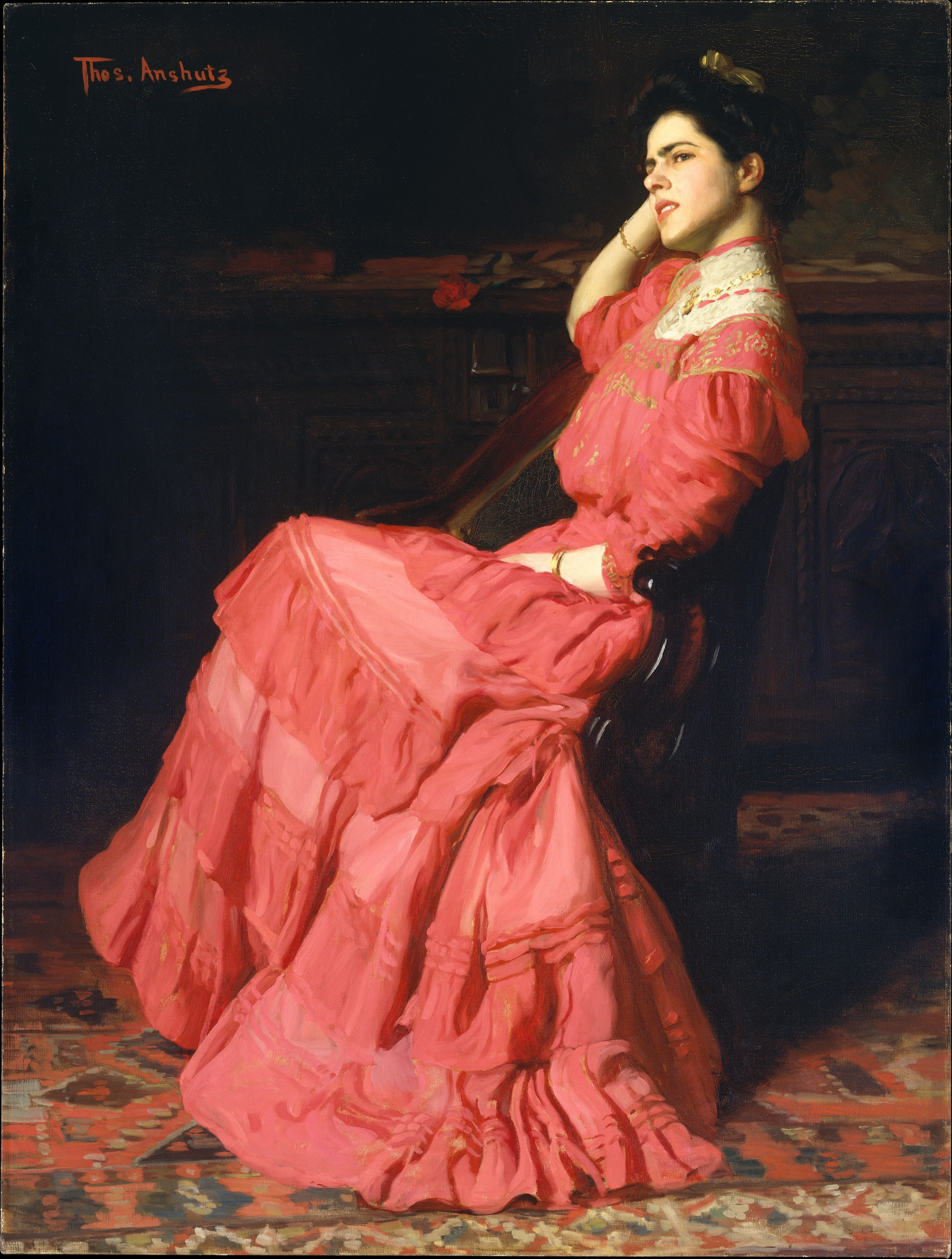
- Artist: Thomas Anshutz
- Year: 1907
- Medium: Oil on canvas
- Subject: Rebecca H. Whelen
- Dimensions: 147.3 cm × 111.4 cm (58.0 in × 43.9 in)
- Location: Metropolitan Museum of Art; New York City
- Accession: 1993.324

A Rose is an early 20th-century painting by American artist Thomas Anshutz. Done in oil on canvas, the work depicts a young woman, Rebecca H. Whelen, sitting in a chair wearing a rose-colored dress. The painting, in keeping with artistic themes of the early 20th-century, compares a woman and her attire to a rose flower, but also evokes the sense that the young woman is intellectually and emotionally alert. Whelen herself was the daughter of a trustee of the Pennsylvania Academy of the Fine Arts at which Anshutz was a long-time teacher.

Anshutz's work has been compared to that of his contemporary Thomas Eakins (specifically Eakins' 1900 portrait The Thinker) and to Diego Velázquez.

A Rose is in the collection of the Metropolitan Museum of Art.
