= Margaret Taylor Fox =

American painter, illustrator, and etcher

Margaret Mason Taylor Fox (26 July 1857 – 1942) was an American painter, illustrator, and etcher.

Born in Philadelphia, Fox was a student of Peter Moran and Thomas Pollock Anshutz. She taught for a time in the public schools of New Haven, Connecticut, and in 1905 was serving as treasurer of the Teachers' Art Club of New Haven. She is known best as a book illustrator, but she exhibited other work as well, presenting eight etchings at the Union League Club's exhibit "Work of Women Etchers in America" in 1888. Little else is recorded of her career, but she is known to have been in the Washington, D.C. area in 1895; references place her there again between 1926 and 1941. She died in 1942 in Thomaston, Connecticut.

Seven etchings by Fox, including The Burns Cottage, Washington, D.C. are owned by the National Museum of American History. Twelve etchings, including Near Darby Road, Shark River, N.J., eight impressions of Berry Gatherers and two of Pasture Land, are in the collection of the Pennsylvania Academy of the Fine Arts; all date to between 1884 and 1887. Her work is also in the collection of the Metropolitan Museum of Art, the Philadelphia Museum of Art, and the Syracuse University Art Museum,

== Gallery ==
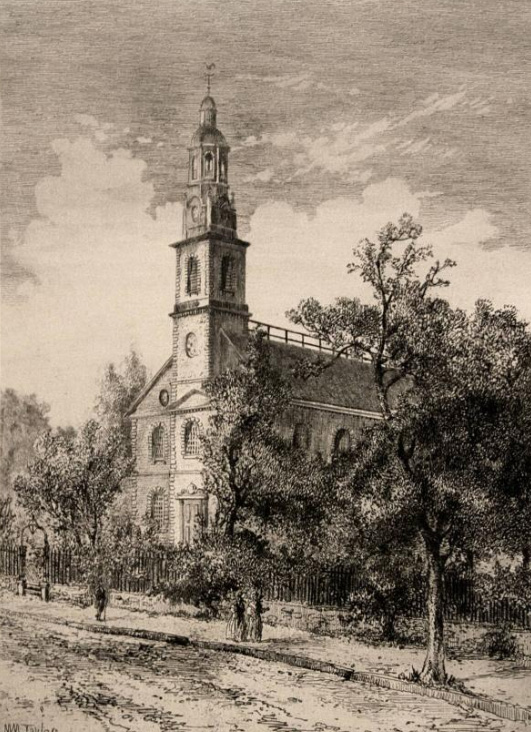
Collegiate Church of New York City

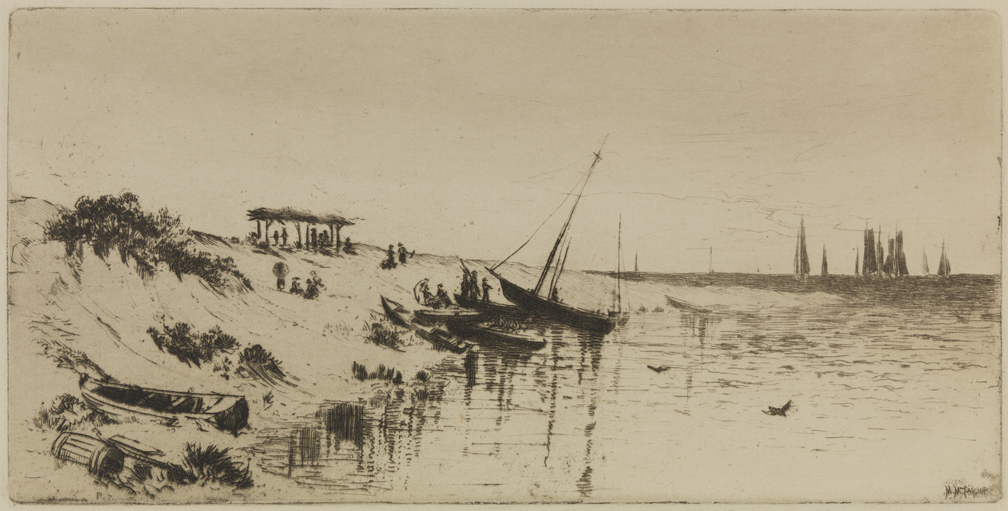
Shark River, N. J

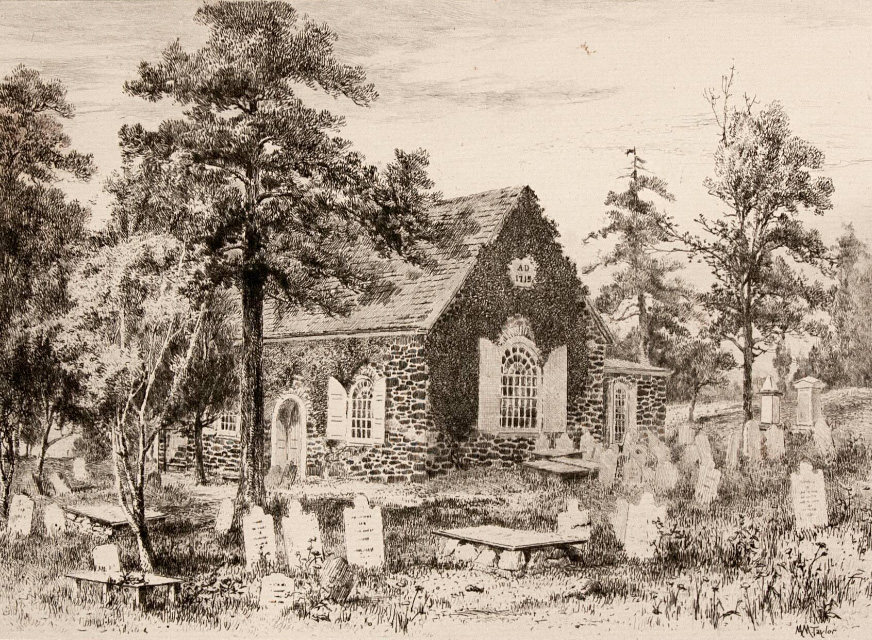
St. David’s Church Radnor, PA
