= Hubert Davis (artist) =

American lithography artist and painter

Hubert Davis (1902–1981) was an American lithography artist and painter. His most notable works were created during the Great Depression as a reflection of the lifestyle of the United States working class.

== Biography ==
Born in Milton, Pennsylvania, in 1902, Davis studied at the Art Students League of New York in the 1920s. His works—depictions of landscapes and figure studies executed on oil on canvas and watercolour—were first exhibited in 1925. The earliest and most renowned of Davis's lithographic pieces were produced in 1931: a medium he devoted himself to, some of Davis's best known lithographs include Costume Designs, Seaboard Castle, and Pier 50, North River.

An active figure in the New York art community, like many of his contemporaries, Davis was highly influenced by the American working class's lifestyle and the hardships endured during the Great Depression. Many of Davis's prints were published by the New York branch of Works Progress Administration (WPA), a federal program that provided financial aid for thousands of artists in exchange for public works. Without the WPA, Davis's works, along with those of other contemporaries, may never have achieved the same acclaim.

Davis's popularity peaked in the 1930s; details of his life and artistic career following that decade are sparse.

Hubert Davis died in 1981.

== Legacy ==
Artist and educator Ronald K. DeLong, through a family association, came to be the caretaker of a vast trove of Davis's work left behind in a farmhouse-studio in rural Pennsylvania. Subsequently Delong worked to catalog and ready the work for a series of exhibitions in 2017. A triple interconnected series of exhibitions of Davis' work is being shown in the spring and summer of 2017, on view in the Greater Allentown, Pennsylvania area. These were: "Hubert Davis: Scenes of Pennsylvania" at the Ron K. DeLong Gallery at Penn State Lehigh Valley in Central Valley, Pennsylvania (catalogue essay by Vincent DiCicco); "Hubert Davis: Foreign Lands", curated by Deborah Rabinsky at the Bradbury-Sullivan LGBT Community Center in Allentown, Pennsylvania, and “Hubert Davis: Costume Design” at the 514 Gallery in Allentown, Pennsylvania.
