= The Bronco Buster =

1895 sculpture by Frederic Remington

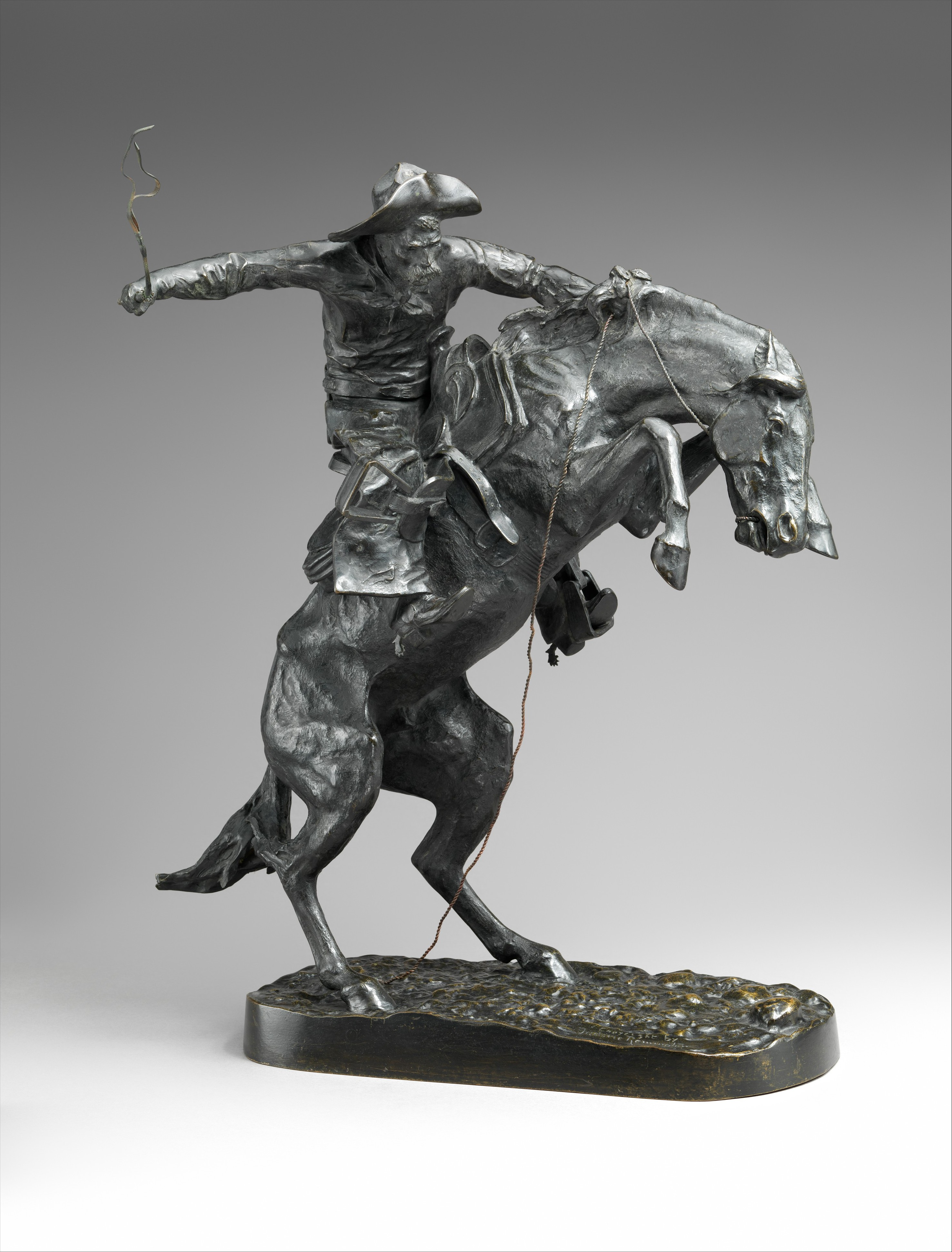
Broncho Buster by Frederic Remington

The Bronco Buster (also The Broncho Buster per convention at the time of sculpting) is a sculpture made of bronze copyrighted in 1895 by American artist Frederic Remington. It portrays a rugged cowboy character fighting to stay aboard a rearing, plunging bucking horse, with a stirrup swinging free, a quirt in one hand and a fistful of mane and reins in the other. It was the first and remains the most popular of all of Remington's sculptures.

The sculpture was executed in the summer of 1895, and later that fall it was copyrighted with the United States Copyright Office. He took his subject from a number of his former sketches. The earliest one was A Bucking Bronco, an illustration to Theodore Roosevelt's article in the March 1888 issue of Century Magazine entitled "The Home Ranch". Another Remington sketch entitled A Pitching Bronco, was published in the April 30, 1892, issue of Harper's Weekly. Sculpting was a new medium for Remington at this time, and this new method of portrayal was a total success in the eyes of his collectors and art historians. Breaking away from the restricted limits of flat paper, pen and ink and watercolor, Remington moved to the next level of his artistic potential, through the more effective medium of three-dimensional expressions. Remington, who always strove to capture the essence of the moment in his work, now found he was more able to effectively express that which he had observed first hand:

Only those who have ridden a bronco the first time it was saddled, or have lived through a railroad accident, can form any conception of the solemnity of such experiences. Few Eastern people appreciate the sky-rocket bounds, grunts, and stiff-legged striking.

With this in mind, he decided to sculpt a bucking bronco for his first piece. Using techniques from his previous works to help focus the subject's figure, Remington removed the figure from its context and isolated it into a grounded free-floating form, thus achieving a lifelike quality and vigorous movement. The artist's reference file for the sculpture included a photograph of a cowboy that very closely resembled his 1892 illustration of A Bucking Bronco. The Bronco Buster followed the same kind of process liberating horse and man from two-dimensionality as before.

On September 13, 1898, at Camp Wickoff at Montauk Point, New York, the Rough Riders gave Theodore Roosevelt a casting of The Bronco Buster. Of the gift Remington said it was "the greatest compliment I ever had...After this everything will be mere fuss." Roosevelt responded, "There could have been no more appropriate gift from such a regiment." The cast which Theodore Roosevelt's Rough Riders gave him is now at the Sagamore Hill National Historic Site, Oyster Bay, New York.

An original cast resided in the Oval Office, a gift of Virginia Hatfield and Mrs. Louis Hatfield Stickney, from Jimmy Carter's to Donald Trump's administrations. It was moved out of the office during the Biden administration.

Another original Remington sculpture, The Cowboy, 1907, is located along Kelly Drive (formerly known as East River Drive) in Fairmount Park, Philadelphia. It is Remington's only commissioned sculpture and only monument, and a different sculpture from The Bronco Buster.

== In popular culture ==
The Oval Office statue can be seen in the 2009 photograph Hair Like Mine.

In 2014, the Denver Art Museum made a bet with the Seattle Art Museum over the outcome of Super Bowl XLVIII, wherein the losing city's museum would temporarily loan the other a work of art. Denver put up a cast of Bronco Buster against Seattle's Sound of Waves, a 1901 Japanese screen by artist Tsuji Kakō. As the Denver Broncos lost to the Seattle Seahawks, the bronze was shipped to Seattle where it was scheduled to be on display for three months.

== See also ==
- Art in the White House
