= Kako Band =

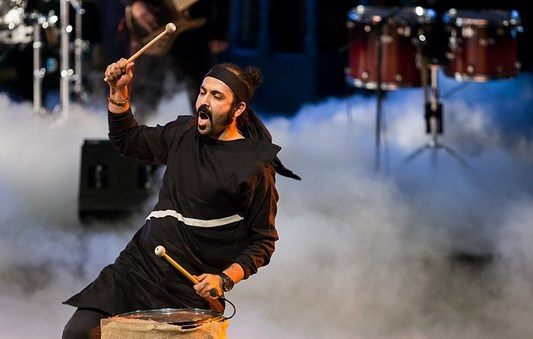
- a Kako Band performance in a national music ceremony

Background information
- Origin: Iran
- Genres: Indie rock, world music, electronic
- Years active: 2013–present
- Label: KAKOBAND
- Members: nimasarafi pouyasarafi
- Website: www.kakoband.com

"Fall"
The lyrics of "Fall" a song by Kako band, on their Invite album.

Kako Band (Persian: کاکو بند) is an Iranian new-style integrative and vocal Fusion band. In 2013 Kako band produced and released its first album called Invite The band has also performed the soundtrack of the Iranian TV show Aspirin called Fall. They sing in idioglossia and/or conlang.
