= Tsuji Kakō =

Japanese painter (1870–1931)

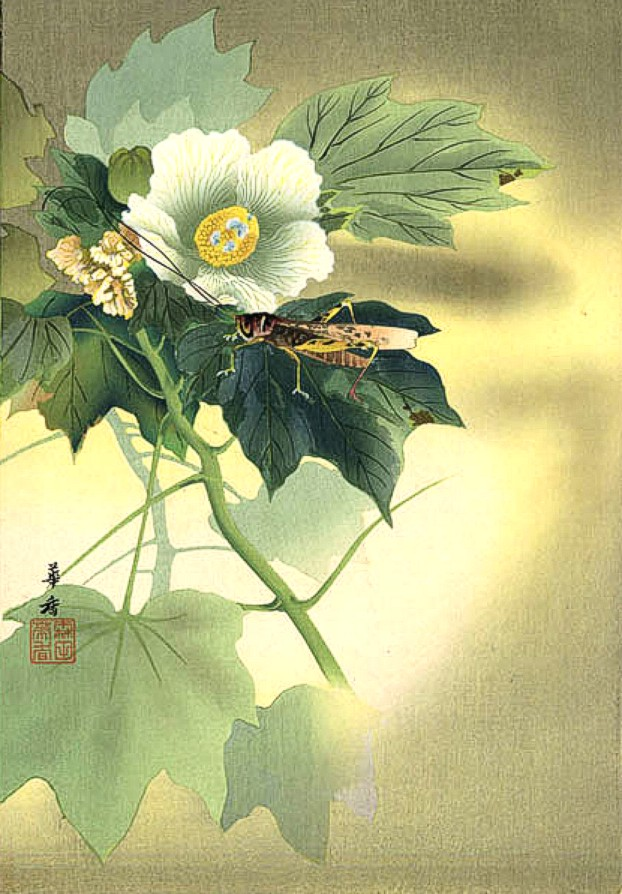
Grasshopper on flowering plant

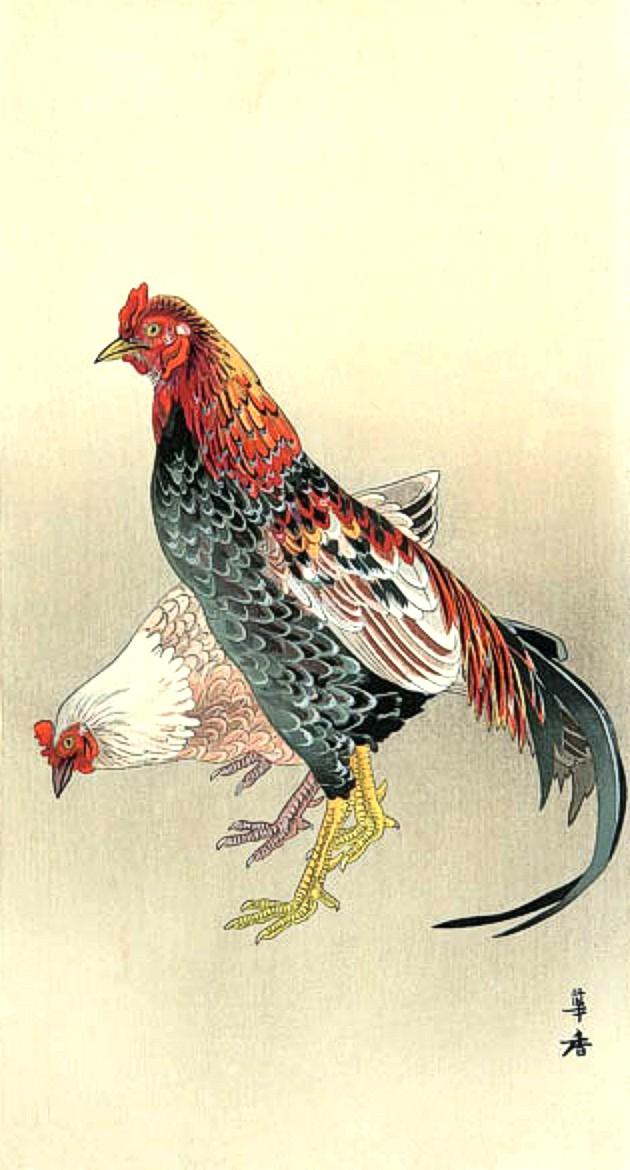
Rooster and hen

Tsuji Kakō (December 1870 in Kyoto – 1931) was a Japanese painter, trained by Kōno Bairei both in the Maruyama and Shijō schools of painting. His Zen training, which he started in 1899, influenced much of his painting style and led to his name being associated with the unconventional.

Tsuji Kakō became one of the leading figures of the Shijō and Maruyama movements, with Takeuchi Seihō, Kikuchi Hōbun, Taniguchi Kōkyō and Yamamoto Shunkyo. Because of his individual approach and his refusal to be politically correct, Kakō's work never acquired the same appeal and cachet as that of his contemporaries.

In the last ten years of the Meiji era, Kakō became preoccupied with the study of waves, his style breaking with tradition and becoming highly idiosyncratic. During this period Kakō also experimented with the use of colour. His lack of conformity adversely affected his popularity; even so his work came in for scrutiny and critical commentary in many contemporary articles.
