= Art Frahm =

American painter and illustrator

- Frahm painting c. 1950s
- Born: Arthur Ernest Frahm; May 27, 1906; East Chicago, Indiana, U.S.
- Died: February 12, 1981 (aged 74); Fountain Inn, South Carolina, U.S.
- Years active: 1920–1980s
- Known for: Pin-up art; commercial art

Arthur Ernest Frahm (May 5, 1906 – February 12, 1981) was an American painter and commercial artist, best known for his campy paintings of pin-up girls in the 1950s. Frahm's playful Americana style has been compared with that of Norman Rockwell.

== Biography ==
Frahm was born in East Chicago, Indiana, in 1906. As a child, he was an avid drawer, and later took weekend classes at the Art Institute of Chicago. He subsequently joined the Chicago firm Ziprodt, designing window displays for merchants, before resigning to become a full time illustrator. For the rest of his career, Frahm ran his own studio as a freelancer. Beginning in the 1920s, he illustrated advertisements for a wide variety of companies, including Coca-Cola, Schlitz, Quaker Oats, and Libby's. Frahm continued to paint during his service in the U.S. Army during World War II.

Frahm's commercial peak was in the 1950s. Each installment of his "ladies in distress" pin-up series featured a woman whose underwear had fallen to her ankles in an everyday situation—such as carrying groceries, bowling, or changing a tire—much to the delight of male onlookers. Frahm's publisher, Joseph C. Hoover and Sons, sold millions of calendars with the campy artwork, making it one of the most successful pinup series of the twentieth century.

In the 1960s, Frahm created two popular calendar series: one following a band of fun-loving hobos traveling from Miami to San Francisco, and another depicting policemen teaching safety measures to children. Later in his career, while continuing to do commercial work, Frahm's tastes shifted to portraits and landscapes.

Frahm moved his family to North Carolina in 1954 before setting in Fountain Inn, South Carolina, where he died on February 12, 1981, aged 74. He was survived by his wife Ruth and daughter Diana.

== See also ==
- Pin-up girl
- List of pin-up artists
