= Thomas Pollock Anshutz =

American painter and teacher

Thomas Anshutz
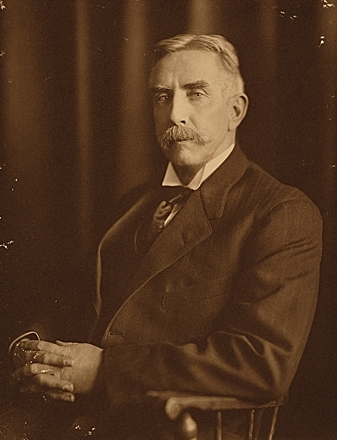
- Anshutz, ca. 1900
- Born: Thomas Pollock Anshutz; October 5, 1851; Newport, Kentucky; United States
- Died: June 16, 1912 (aged 60); Fort Washington, Pennsylvania; United States
- Education: National Academy of Design; Pennsylvania Academy of the Fine Arts; Académie Julian
- Known for: Painter, arts administrator
- Notable work: The Ironworkers' Noontime
- Spouse: Effie Shriver Russell (m. 1892–)
- Awards: Silver, 1904 World's Fair; Gold, 1909, Pennsylvania Academy; Gold, 1910, Buenos Aires International Exposition

Thomas Pollock Anshutz (October 5, 1851 – June 16, 1912) was an American painter and teacher. Known for his portraiture and genre scenes, Anshutz was a co-founder of The Darby School. One of Thomas Eakins's most prominent students, he succeeded Eakins as director of drawing and painting classes at the Pennsylvania Academy of Fine Arts.

== Personal life and education ==
Anshutz was born on October 5, 1851, in Newport, Kentucky. He grew up in Newport and Wheeling, West Virginia. His early art instruction took place at the National Academy of Design in the early 1870s, where he studied under Lemuel Wilmarth. In 1875, he moved to Philadelphia, and studied with Thomas Eakins at the Philadelphia Sketch Club, beginning a close association between the two.

In 1892, Anshutz married Effie Shriver Russell. The two spent their honeymoon in Paris, where Anshutz attended classes at Académie Julian. In 1893 they returned to Philadelphia. Later in his life he proclaimed himself a socialist. He retired from teaching in the fall of 1911 due to poor health and died on June 16, 1912.

== Career ==
=== Association with Eakins and The Ironworkers' Noontime ===
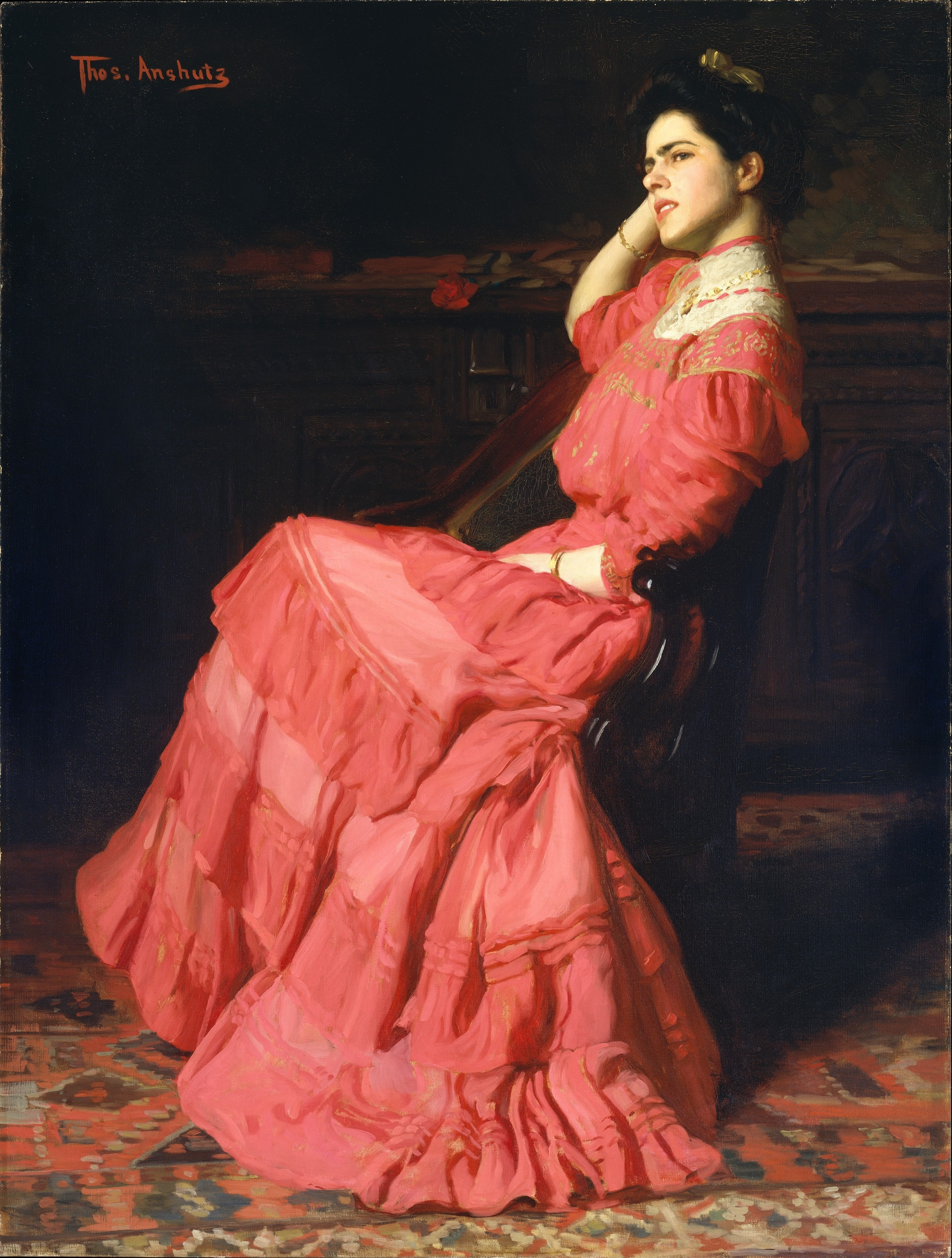
A Rose, 1907, Metropolitan Museum of Art

In 1876, Anshutz enrolled as a student at the Pennsylvania Academy of the Fine Arts, the same year Thomas Eakins began teaching there. Eakins was Chief Demonstrator of Anatomy and Christian Schussele was Professor of Drawing and Painting. In 1878 Anshutz became Eakins's assistant, eventually succeeding Eakins as Chief Demonstrator when Eakins was promoted to Professor of Drawing and Painting. In 1880, while still a student, Anshutz completed his first major work, The Ironworkers' Noontime.

The Ironworkers' Noontime, Anshutz's most well known painting, depicts twenty-or-so workers on their break in the yard of a foundry. Painted near Wheeling, West Virginia, it is conceived in a naturalistic style similar to that of Eakins, although Eakins never painted industrial subjects. The piece was exhibited at the Philadelphia Sketch Club in 1881 and compared to Eakins's work by art critics. Art historian Randall C. Griffin has written of it: "One of the first American paintings to depict the bleakness of factory life, The Ironworkers' Noontime appears to be a clear indictment of industrialization. Its brutal candor startled critics, who saw it as unexpectedly confrontational—a chilling industrial snapshot not the least picturesque or sublime." It is now in the collection of the Fine Arts Museums of San Francisco.

Around 1880, Eakins became involved in photography, incorporating it into his classes and using it as a tool for his artwork. Anshutz and other students at the academy started to make use of the camera, posing models and making prints for study. Anshutz participated in Eakins's The Naked Series, photographing nude models in seven pre-defined standing poses. He modeled for Eakins himself, along with colleagues such as J. Laurie Wallace and Covington Few Seiss, who would pose outdoors nude, often wrestling, swimming and boxing. Eadweard Muybridge eventually made his way to Philadelphia and Anshutz and Eakins helped build Muybridge's zoopraxiscope.

=== Loincloth incident ===
Eakins was forced to resign from the academy in an 1886 scandal that was sparked by his use of a fully nude male model in front of either an all-female or a mixed-male-and-female class. Anshutz did not defend his mentor; he co-signed a letter to the Philadelphia Sketch Club: "We hereby charge Mr. Thom^{s} Eakins with conduct unworthy of a gentleman & discreditable to this organization & ask his expulsion from the club."

=== Maturity ===
Anshutz was promoted to Eakins's position at the academy. Anshutz would briefly travel to Europe, focusing primarily on his teaching in Philadelphia. Numerous artists studied under Anshutz, including Elizabeth Sparhawk-Jones, George Luks, Charles Demuth, John Sloan, Charles Sheeler, Everett Shinn, John Marin, William Glackens, Edward Redfield, Robert Henri and Margaret Taylor Fox. As a teacher, Anshutz, according to art historian Sanford Schwartz, "was known as much for his approachability as his sarcasm, which apparently wasn't of the withering variety."

In 1906, Anshutz painted the Portrait of Marthe Kientz, a French national from Biarritz who traveled alone to Philadelphia to commission her portrait at the PAFA. This represents a documented reversal of the predominant transatlantic patronage flow of the period: between 1870 and 1914, it was American heiresses who crossed the Atlantic to Europe to commission their portraits — for example from painters such as Alexandre Cabanel, Carolus Duran and John Singer Sargent — not European women traveling to America. The portrait is also notable for its direct frontal gaze, which contrasts with the introspective and contemplative poses characteristic of American female portraiture of the Eakins tradition, and with the broader convention of the averted female gaze in Western portraiture of the period.

The Anshutz family regularly vacationed in Holly Beach, New Jersey which served as a creative place for the painter. There he experimented with watercolors, bright color palette, and simple compositions. He also photographed the natural environment, utilizing the images as studies for paintings, specifically Holly Beach and trips down the Delaware and Maurice rivers. Although Anshutz experimented persistently with landscape painting, he was more well known for his portraiture, which won him numerous awards in the 1890s and 1900s. In 1898 he and Hugh Breckenridge co-founded the Darby School, a summer school outside of Philadelphia which emphasized plein air painting. At Darby, Anshutz created his most abstract works, a series of bright oil landscape paintings that were never exhibited. He continued to participate in the Darby School until 1910. He was elected as an Associate member of the National Academy of Design in 1910. He served as president of the Philadelphia Sketch Club.

== Death and legacy ==
He died after an illness on June 16, 1912, at his home in Fort Washington, Pennsylvania.

In 1971 Robert and Joy McCarty, who lived in the home formerly owned by the Anshutz family in Fort Washington, Pennsylvania, donated a portion of letters, glass negatives, and photographs to the Archives of American Art. A second donation from the Anshutz family took place in 1971 and 1972. The materials were microfilmed and returned to the family.

== Notable collections ==
- Boys with a Boat, Ohio River, near Wheeling, West Virginia, 1880; Smithsonian American Art Museum
- Dissecting Room, ca. 1879; Pennsylvania Academy of the Fine Arts
- Two Boys by a Boat, 1895; Carnegie Museum of Art

=== Gallery ===
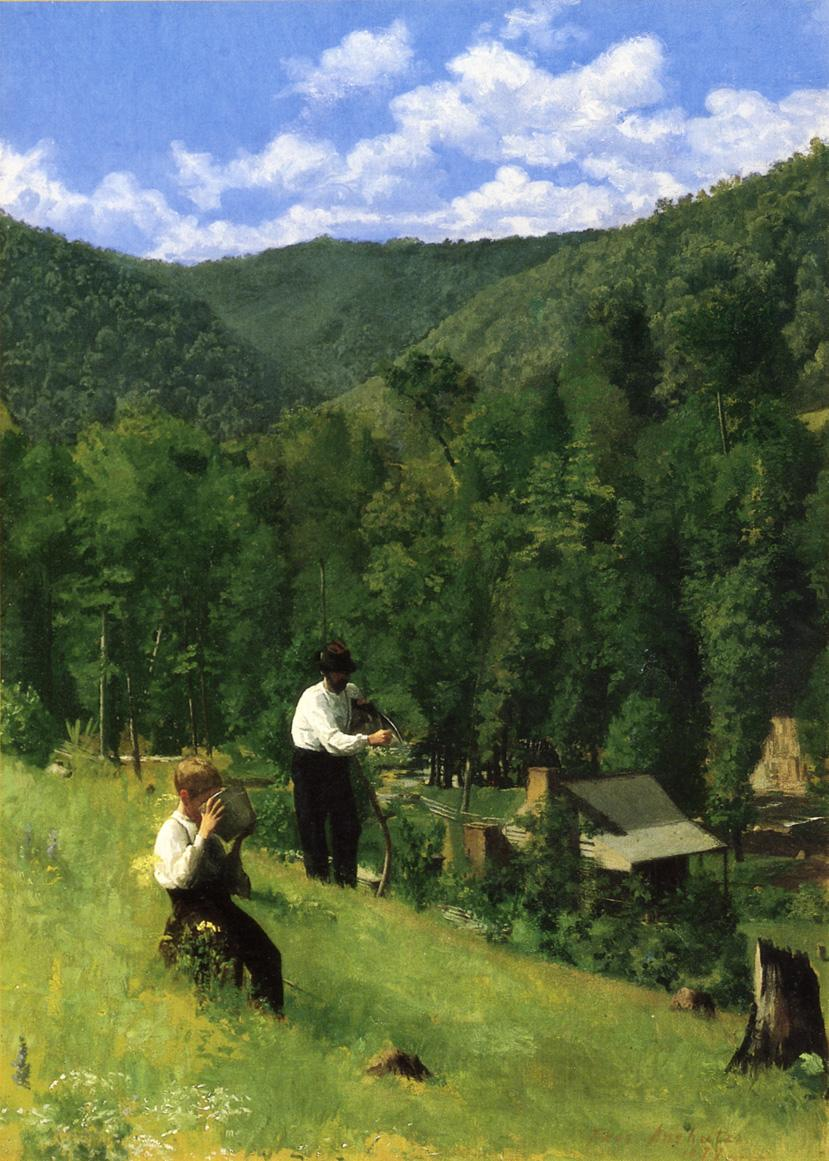
The Farmer and His Son at Harvesting, 1879

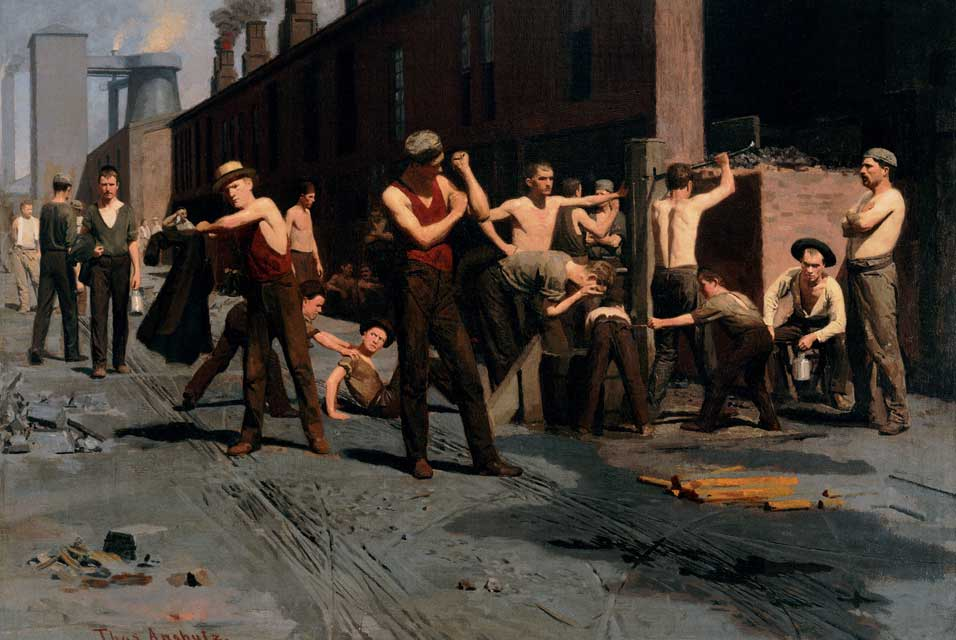
The Ironworkers' Noontime, 1880, Fine Arts Museums of San Francisco

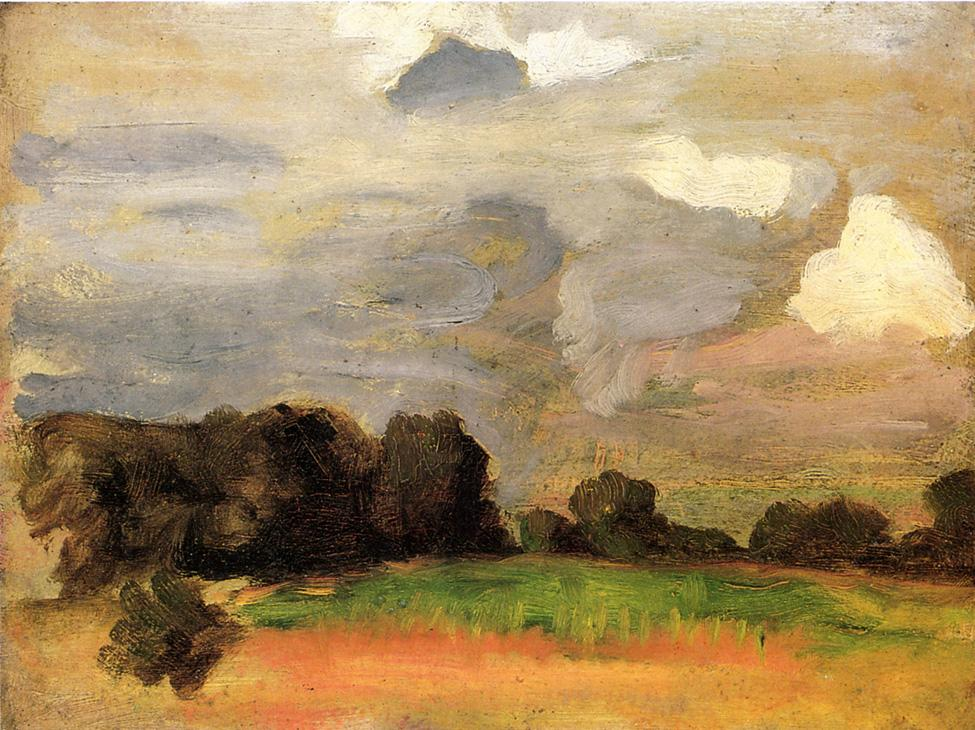
Landscape with grey sky

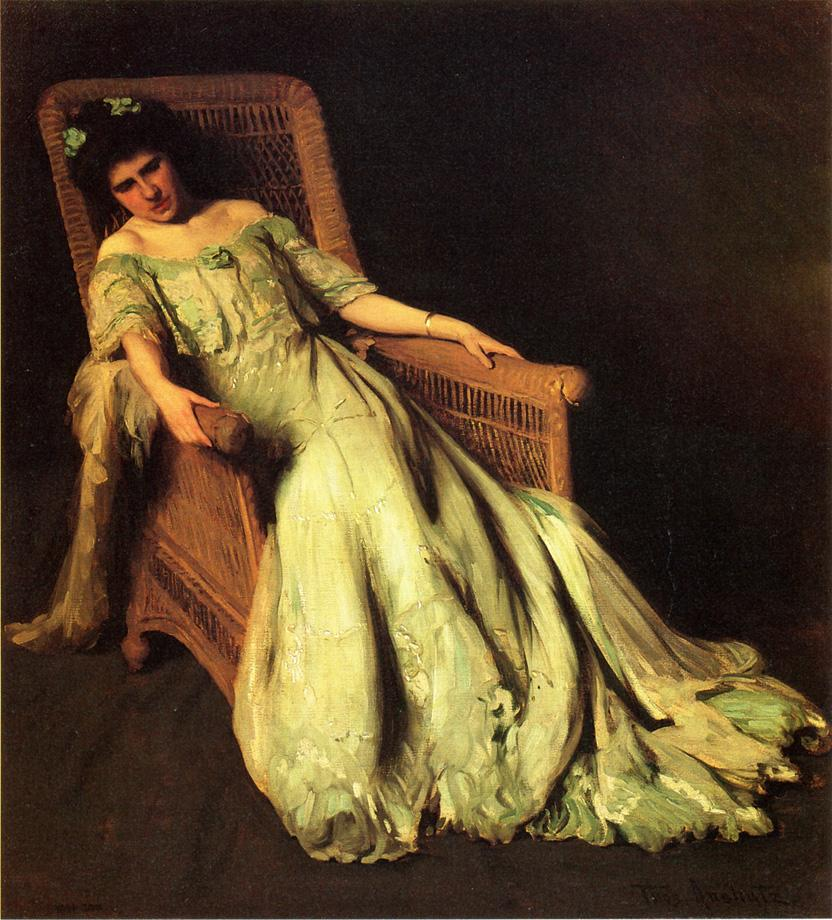
Figurepiece, 1909

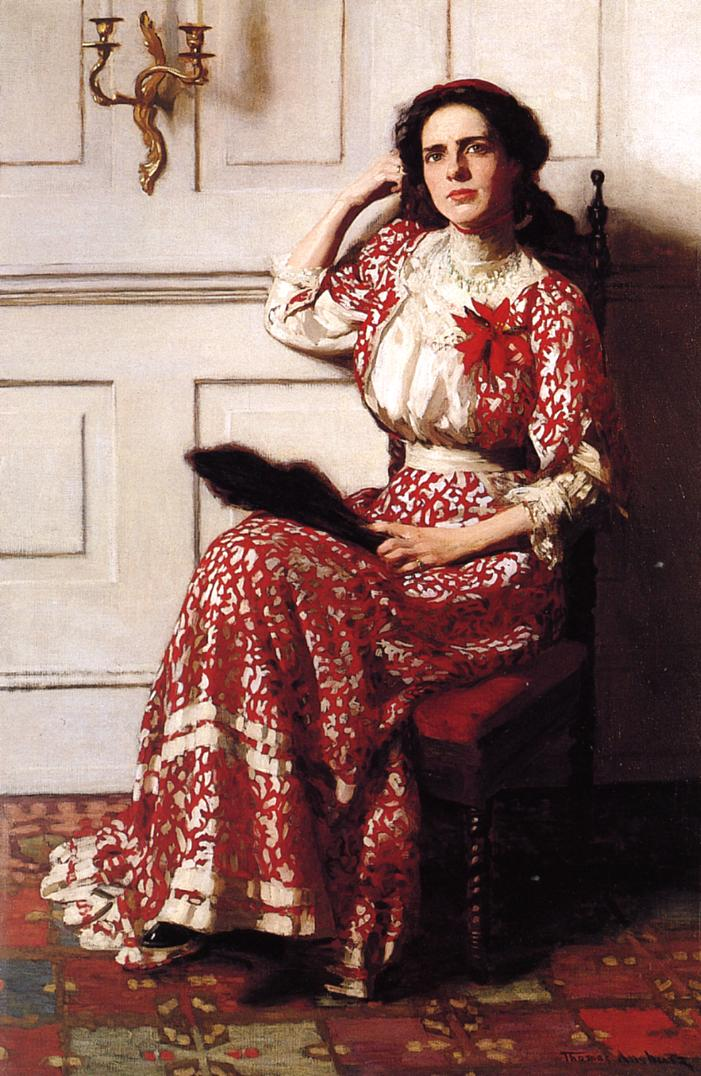
Portrait of Rebecca H. Whelan, c. 1910

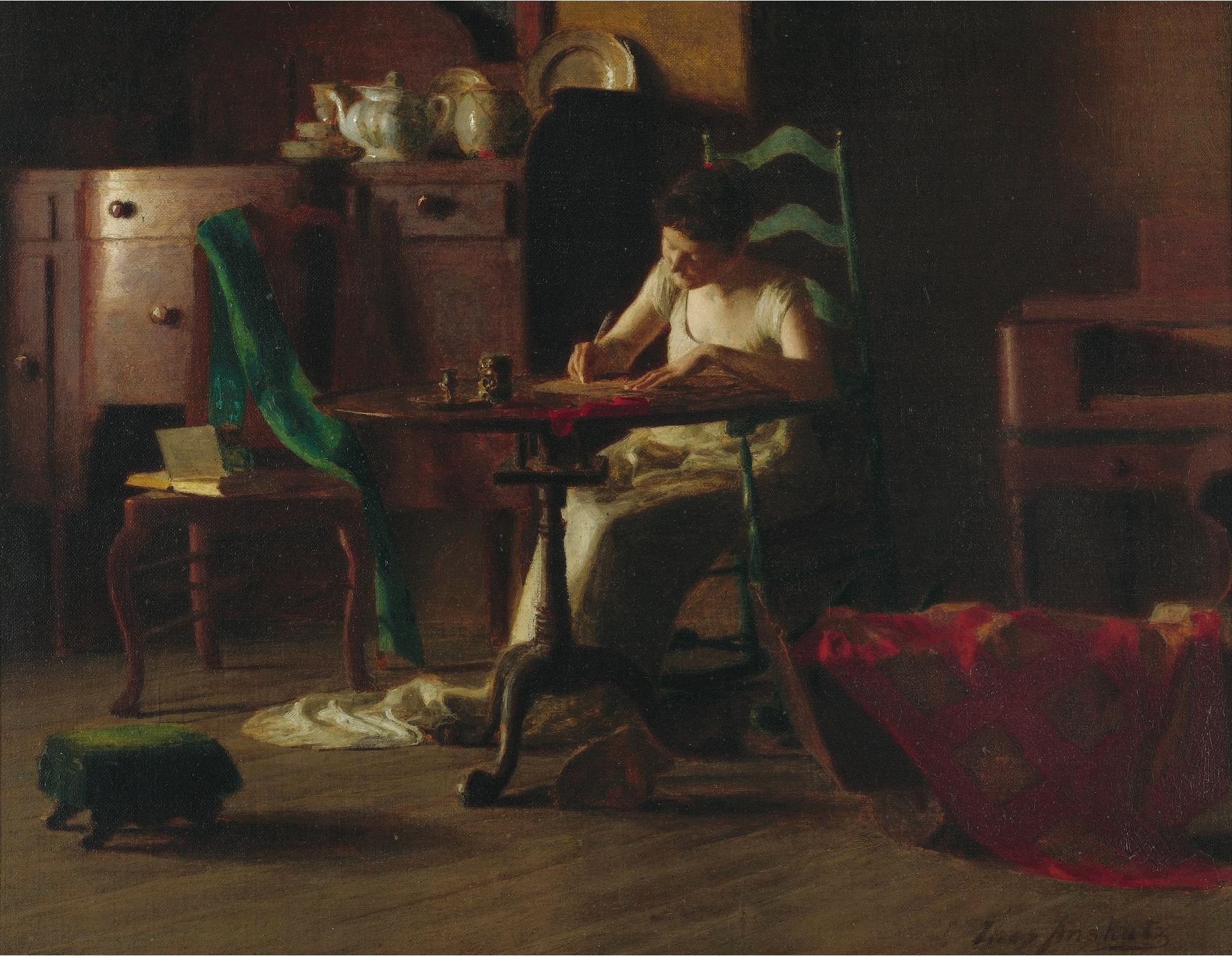
Woman writing on a table, c. 1905

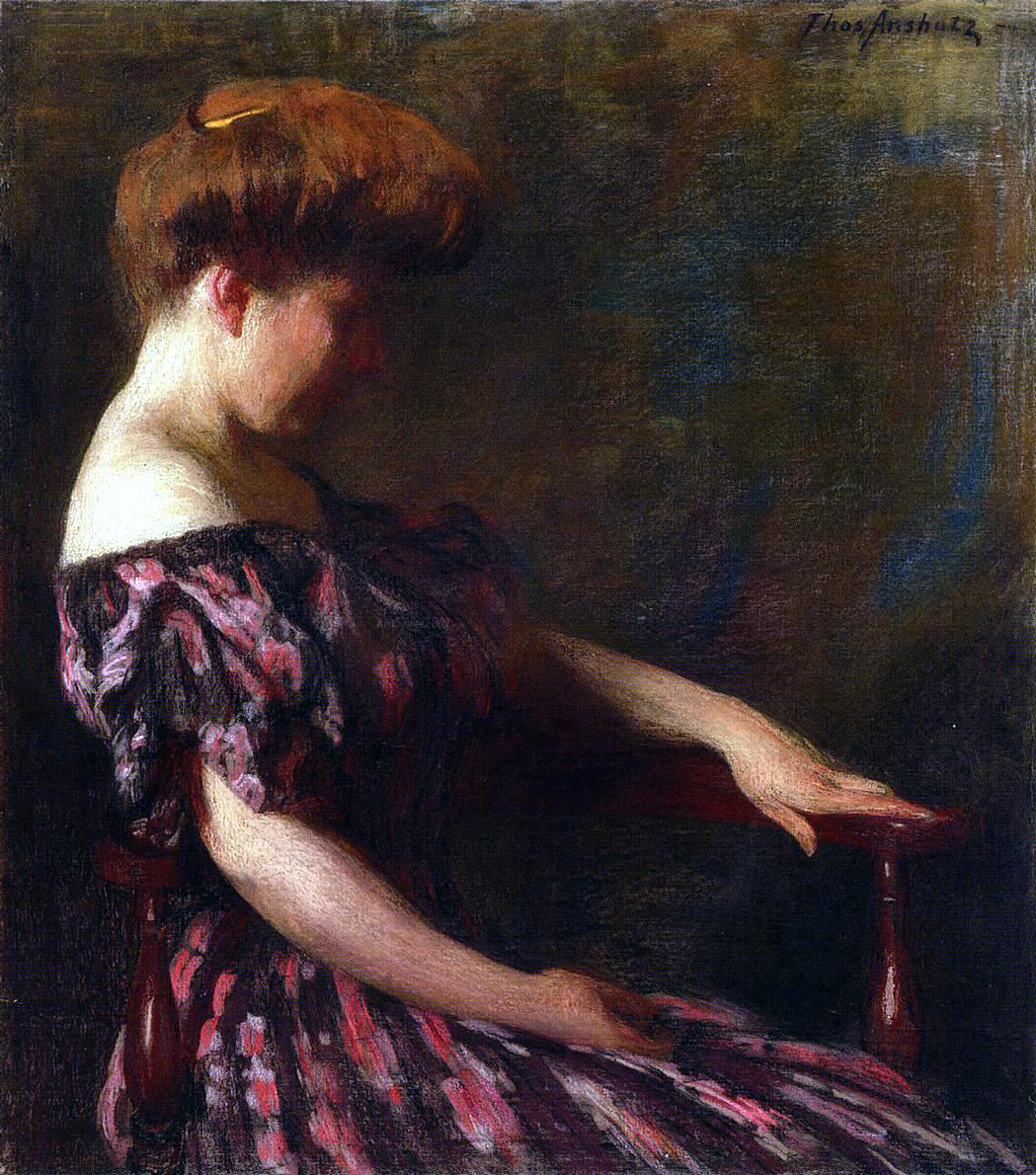
The flowered gown

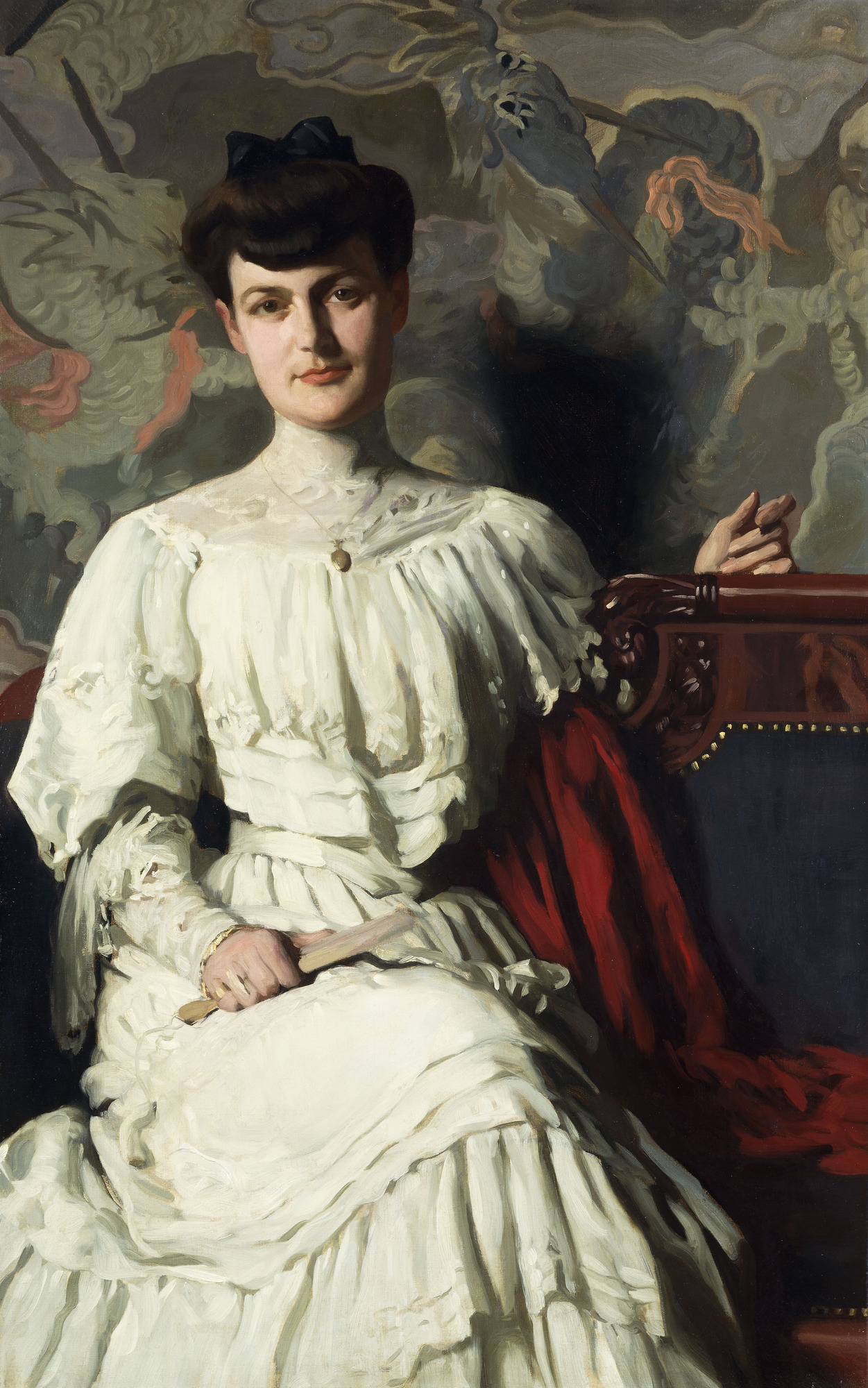
Portrait of Marthe Kientz

== Bibliography ==
- Griffin, Randall C. (2004). Homer, Eakins, & Anshutz: The Search for American Identity in the Gilded Age. University Park: Pennsylvania State University Press. ISBN 0-271-02329-5
- Schwartz, Sanford (1982). The Art Presence. New York: Horizon Press. ISBN 0-8180-0135-6
- Sullivan, Mark. "Pennsylvania Impressionism." Encyclopedia of Greater Philadelphia, online at philadelphiaencyclopedia.org.
- Sullivan, Mark W. "The Darby School of Art: A Forgotten Chapter in the History of American Impressionist and Modern Painting" (Havertown, PA: Brookline Books, 2023)
