= 2009 in art =

The year 2009 in art involved various significant events.

== Events ==
- May 31 – Jaume Plensa's concrete sculpture Dream is unveiled at a former colliery site in Sutton, St Helens, England.
- September 9 – Herning Museum of Contemporary Art, Denmark, new building designed by American architect Steven Holl, opens.
- September 24 – René Magritte's painting Olympia (a nude portrait of his wife) is stolen from the museum at his former home, rue Esseghem 135 in Brussels, by two armed men. The stolen work is said to be worth about $1.1 million.
- October 16 – As part of its celebration of the 100th anniversary of Italian Futurism, the Performa 09 biennial, in collaboration with the Experimental Media and Performing Arts Center (EMPAC) and the San Francisco Museum of Modern Art, premieres a concert at San Francisco Museum of Modern Art whereby it invited Luciano Chessa to direct a reconstruction project to produce accurate replicas of Luigi Russolo's Intonarumori instruments. This project offers the set of 16 original intonarumori (8 noise families of 1–3 instruments each, in various registers) that Russolo built in Milan in the summer of 1913. These intonarumori are physically built by luthier Keith Cary in Winters, California, under Chessa's direction and scientific supervision
- October 29 – The Solomon R. Guggenheim Museum hosts Rob Pruitt's First Annual Art Awards in New York.
- November 14 – Nottingham Contemporary opens as the Centre for Contemporary Art Nottingham, a new gallery in Nottingham, England, designed by Caruso St John.
- December 31 — Edgar Degas's 1877 pastel Les Choristes is stolen from the Musée Cantini in Marseille; it will be found in the luggage compartment of a bus outside Paris in 2018.

== Exhibitions ==
- April 29 until August 2 - "The Pictures Generation", curated by Douglas Eklund, at The Metropolitan Museum of Art, New York City.
- November 13 until February 28, 2010

"Botticelli : likeness, myth, devotion" at the Städel Museum, in Frankfurt am Main, Germany.

== Works ==
- Banksy – Devolved Parliament
- George Condo - Memories of Bozo's Father
- Bruce Conkle – Burls Will Be Burls (sculpture, Portland, Oregon)
- Douglas Coupland – Digital Orca (sculpture, Vancouver, British Columbia)
- Ren Jun – Freezing Water Number 7 (sculpture, Vancouver, British Columbia)
- Michihiro Kosuge – Continuation (sculptures, Portland, Oregon)
- Kurt Laurenz Metzler - Urban People on Orchard Road in Singapore
- Yue Minjun – A-maze-ing Laughter (sculpture, Vancouver, British Columbia)
- Galvarino Ponce Morel – Bust of Bernardo O'Higgins (Washington, D.C.)
- Willy Wang – Statue of Confucius (sculpture, Houston, Texas)
- Patti Warashina – City Reflections (sculpture, Portland, Oregon)
- Statue of Eleftherios Venizelos (sculpture, Washington, D.C.)
- Statue of Lucille Ball (original sculpture, Celoron, New York)

== Awards ==
- The Archibald Prize - Guy Maestri for "Geoffrey Gurrumul Yunupingu"
- The Venice Biennial - (June 7 - November 22)
  - Lion d'or Golden Lion for Lifetime Achievement: Yoko Ono (Japan), John Baldessari (USA)
  - Lion d'or for Best Pavilion: The United States of America exhibiting the work of Bruce Nauman

== Deaths ==
- January 10 – Coosje van Bruggen, 66, wife and collaborator of sculptor Claes Oldenburg
- January 16 – Andrew Wyeth, 91, American painter
- January 27 – Blair Lent, 79, American author and illustrator (b. 1930)
- February 2 – Howard Kanovitz, 79, American painter
- February 3 - Max Neuhaus, 69, American sound installation artist, and composer
- February 23 – Tuulikki Pietilä, 93, Finnish graphic artist
- March 8 – Ernest Trova, 82, American sculptor
- April 21 – Vivian Maier, 83, American street photographer
- April 22 – Jack Cardiff, 94, English cinematographer
- May 31 – Frederick Hammersley, 90, American painter
- June 4 – Robert Colescott, 83, American painter
- June 16 – Frank Herbert Mason, 88, American painter and teacher
- July 13 – Dash Snow, 27, American artist
- July 26 – Merce Cunningham, 90, American dancer, choreographer who worked closely with Robert Rauschenberg and other visual artists.
- July 28 – Tony Rosenthal, 94, American sculptor
- August 26 – Hyman Bloom, 96, American painter
- August 31 – Barry Flanagan, 68, English sculptor
- September 5 – Richard Merkin, 70, American painter, illustrator
- October 1 – Charles Seliger, 83, American painter
- October 11 – Abigail McLellan, 40, Scottish painter
- October 18 – Nancy Spero, 83, American artist
- October 27 – Roy DeCarava, 90, American artist, photographer
- November 11 – Irving Kriesberg, 90, American painter
- November 17 – John Craxton, 87, English painter
- November 18 – Jeanne-Claude, 74, French artist
- November 21 – Kossa Bokchan, 66, Serbian artist
- November 26 – Peter Forakis, 82, American sculptor
- December 1 – Cordelia Oliver, 86, Scottish journalist, painter and art critic
- December 10 – Thomas Hoving, 78, former director of the Metropolitan Museum of Art
- December 21 – Craigie Aitchison, 83, Scottish painter
- Undated – Olja Ivanjicki, Serbian painter (b. 1931)
