= Richard Rhodes (disambiguation) =

Richard Rhodes may refer to:

- Richard Rhodes (born 1937), American journalist and historian
- Richard Rhodes (sculptor) (born 1961), American sculptor
- Richard Rhodes (police commissioner) (born 1942), British politician
- Richard Rhodes (poet) (died 1668), English poet
- Richard Rhodes Bristow (1838–1934), English clergyman

== See also ==
- Richard V. Rhode (1904–1994), American aeronautical engineer
- Richard Alan Rhoden (born 1953), American sportsman
