= Freezing Water Number 7 =

Sculpture by Res Jun

Freezing Water #7
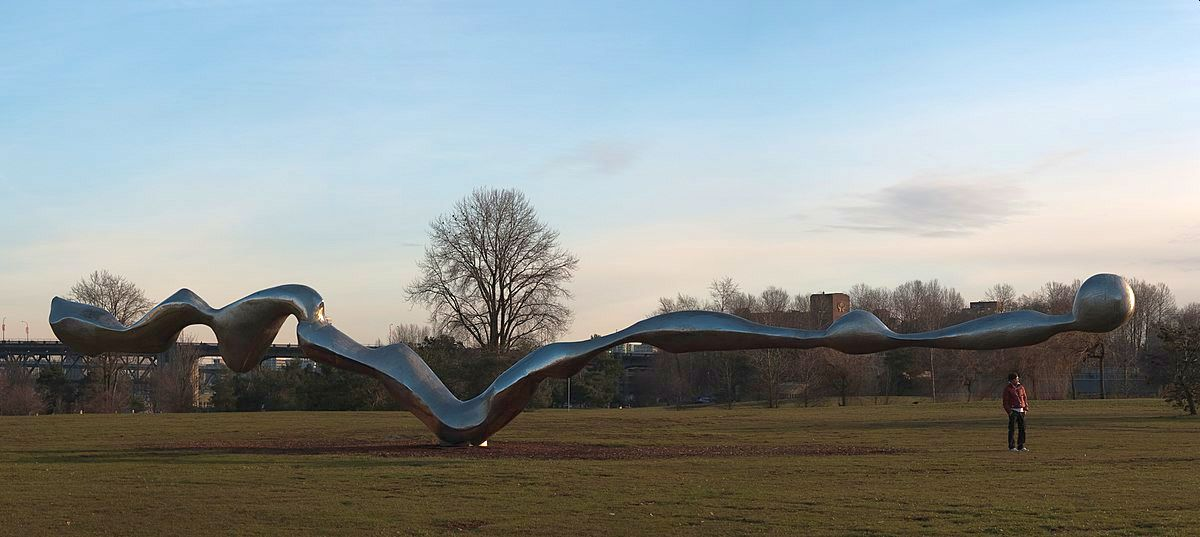
- The sculpture at Vanier Park in February 2011
- Artist: Ren Jun
- Year: 2009
- Type: Sculpture
- Medium: Stainless steel
- Dimensions: 9.1 m (30 ft)
- Location: Vancouver, British Columbia

Freezing Water Number 7 (stylized as Freezing Water #7) was a stainless steel sculpture by Chinese artist Ren Jun. It was erected in Vancouver, British Columbia's Vanier Park in 2009, just prior to the 2010 Winter Olympics, for the 2009–2011 Vancouver Biennale. The installation marked Jun's North American debut.

In April 2011, The Georgia Straight reported that Freezing Water #7 was being re-installed in Richmond, British Columbia. A formal request was filed to extend the sculpture's temporary display in Vancouver for the 2014 Vancouver International Sculpture Biennale, along with two other works. Due to major erosion, the sculpture was disassembled in September 2014. The sculpture was more than 30 metres (98 ft) long and weighed over 6,000 kilograms (13,000 lb).

The sculpture is said to have a "vertical twin", Water #10, which is installed in Richmond.

== See also ==
- 2009 in art
