= Tacoma Art Museum =

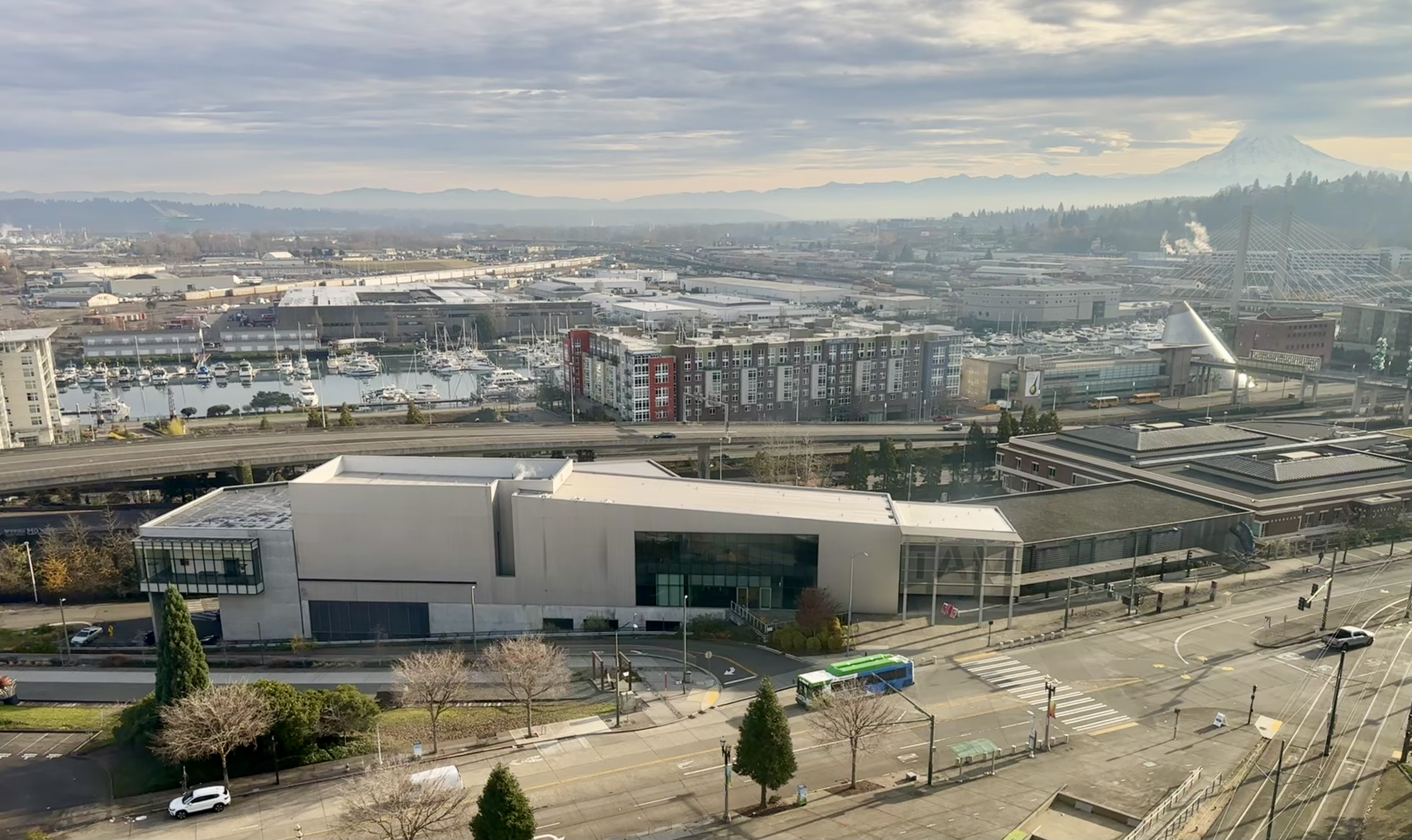
- Established: 1935
- Location: 1701 Pacific Avenue; Tacoma, Washington; 98402
- Coordinates: 47.2475°N 122.4368°W
- Type: Art museum
- Curator: Jessica Wilks
- Architect: Antoine Predock
- Public transit access: Union Station/South 19th Street station
- Website: tacomaartmuseum.org

The Tacoma Art Museum (TAM) is an art museum in Tacoma, Washington, United States. It focuses primarily on the art and artists from the Pacific Northwest and broader western region of the U.S. Founded in 1935, the museum has strong roots in the community and anchors the university and museum district in downtown Tacoma.

== History ==
The Tacoma Art Museum developed out of the Tacoma Art League, an informal gathering that began around 1891. In the 1930s, it was renamed the Tacoma Art Society, before finally becoming the Tacoma Art Museum in 1964. The museum is dedicated to collecting and exhibiting the visual arts of the American Northwest, with the mission of bringing people together through art. The museum's permanent collection includes the premier collection of Tacoma native Dale Chihuly’s glass artwork, on permanent public display.

In 1971, the L. T. Murray family (owners of the Murray Pacific Northwest timber company) gave the Tacoma Art Museum a three-story building at 12th Street and Pacific Avenue. Built in 1922, the building at 1123 Pacific Avenue previously housed the National Bank of Tacoma.

In May 2003, the Tacoma Art Museum moved into a 50,000 square foot (4,650 m^{2}) building located at 1701 Pacific Avenue, which was designed by Antoine Predock. The $22 million steel and glass structure nearly doubled the available space, allowing the museum to exhibit more of its permanent collection. In designing the building, Predock drew inspiration from the region's light and its relationship to the water, Mount Rainier, the Thea Foss Waterway, and the neighborhood's industrial history and character in what is now known as the Tacoma Museum District.

A $15.5 million building project expansion designed by Olson Kundig Architects was completed in November 2014. The expansion, which houses the Haub Family Collection of Western American Art, added approximately 16,000 square feet (1500 m^{2}) to the museum.

TAM's current Executive Director is Andy Maus who began in 2023 one month before the museum board voluntarily recognized the employee organized union after heavy controversy.

== Curatorial information ==
The museum exhibits more than 5,400 pieces in its collection, two-thirds of which are classified as Northwest art. Since 1934, Tacoma Art Museum has built a permanent collection that includes work from artists such as Mary Cassatt, Jean-Baptiste-Camille Corot, Edgar Degas, Robert Henri, Edward Hopper, Robert Rauschenberg, Pierre-Auguste Renoir, Jacob Lawrence, John Singer Sargent, and Andrew Wyeth.

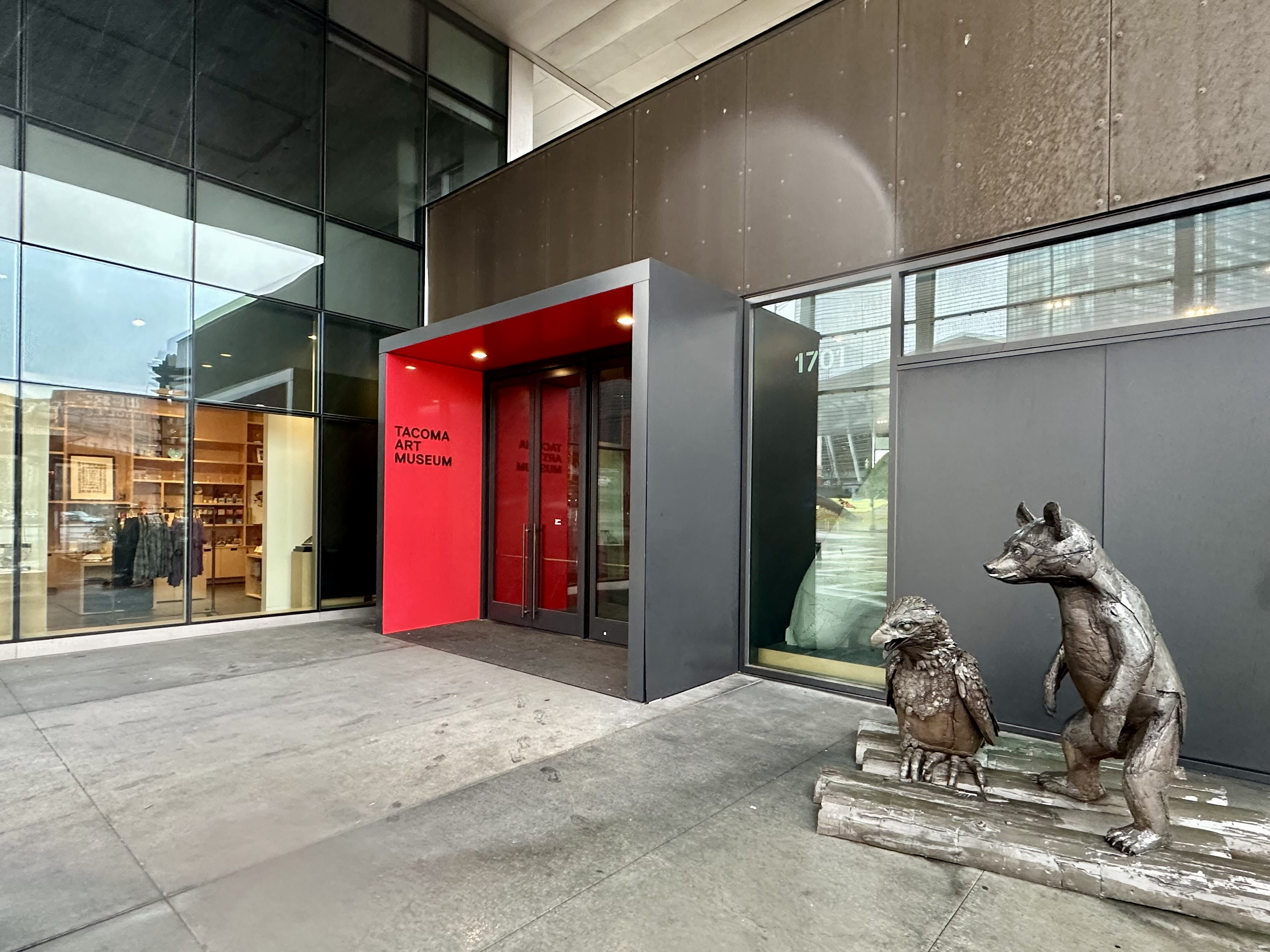
Tacoma Art Museum front entrance

Nearly seventy percent of the collection consists of works from Northwest artists such as Guy Anderson, Morris Graves, Jacob Lawrence, Jared Pappas-Kelley, Akio Takamori, Mark Tobey, and Patti Warashina. Untitled - Stone Wave, a major work by Seattle-based sculptor Richard Rhodes, occupies the central court of the museum.

The museum is known as being more open to overtly gay or queer art than most American museums. In 2012, it presented the Hide/Seek show that was censored at the National Portrait Gallery; TAM intended to present the show uncensored. The museum also planned to follow with another show curated by Jonathan Katz: Art, AIDS, America.

== Exhibitions ==
=== Permanent collections ===
- The Christopher and Alida Latham Display
- Dale Chihuly at Tacoma Art Museum
- Metaphor into Form: Art in the Era of the Pilchuck Glass School
- Martin Blank's Current
- Richard Rhodes' Untitled
- Outdoor Sculptures at TAM

=== Current exhibitions ===
- Exhibitions On View - Tacoma Art Museum
