= José Martí (disambiguation) =

José Martí (1853–1895) was a Cuban poet, writer and leader of the Cuban independence movement. The name may also refer to:

- Juan José Martí (1570?-1604), Spanish novelist
- José Martí y Monsó (1840-1912), Spanish painter
- José Luis Martí (born 1975), Spanish footballer
- Josep Maria "Pepe" Martí (born 2005), Spanish racing driver
- Bust of José Martí, a sculpture in Houston, Texas, United States
- José Martí International Airport, a Cuban airport
