= José Rizal (disambiguation) =

José Rizal (1861–1896) is a national hero of the Philippines.

José Rizal or Jose Rizal may also refer to:

- José Rizal University, a private university in the Philippines
- Jose Rizal Heavy Bombers, the varsity team of Jose Rizal University
- José Rizal (film), a 1998 biographical film on the life of José Rizal
- Jose Rizal Memorial State University, a public university in the Philippines
- Bust of José Rizal, a sculpture by Lorena Toritch
