= McGovern Centennial Gardens =

Sculpture garden in Houston, Texas, US

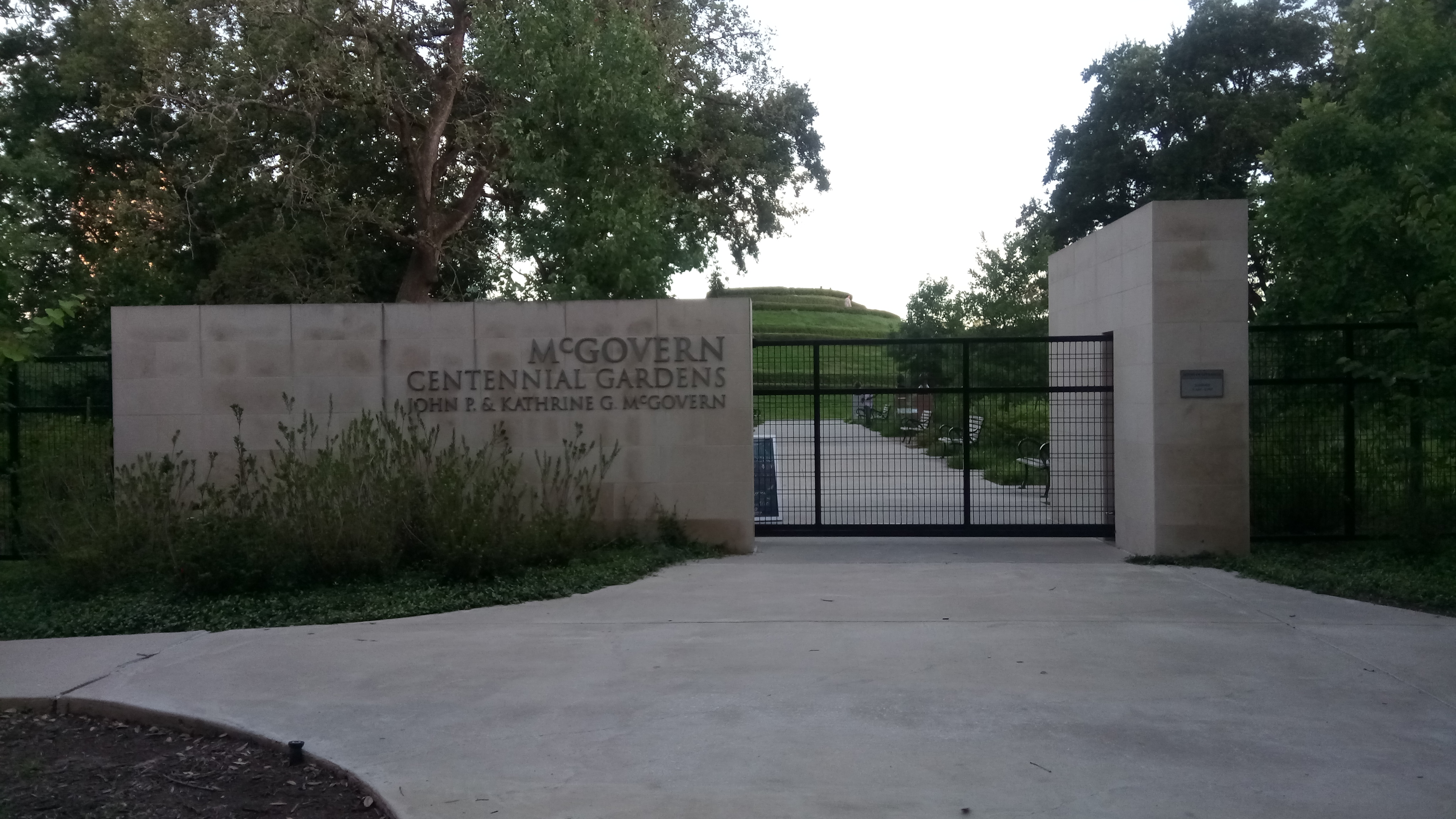
- Entrance signage

- Location within Texas
- Type: Gardens
- Location: Houston, TX
- Coordinates: 29.721°N 95.387°W
- Created: 2014
- Operator: Hermann Park Conservancy
- Status: Open year-round, except Thanksgiving and Christmas Day
- Plants: 650 azaleas, 490 trees of over 50 species, 55,000 perennial bulbs, 760 hedge shrubs & 4.5-acre (1.8 ha) of grass
- Collections: 'Earth-Kind' designated antique roses
- Parking: Street or HMNS's parking garage
- Website: McGovern Centennial Gardens

McGovern Centennial Gardens is a collection of gardens in Hermann Park, in Houston, Texas, United States.

== Description and history ==
The 15-acre (6.1 ha) park cost $31 million and took approximately eight years to complete, officially opening in December 2014. The gardens consist of the Arid Garden, the Celebration Garden, the Family Garden, the Rose Garden and the Woodland Garden.

The park includes a 30-foot (9.1 m) Garden Mount.

=== Public art ===
The Hawkins Sculpture Walk features sculptures of notable figures, including busts of Simón Bolívar (1977), Robert Burns (2002), Álvar Núñez Cabeza de Vaca, Ramón Castilla, José Martí, Bernardo O'Higgins (1992), José Rizal (2006), Vicente Rocafuerte, Benito Juárez, and José de San Martín (1983)

McGovern also features Dawn (1971), which was previously installed inside the entrance to the Houston Garden Center, as well as statues of Confucius, Mahatma Gandhi (2004), and Martin Luther King Jr. (2007).

== Gallery ==
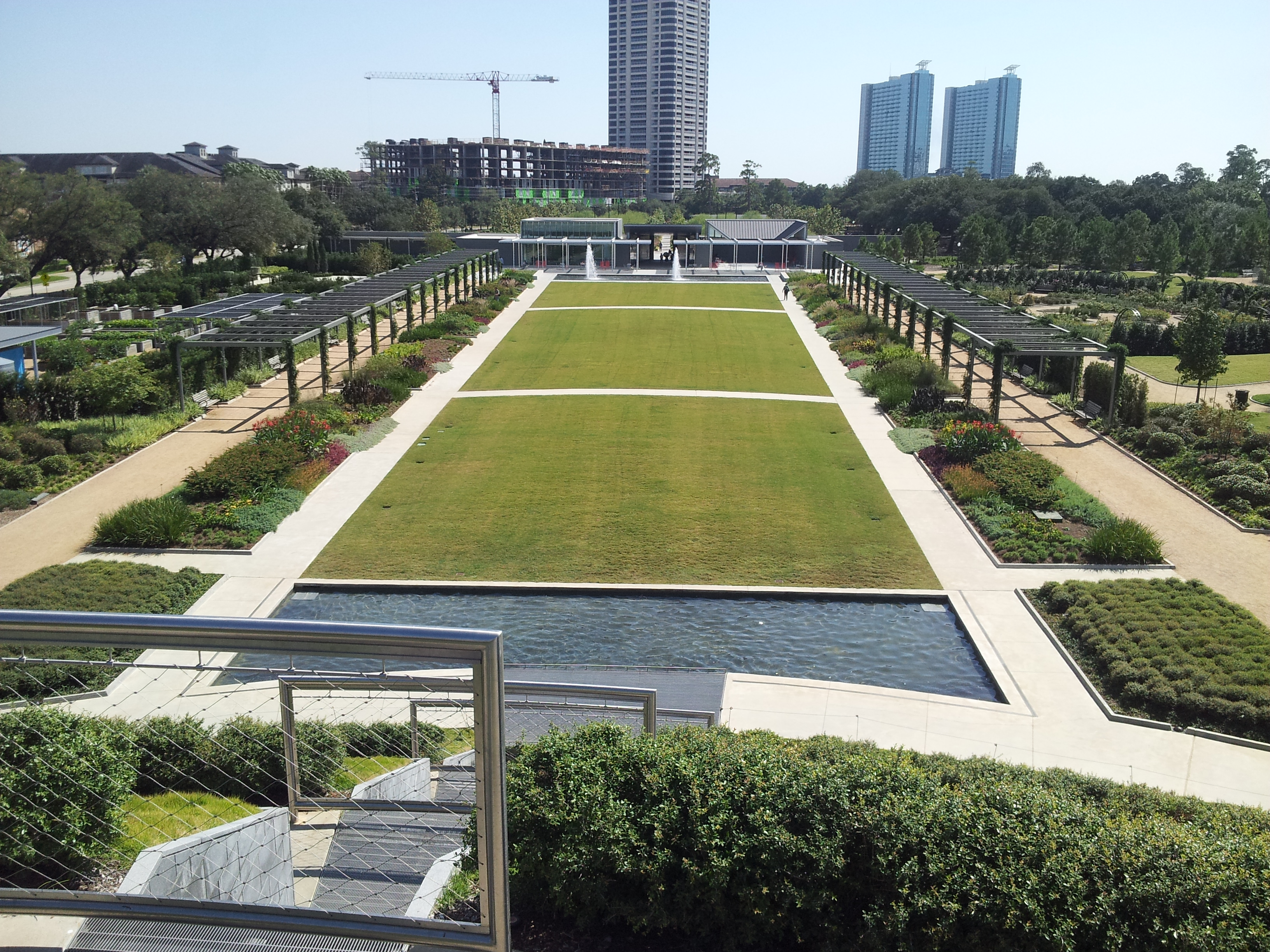
The gardens

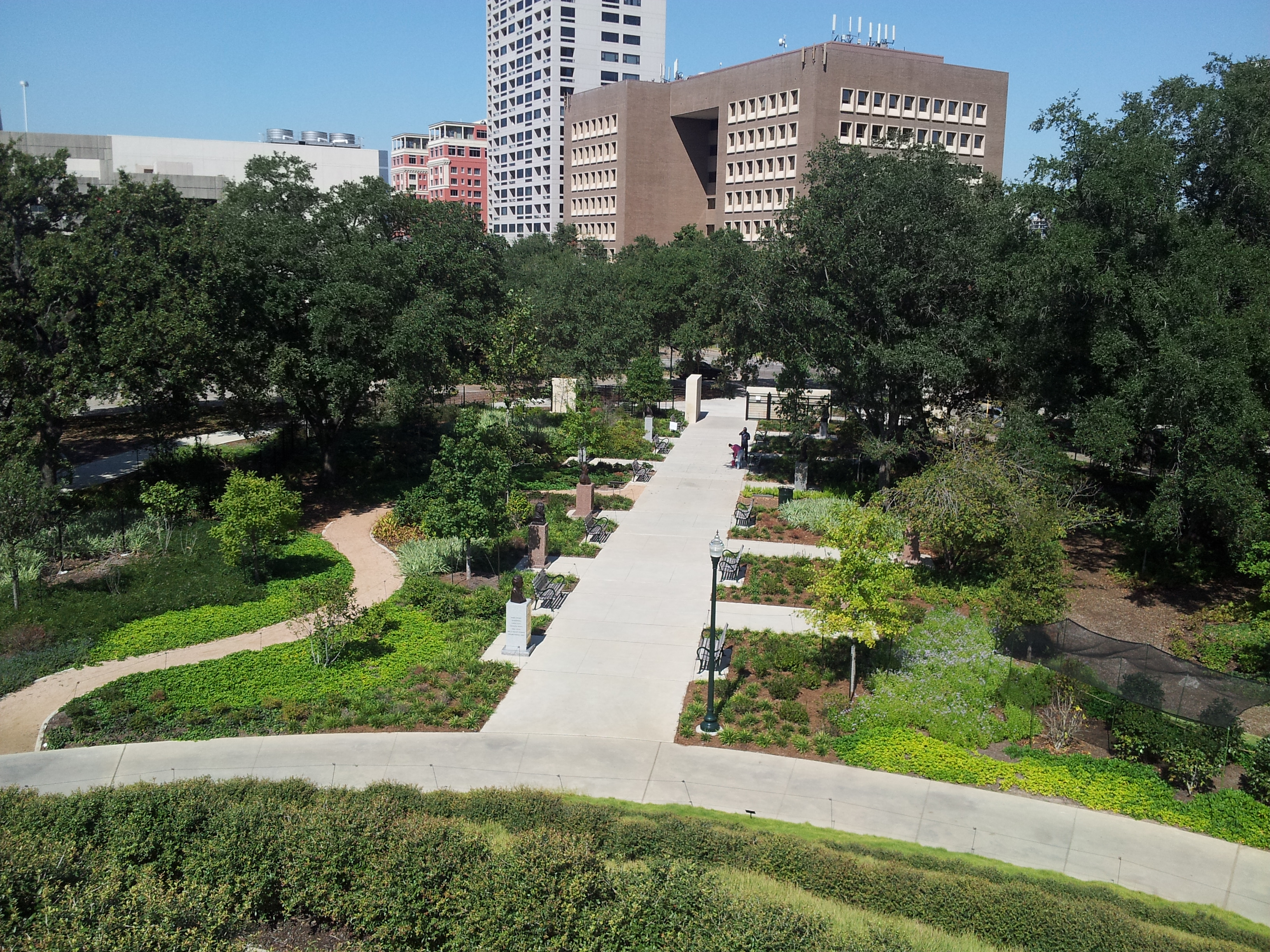
Hawkins Sculpture Walk

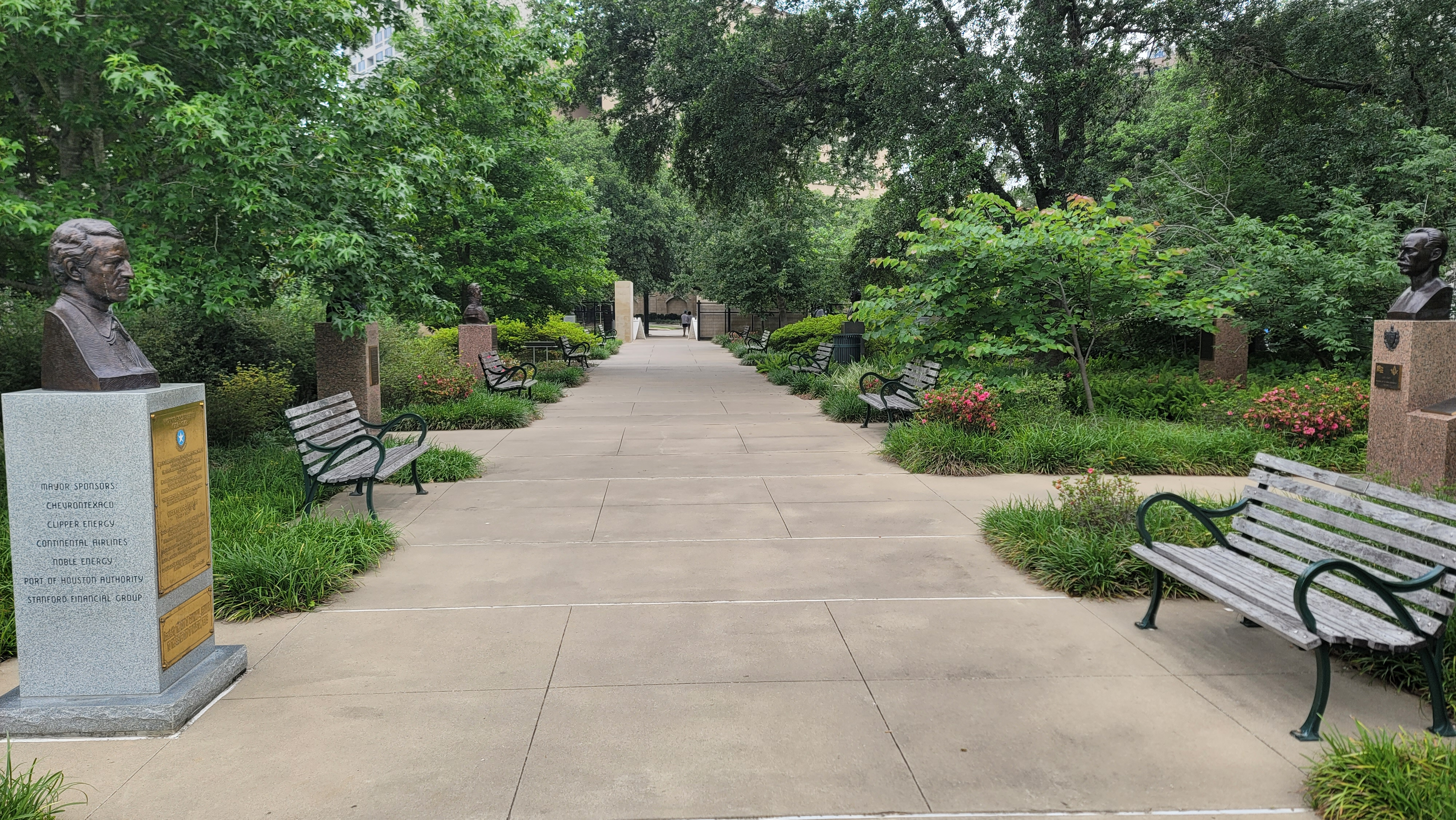
Hawkins Sculpture Walk, looking north

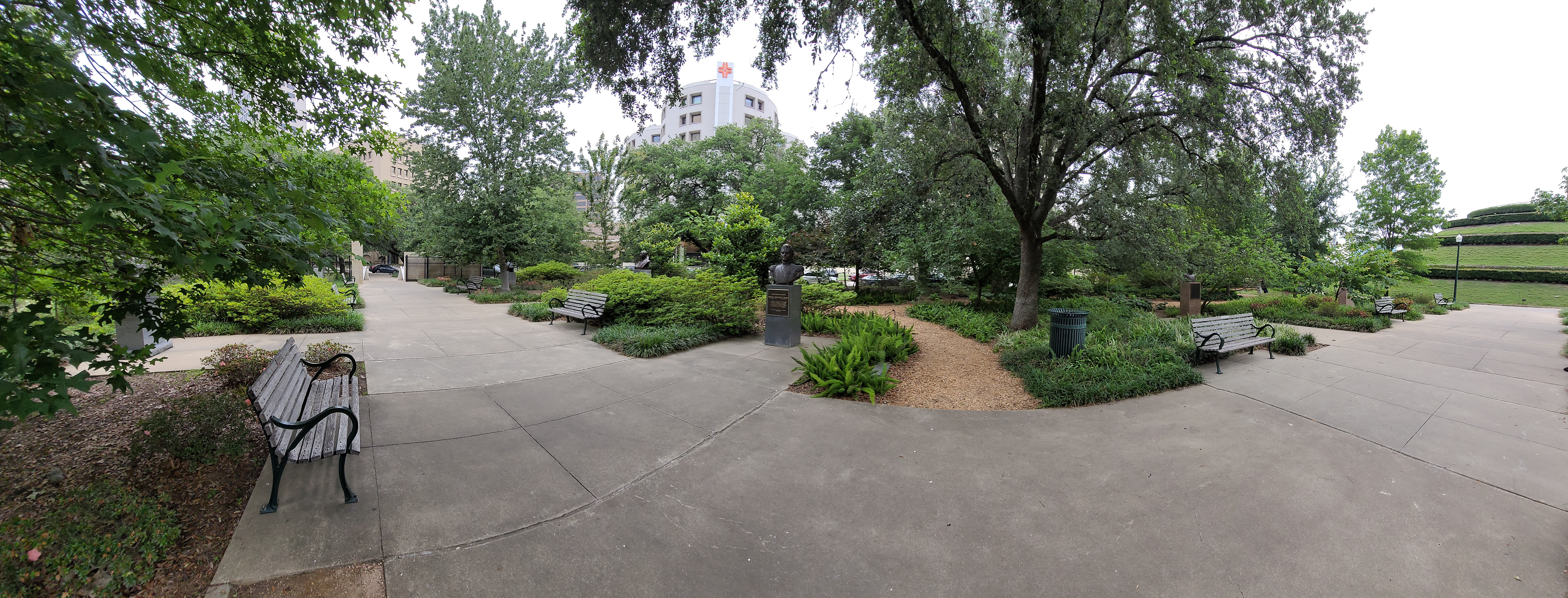
Hawkins Sculpture Walk panorama

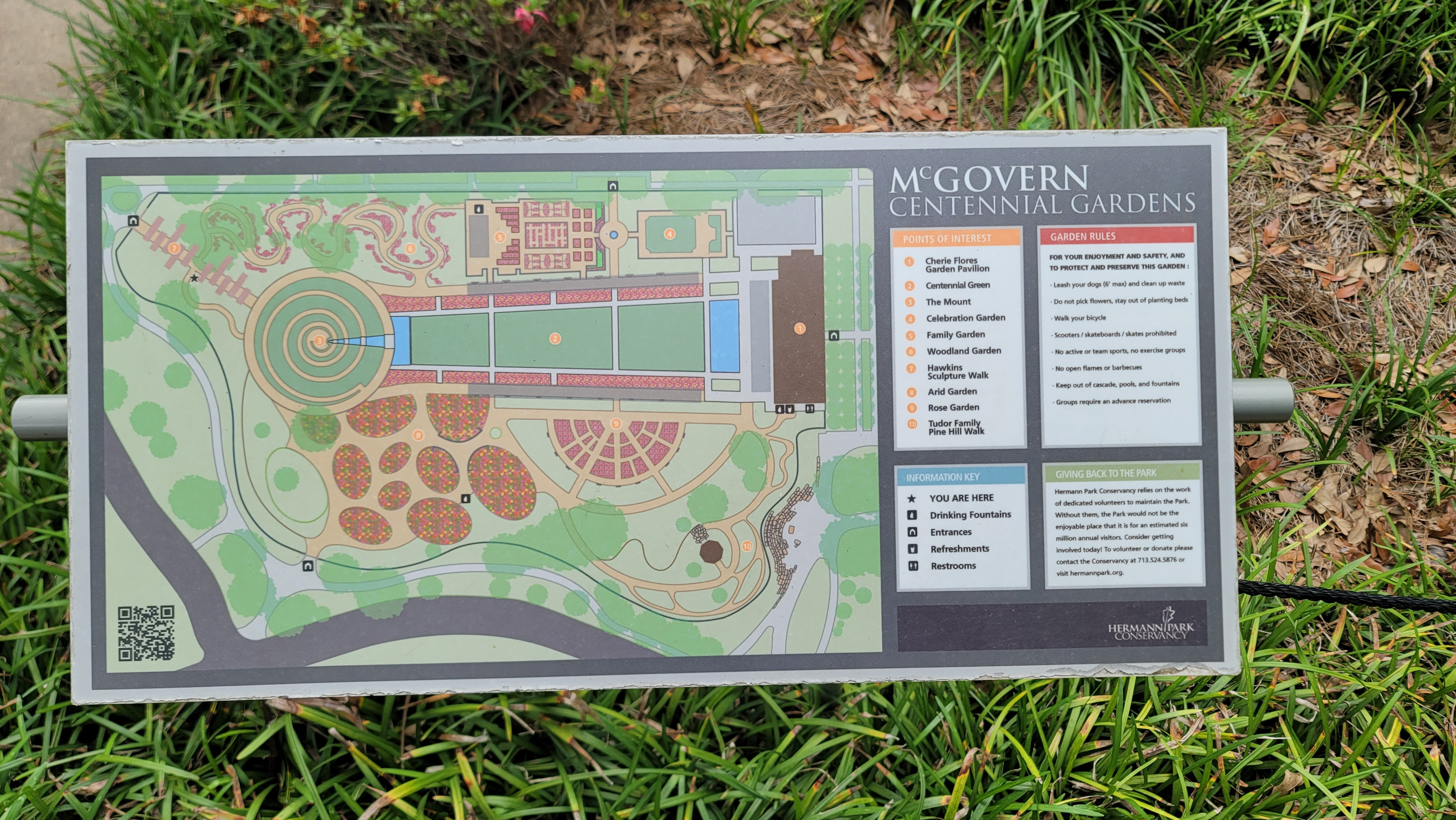
McGovern Gardens map

== See also ==
- Lillie and Hugh Roy Cullen Sculpture Garden, Houston
- List of public art in Houston
