= Burls Will Be Burls =

Sculpture in Portland, Oregon, U.S.

- Two of the installation's pieces in 2015
- Artist: Bruce Conkle
- Year: 2009
- Type: Sculpture
- Medium: Bronze, cast concrete
- Location: Portland, Oregon, United States; 45°31′22.2″N 122°40′35.9″W
- Owner: City of Portland and Multnomah County Public Art Collection courtesy of the Regional Arts & Culture Council
- Website: www.bruceconkle.com/burls/burlshome.htm

Burls Will Be Burls is an outdoor 2009 bronze sculpture by American artist Bruce Conkle, located in Portland, Oregon.

== Description and history ==
Burls Will Be Burls was designed by Bruce Conkle and completed in 2009 as a tribute to snowmen and to the forests of the Pacific Northwest. It is installed at the intersection of Southwest 6th Avenue and West Burnside. The art installation consists of three cast bronze figures representing "what might happen when a snowman melts and nourishes a nearby living tree", as "water is absorbed by the roots and carries the spirit of the melted snowman up into the tree where it manifests itself as burls".

The three snowmen measure 71 inches (180 cm) x 16 inches (41 cm) x 17 inches (43 cm), 98 inches (250 cm) x 12 inches (30 cm) x 12 inches (30 cm), and 72 inches (180 cm) x 17 inches (43 cm) x 19 inches (48 cm), respectively. The work is part of the City of Portland and Multnomah County Public Art Collection courtesy of the Regional Arts & Culture Council. It has been included in at least one published walking tour of Portland.

Detail of a snowman

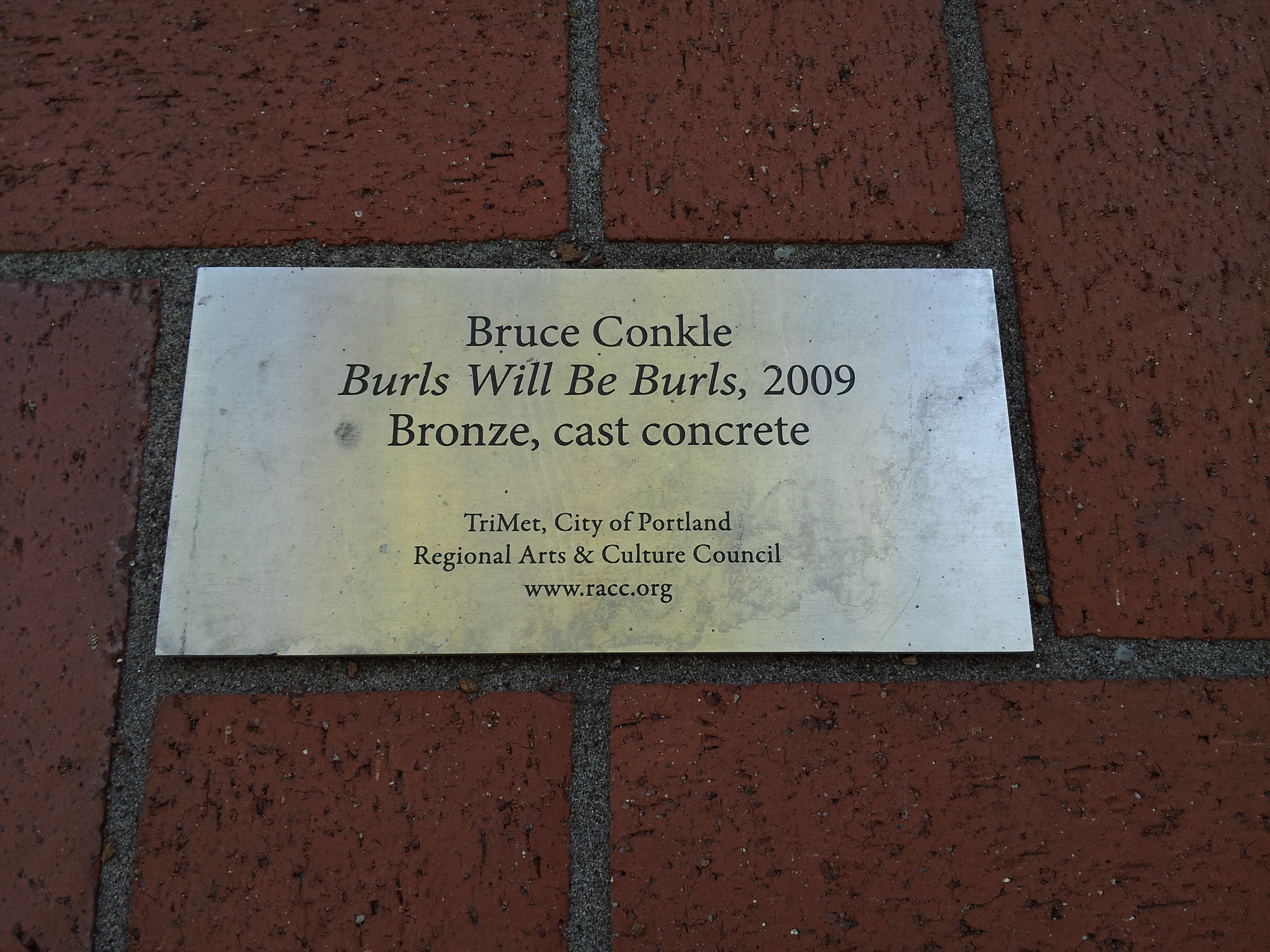
Plaque for the sculpture

== See also ==
- 2009 in art
