= Statue of Mahatma Gandhi (Houston) =

Sculpture in Hermann Park, Houston, Texas, U.S.

Mahatma Gandhi
- Year: 2004
- Type: Sculpture
- Subject: Mahatma Gandhi
- Location: Houston, Texas, United States; 29.721156°N 95.388357°W

Mahatma Gandhi is an outdoor sculpture of the Indian independence movement leader of the same name, installed at Hermann Park's McGovern Centennial Gardens in Houston, Texas, in the United States. The statue was dedicated in Hermann Park on October 2, 2004.

== See also ==
- 2004 in art
- List of artistic depictions of Mahatma Gandhi
- List of public art in Houston
