= Dawn (Journeay) =

1931 bronze sculpture by Helen Journeay

- Cast of Dawn in Houston, Texas, U.S.
- Artist: Helen Journeay
- Year: 1931
- Type: Sculptural Group
- Medium: Bronze
- Subject: Woman and fawn
- Dimensions: 95.3 cm (37.52 in)
- Location: Brookgreen Gardens; Murrells Inlet, South Carolina, U.S.; 33.519718°N 79.097471°W
- Accession: S.1932.029

Dawn is a 1931 bronze sculptural group by Helen Journeay. It depicts a nude woman in a contrapposto pose with her right elbow raised and right hand behind her head. With her left hand, she caresses the head of a fawn standing behind her.

There are two versions of this work. The woman in the original is depicted entirely nude. In the second version, she is partially covered by a diaphanous veil draped over her right shoulder and falling over her right breast and belly. A cast of the original currently stands in Hermann Park's McGovern Centennial Gardens in Houston, Texas, and a cast of the modified version can be found in Brookgreen Gardens, a sculpture garden in South Carolina.

== History ==
In 1931, the draped second version was exhibited at the Pennsylvania Academy of the Fine Arts in Philadelphia. Several stories recount why the artist modified the sculpture to include the draped veil. Art historian and curator Robin Salmon wrote that the sculptor and collector Anna Hyatt Huntington viewed photographs of the work in its initial form and suggested to Journeay that the sculpture would be improved by adding a drapery. In a Washington Post article from 1935, Journeay humorously recounted that a "righteous Southern gentleman" (presumably Archer Milton Huntington, the husband of Anna), after viewing the original sculpture standing in the store window of Gorham Manufacturing Company in New York, had timidly suggested that if a veil were added to the work, he would purchase it. Officials from Gorham contacted the artist who quickly added a veil to the model so that it could be recast in bronze at the Gorham Foundry. Both stories conclude with the Huntingtons purchasing the veiled work for Brookgreen Gardens, a sculpture garden they had founded to feature sculptures by Anna and other American artists.

== See also ==
- 1931 in art
- List of public art in Houston
