= Stone Wave =

Sculpture in Tacoma, Washington

Coordinates: 47°14′52″N 122°26′11″W

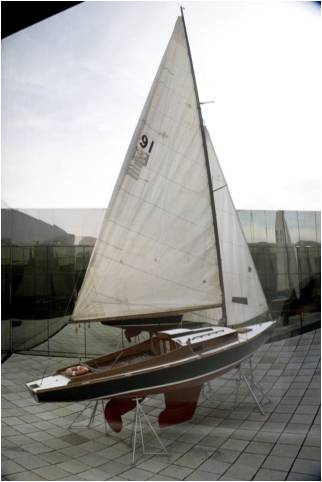
Sailboat installed on Richard Rhodes' Stone Wave.

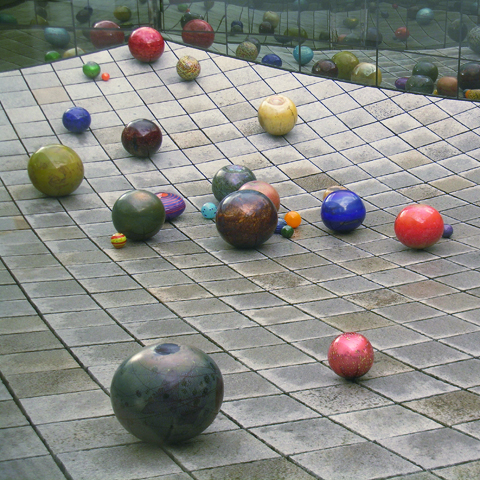
Richard Rhodes' Stone Wave at the Tacoma Art Museum featuring glass work by Dale Chihuly

Stone Wave occupies the central courtyard of Tacoma, Washington's Tacoma Art Museum and is a major public work by sculptor Richard Rhodes of Seattle, Washington. Completed in May, 2003, the wave is constructed using 650 unique pieces of antique Chinese granite laid on a substrate of closed-cell foam and mortar. At once echoing the surging of waves and the volcanic core of Mount Rainier, the sculpture presents a zone of visual serenity among the museum's galleries.
