= Bust of Vicente Rocafuerte =

Sculpture in Houston, Texas, U.S.

- Artist: Amadeus Palacio Collmann
- Type: Sculpture
- Medium: Bronze
- Subject: Vicente Rocafuerte
- Location: Houston, Texas, United States; 29°43′18.5″N 95°23′17.2″W

An outdoor bronze bust of Vicente Rocafuerte by Amadeus Palacio Collmann is installed at Hermann Park's McGovern Centennial Gardens in Houston, Texas, in the United States.

== See also ==
- List of public art in Houston
