= Statue of Confucius (Houston) =

2009 sculpture in Houston, Texas, U.S.

Confucius
- Year: 2009
- Type: Sculpture
- Medium: Bronze
- Subject: Confucius
- Location: Houston, Texas, United States; 29°43′13.9″N 95°23′13.5″W

Confucius, also known as Bronze Statue of Confucius, Confucius Bronze Statue, Confucius Statue, and Great Confucius, is an outdoor 2009 bronze sculpture of the Chinese editor, philosopher, politician, and teacher of the same name by Willy Wang (Chinese: 王维力), installed in Hermann Park's McGovern Centennial Gardens in Houston, Texas, United States.

== History ==
The statue was dedicated at Hermann Park as a gift from China to Houston on September 26, 2009, commemorating the 2,560th anniversary of the Confucius' birth and the 30th anniversary of the establishment of diplomatic relations between China and the United States. Ceremony attendees included Houston City Councilwoman Wanda Adams, Minister Liu Guangyuan of the Embassy of China to the United States, Mayor Pro Tem of Houston Sue Lovell, Wang, First Lady of Houston Andrea White, Consul General to Houston Gao Yanping, and representatives from Friends of Confucius Sculpture for Hermann Park and Houston Parks and Recreation. Nearly 600 people from the Chinese Consulate General in Houston, the city government, consular corps, and Chinese community were also in attendance.

== See also ==
- 2009 in art
- List of public art in Houston
