= Bust of José de San Martín (Houston) =

Sculpture in Houston, Texas, U.S.

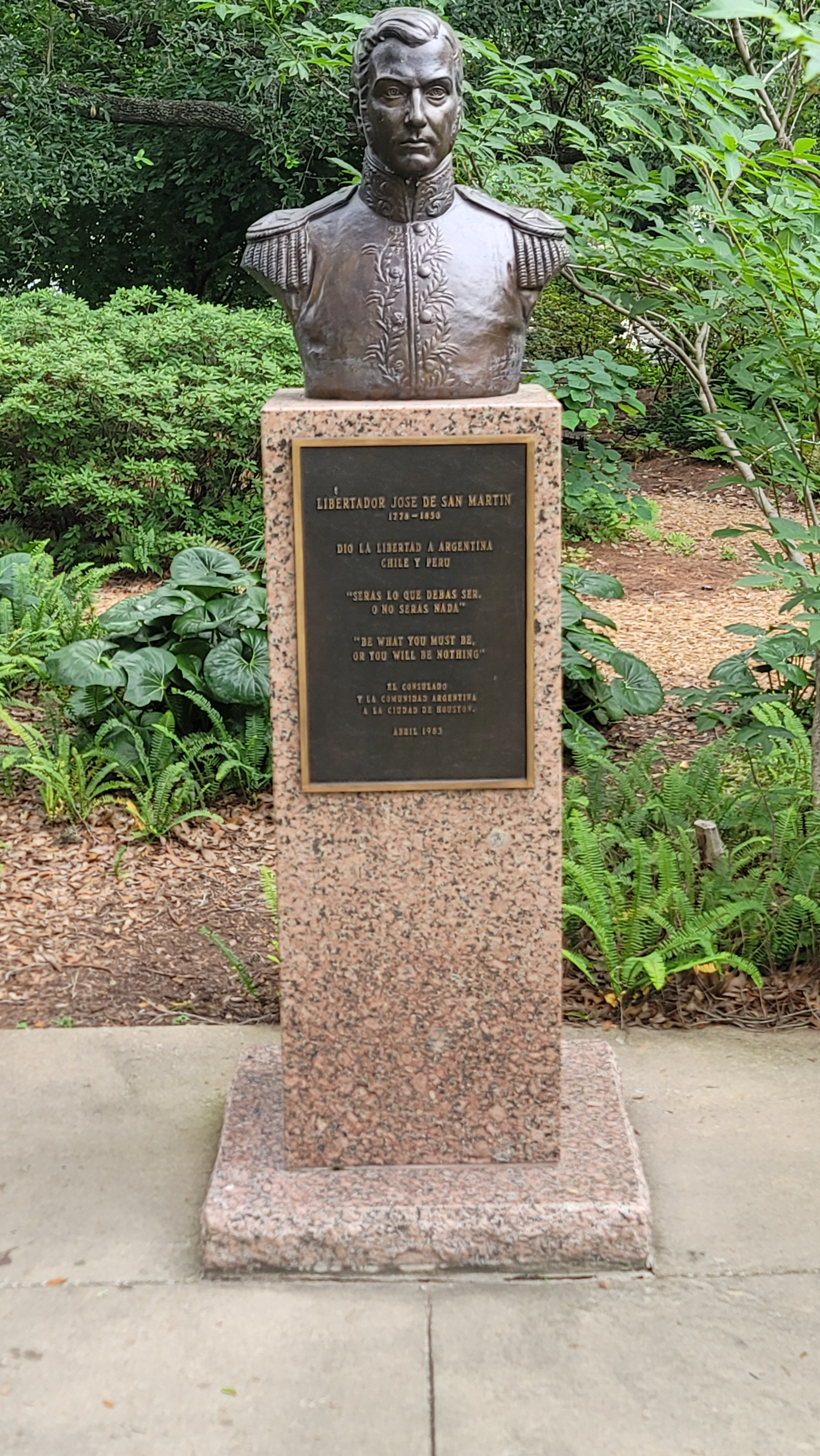
- The bust in May 2023
- Artist: Pedro Buigues
- Type: Sculpture
- Medium: Bronze (bust); granite (pedestal)
- Subject: José de San Martín
- Location: Houston, Texas, United States; 29°43′19″N 95°23′17.2″W

An outdoor sculpture of José de San Martín by Pedro Buigues is installed at Hermann Park's McGovern Centennial Gardens in Houston, Texas, in the United States. The memorial, acquired in 1983, has bronze bust and a granite pedestal.

== See also ==
- List of public art in Houston
