= Bust of Ramón Castilla =

Sculpture in Houston, Texas, U.S.

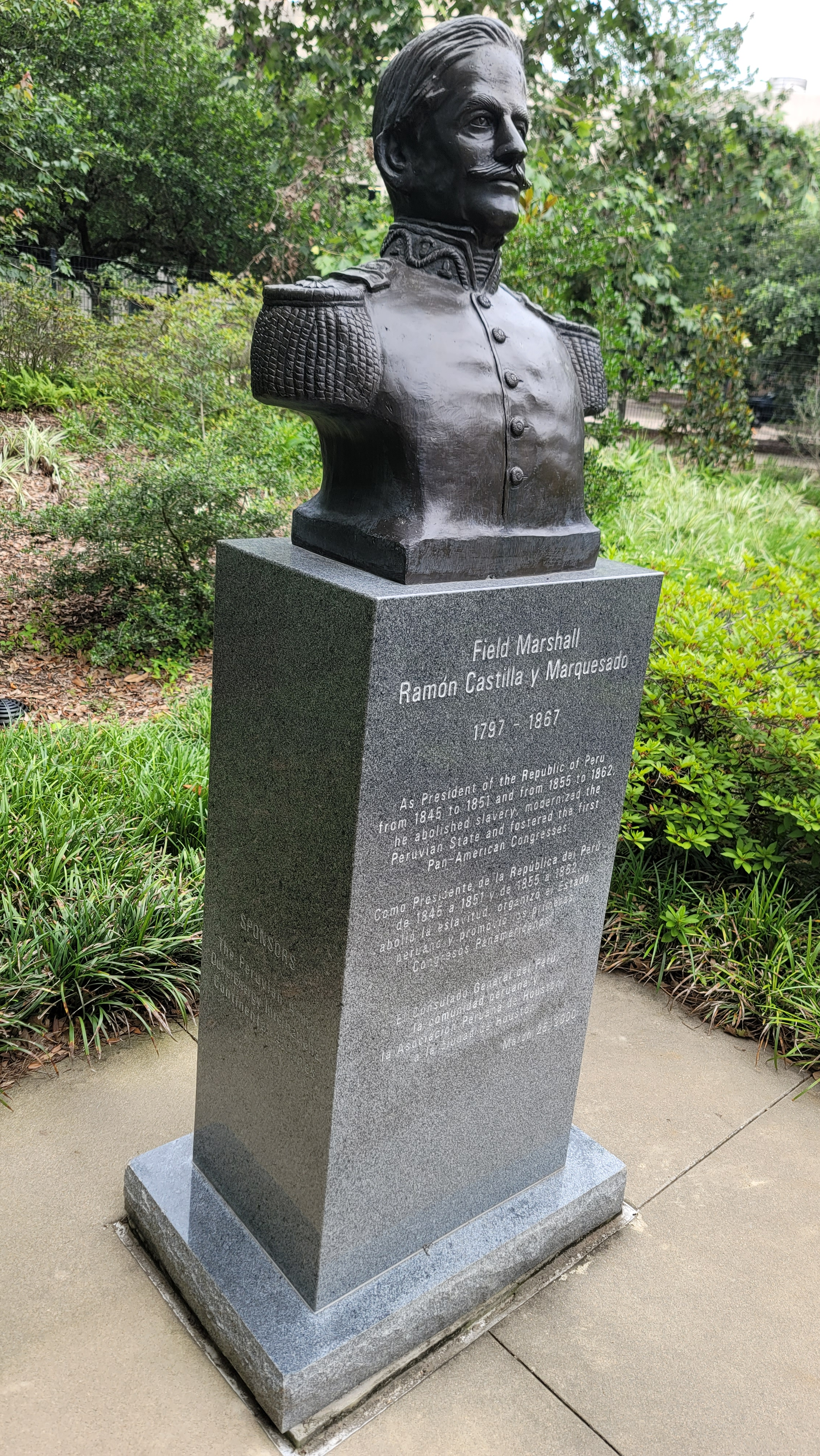
- Type: Sculpture
- Subject: Ramón Castilla
- Location: Houston, Texas, United States; 29°43′19.4″N 95°23′17.7″W

Ramón Castilla, also known as Field Marshal Ramón Castilla or Ramón Castilla y Marquesado, is an outdoor bronze sculpture of the Peruvian caudillo and President of the same name by an unknown artist, installed at Hermann Park's McGovern Centennial Gardens in Houston, Texas, in the United States. The bust had been installed in Hermann Park's International Sculpture Garden since 1991.

== See also ==
- List of public art in Houston
