= Zao Zhi =

Official serving under Cao Cao (fl.190s)

- 棗祗

Commandant of Agricultural Colonies (屯田都尉)
- In office 196 – ?
- Monarch: Emperor Xian of Han

Inspector of the Guards of the Feathered Forest (羽林監)
- Monarch: Emperor Xian of Han

Magistrate of Dong'a (東阿令)
- In office c.192–?
- Monarch: Emperor Xian of Han

Administrator of Chenliu (陳留太守)

Personal details
- Born: Unknown Yingchuan Commandery
- Died: Unknown
- Relations: Zao Ju (c.230 - 280s; grandson and son of Zao Shuwei); Zao Tian (great-grandson and son of Zao Ju); Zao Song (great-grandson and younger brother of Zao Tian)
- Children: Zao Chuzhong; Zao Shuwei
- Occupation: Politician

Zao Zhi (fl.190s) was an early follower and official of the Chinese warlord Cao Cao in the late Eastern Han dynasty of China. He would stay loyal when Cao Cao's base revolted against him and come up with the plan to adopt the tuntian farming system that would be an important part of Cao Cao's rise and the future Wei dynasty.

== Early life ==
Zao Zhi was from Yingchuan Commandery, (around present-day Xuchang, Henan), his family once named Ji (棘), but an ancestor had been forced into exile and surname was changed to Zao. During the Han dynasty, he served as Administrator of Chenliu (陳留太守).

On 25 September 189, the general Dong Zhuo seized control of the capital Luoyang and deposed Emperor Shao. In 190 various leading gentry would raise forces and join a coalition against Dong Zhuo, one such man was Cao Cao and Zao Zhi would raise men to join with Cao Cao. When Yuan Shao, head of the coalition and old friend of Cao Cao, sought to recruit Zao Zhi as he had successfully done with early Cao supporters the Zhou family, Zao Zhi refused.

== Defence of Yan ==
In 194, Cao Cao was Governor of Yan province but he was away with a brutal campaign in Xu province and its leader Tao Qian over the assassination of his father Cao Song. Several people in Yan province were unsettled by Cao Cao's recent actions and one old friend Zhang Miao, Administrator of Chenliu, feared Cao Cao might be persuaded by Yuan Shao to kill him. Allying with the fierce warlord Lü Bu on the advice of Chen Gong, Zhang Miao led a revolt, with most of the province falling.

At the time, Zao Zhi was Magistrate of Dong'e (東阿令) (near present-day Dong'e in Shandong) and he was able to hold the city, one of only three commanderies in the province (alongside Fan and Juancheng) that remained loyal to Cao Cao. Zao Zhi was noted to have led the officials and garrisoned the walls effectively, allowing the arriving Cheng Yu to take over command and oversee the defence. Cao Cao would return and battle Lü Bu and when locusts brought fame, Cao Cao would turn to Zao Zhi's work in Dong'a to keep him supplied while Lü Bu was greatly weakened by the famine. Cao Cao would drive out Lü Bu by the summer of 195 and destroyed the Zhang family stronghold early in 196.

== Tuntian reforms ==
In 196, Cao Cao gained control of the Han Emperor Xian and moved the capital to Xuchang while Zao Zhi was now Inspector of the Guards of the Feathered Forest (羽林監) which placed him in charge of a corp of the Emperor's guards as part of Cao Cao surrounding the Emperor with his own loyalists. Cao Cao and his advisers discussed how to strengthen his position in the new capital, how to address the problem of landless people, and the consistent headache of famine and supply problems with Zao Zhi and close aide Han Hao the leading advocates for implementing a tuntian agricultural system. This was not a new idea, the Han had used the military agricultural colonies on their frontiers, while the warlords Tao Qian and northern warlord Gongsun Zan had used such systems. But Zao Zhi and co. were proposing a more comprehensive plan to include more of the population, especially those of lesser means, than had been implemented in prior agricultural colonies, a reform described by historian Victor Cunrui Xiong as of far-reaching significance. Cao Cao agreed and recently surrendered Yellow Turbans were put to the fields with captured equipment.

However, there was discussion about how best to implement the agricultural reforms. Zao Zhi would argue for tax of produce from the land, with share-cropping part of his plans, as able to benefit when things went well while required to give grants of exemption in hard times for farmers. Others, with Hou Sheng (侯聲) the named lead figure, argued for a fixed tax for the leasing of oxen as kinder to tenants. Cao Cao consulted with lead adviser Xun Yu and eventually backed Zao Zhi, appointing Zao Zhi Commandant of Agricultural Colonies (屯田都尉) under the supervision of Cao Cao's logistical head Ren Jun.

People were gathered to farmland around Xuchang and resettled, within years the granaries were full while the Weishu boasted of how it ended logistical problems, comparing the strength of the regime to the struggles of the powerful warlords Yuan Shao and Yuan Shu to feed their armies. While struggles with supplies show this was an exaggeration, the reforms were important and a considerable success and, though only to a small part, would be extended elsewhere in Cao Cao's expanding lands. They allowed Cao Cao to resettle refugees from the civil war and provide them land with the government taking their share in taxes, providing a reliable source of supplies for his campaigns. The stability and offer of land drew people into Cao Cao's lands to settle depopulated areas while keeping the manpower for corvee labour and defence, and their taxes (50% if not given supplies, 60% if loaned oxen), in the hands of central authority and from out of the hands of powerful families. It would form the backbone of the Cao Wei economy until 263 as the powerful controller Sima Zhao lessened control of the agricultural colonies as he prepared for the creation of the Jin dynasty.

== Death and legacy ==
Zao Zhi died a few years later, not living to see his policy fulfilled and Ren Jun would continue the project. It was said that "the wealth of the army and the state began with Zao Zhi and reached fulfilment with Ren Jun". In 220, the last year of Cao Cao's life, the now King of Wei decided to honour Zao Zhi, remarking he often thought of him, and composed a eulogy. Regretting he had never given Zao Zhi a fief and that he had not been honoured as he should have been, Cao Cao enoffed Zhi's son Chuzhong (處中) to ensure Zhi would be sacrificed to.

Chen Shou the creator of the Records of the Three Kingdoms did not give Zao Zhi his own biography, but Cao Cao's eulogy was recorded in the Memoirs of Emperor Wu of Wei (魏武故事; Wèi Wǔ Gùshì) which was added to the Annotated Records of the Three Kingdoms by Pei Songzhi, while the historian Carl Leban notes Zao Zhi's importance for his ideas.
