= City Reflections =

Sculpture in Portland, Oregon, U.S.

- The sculpture in 2016
- Artist: Patti Warashina
- Year: 2009
- Type: Sculpture
- Medium: Bronze; granite
- Subject: Woman and dog
- Location: 45.51660°N 122.67989°W

City Reflections is an outdoor 2009 bronze sculpture by Patti Warashina, located in downtown Portland, Oregon.

== Description and history ==
City Reflections was designed by American artist Patti Warashina, who was inspired by life on a public walkway in an urban environment. It was installed at the intersection of Southwest 6th Avenue and Southwest Main Street on the Portland Transit Mall in 2009. It consists of two bronze sculptures depicting a standing figure and dog, respectively. According to TriMet, which funded the work, the humanoid figure is a "stylized version of a strong female in both a classical and minimal form", while the dog serves as a "counterbalance" and is the "friendly canine companion that is so much a part of our popular culture". The woman measures 86 inches (2.2 m) x 21 inches (0.53 m) x 19 inches (0.48 m) and the dog measures 33 inches (0.84 m) x 13 inches (0.33 m) x 27 inches (0.69 m).

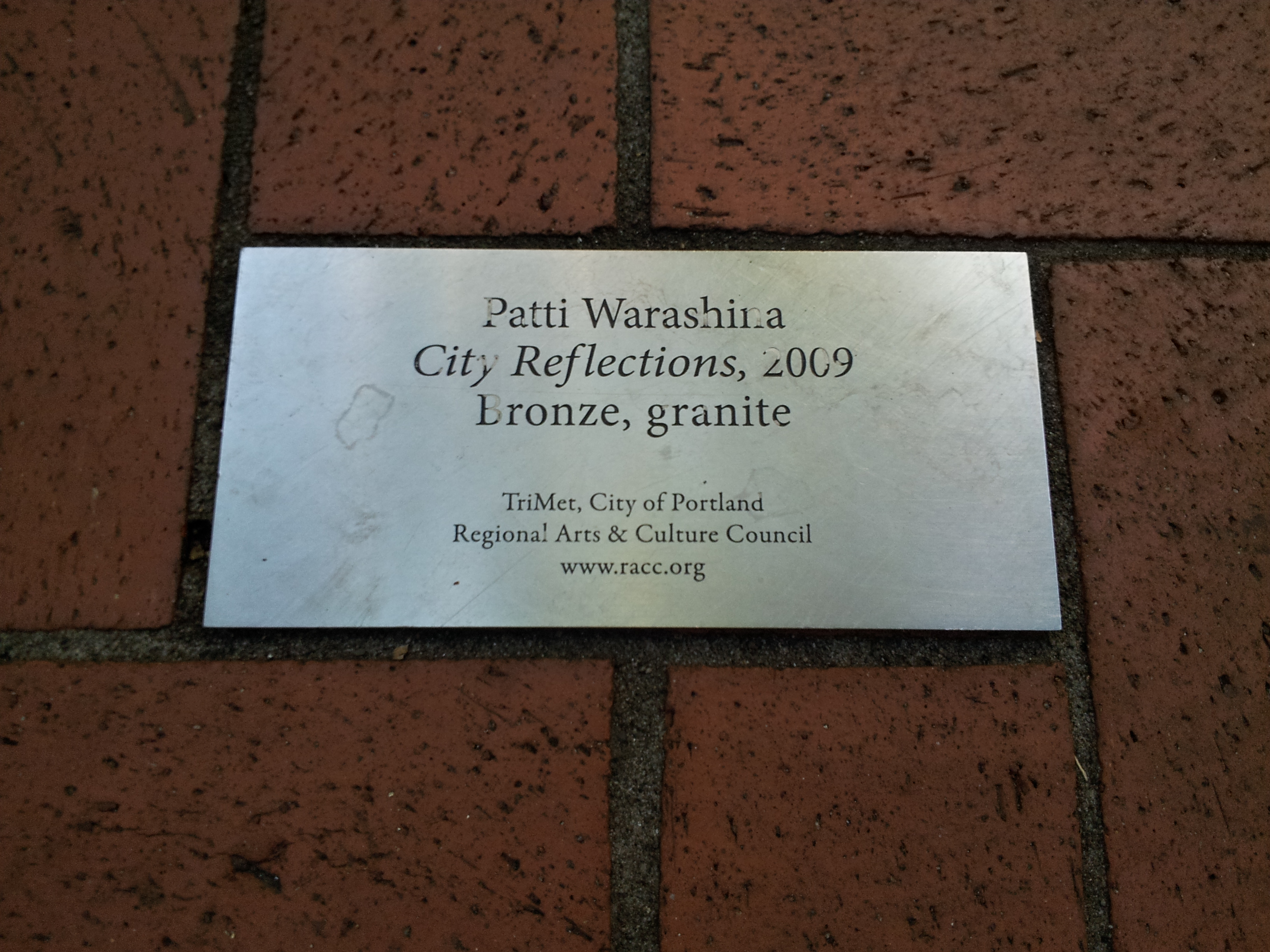
Plaque for the sculpture

Both sculptures feature black and copper geometric shapes. The black shapes allude to aspects of the human body as well as the "shapes and shadows" of nearby buildings. The copper shapes represent "computer-generated forms, which speak to the times we live in". Dark shadows are depicted on the sidewalk, serving as "natural transitions" to pedestrians and signaling the time of day. The woman's shadow measures 58 inches (1.5 m) x 26 inches (0.66 m) and the dog's shadow measures 27 inches (0.69 m) x 48 inches (1.2 m).

City Reflections is part of the City of Portland and Multnomah County Public Art Collection courtesy of the Regional Arts & Culture Council (RACC), which administers the work. In 2013, RACC staff members deemed the sculpture too sensitive to corrosion due to its glossy finish to participate in the Downtown Marketing Initiative's "UglySweaterPDX" campaign, which outfits sculptures with "yard-bombed" articles of clothing, to promote shopping in downtown Portland.

== See also ==
- 2009 in art
- Cultural depictions of dogs
