= Continuation (sculpture) =

Sculpture series in Portland, Oregon, U.S.

- Part of the installation in 2016
- Artist: Michihiro Kosuge
- Year: 2009
- Type: Sculpture
- Medium: Granite
- Location: Portland, Oregon, United States; 45.5136879°N 122.6805057°W
- Owner: City of Portland and Multnomah County Public Art Collection courtesy of the Regional Arts & Culture Council

Continuation is an outdoor 2009 granite series of sculptures by Japanese artist Michihiro Kosuge, installed along Portland, Oregon's Transit Mall, in the United States. It is part of the City of Portland and Multnomah County Public Art Collection courtesy of the Regional Arts & Culture Council, which administers the work.

== Description ==
Michihiro Kosuge's Continuation (2009) is a series of carved red granite sculptures installed along Southwest 6th Avenue and Southwest Clay Street between Columbia and Clay in the Portland Transit Mall. The five pieces measure 5 feet (1.5 m) x 53 feet (16 m) x 15 feet (4.6 m), 45 feet (14 m) x 53 feet (16 m) x 15 feet (4.6 m), 65 feet (20 m) x 15 feet (4.6 m) x 53 feet (16 m), 110 feet (34 m) x 22 feet (6.7 m) x 53 feet (16 m), 15 feet (4.6 m) x 24 feet (7.3 m) x 63 feet (19 m), respectively. The artist re-used granite from a fountain and sculpture previously installed along the mall.

According to the Regional Arts & Culture Council, which administers the work:

The designated location for the work was unusual in that it encompassed the outdoor spaces of the Hotel Modera as well as the adjoining sidewalk. For the artist, the material and the site presented both opportunities and challenges. In particular, he wanted to create relationships between the multiple pieces while allowing each piece to stand on its own. For the concept, Kosuge began by studying the stones, which were relatively small and with curved edges. Their size and shape were central in determining what the final work would look like. The resulting five sculptures involve interconnecting visual elements that include repetition, tension and stability. Hopefully, each viewer will have a unique opportunity to enjoy the pieces from different perspectives and to understand the relationship of the sculptural shapes to one another.

The sculpture is part of the City of Portland and Multnomah County Public Art Collection courtesy of the Regional Arts & Culture Council.

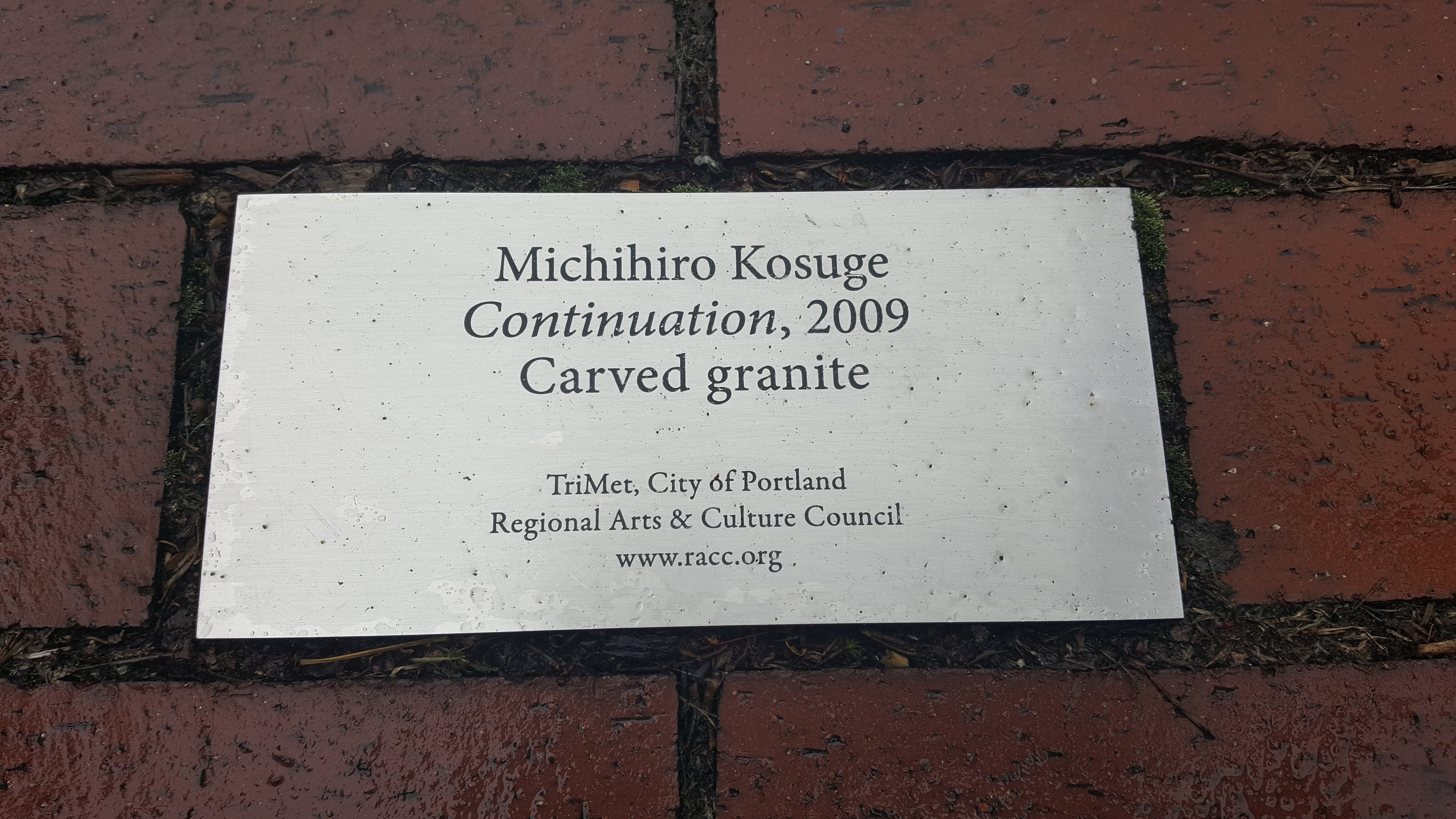
Plaque for the sculpture

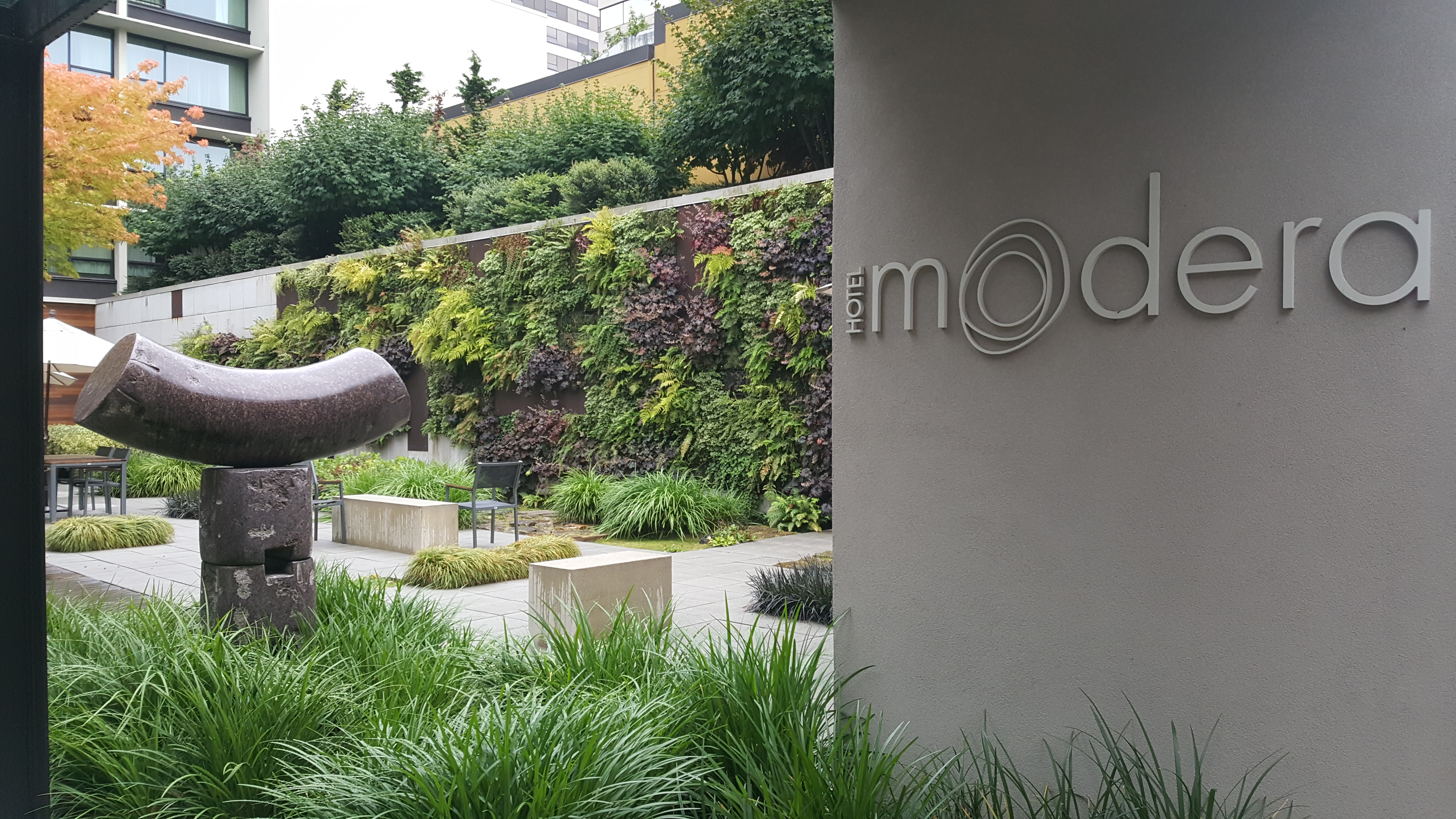
The sculpture is installed along Hotel Modera's outdoor spaces and adjacent sidewalk.

== See also ==
- 2009 in art
