= Bust of José Rizal =

Sculpture in Houston, Texas, U.S.

Dr. José P. Rizal
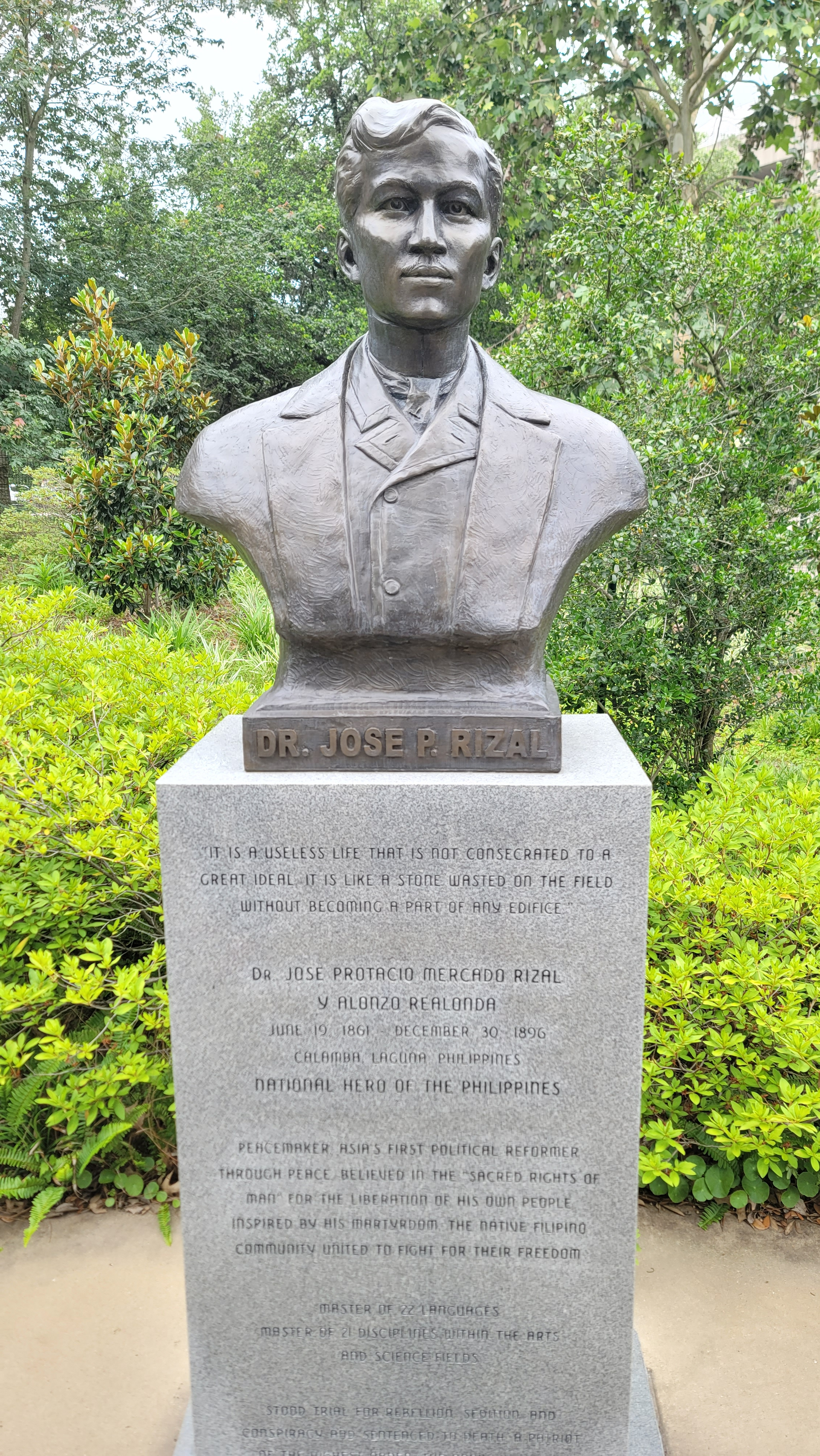
- Bust of José P. Rizal in May 2023
- Artist: Lorena Toritch
- Type: Sculpture
- Subject: José Rizal
- Location: Houston, Texas, United States; 29°43′19.7″N 95°23′17.7″W

Dr. José P. Rizal is an outdoor sculpture of the Filipino nationalist of the same name by Lorena Toritch, installed at Hermann Park's McGovern Centennial Gardens in Houston, Texas, in the United States. The bust was acquired by the City of Houston in 2006.

== See also ==
- List of places named after José Rizal
- List of public art in Houston
