= Richard Rhodes (poet) =

English poet and dramatist

- Died: 1668; Madrid, Spain
- Occupations: Poet and dramatist

Richard Rhodes (died 1668) was an English poet and dramatist.

== Biography ==
Rhodes was the son of a gentleman in London. He received his education at Westminster School, whence he was elected to a studentship at Christ Church, Oxford. He matriculated there on 31 July 1658. When he went to the university he was already "well grounded in grammar and in the practical part of music." He graduated B.A. on 22 March 1661–2. Wood heard that he afterwards took a degree in physic at Montpelier. Subsequently, he travelled in Spain, and died at Madrid in 1668.

He was the author of "Flora's Vagaries;" a comedy, publicly acted by the students of Christ Church in their common refectory on 8 January 1663–4, and in London at the Theatre Royal by his majesty's servants, the part of Flora being taken by "Mrs. Ellen Gwin." It was published anonymously at London in 1670, and again in 1677, 4to.

Rhodes is mentioned by Wood as one of the sixteen persons who, like himself, frequented the weekly meetings at the house of Mr. Ellis for the cultivation of the "delightful facultie of musick," and he is described as "a junior student of Christ Church, a confident Westmonasterian, a violinist to hold between his knees.: His name is also handed down in the second part of an anonymous :Session of the Poets: (stanza xli.):

Rhodes stood and play'd bo-peep in the door,
But Apollo, instead of a Spanish plot,
On condition the varlet would never write more,
Gave him three pence to pay for a pipe and a pot.
