= Bust of José Martí =

Sculpture by Tony Lopez in Houston, Texas, U.S.

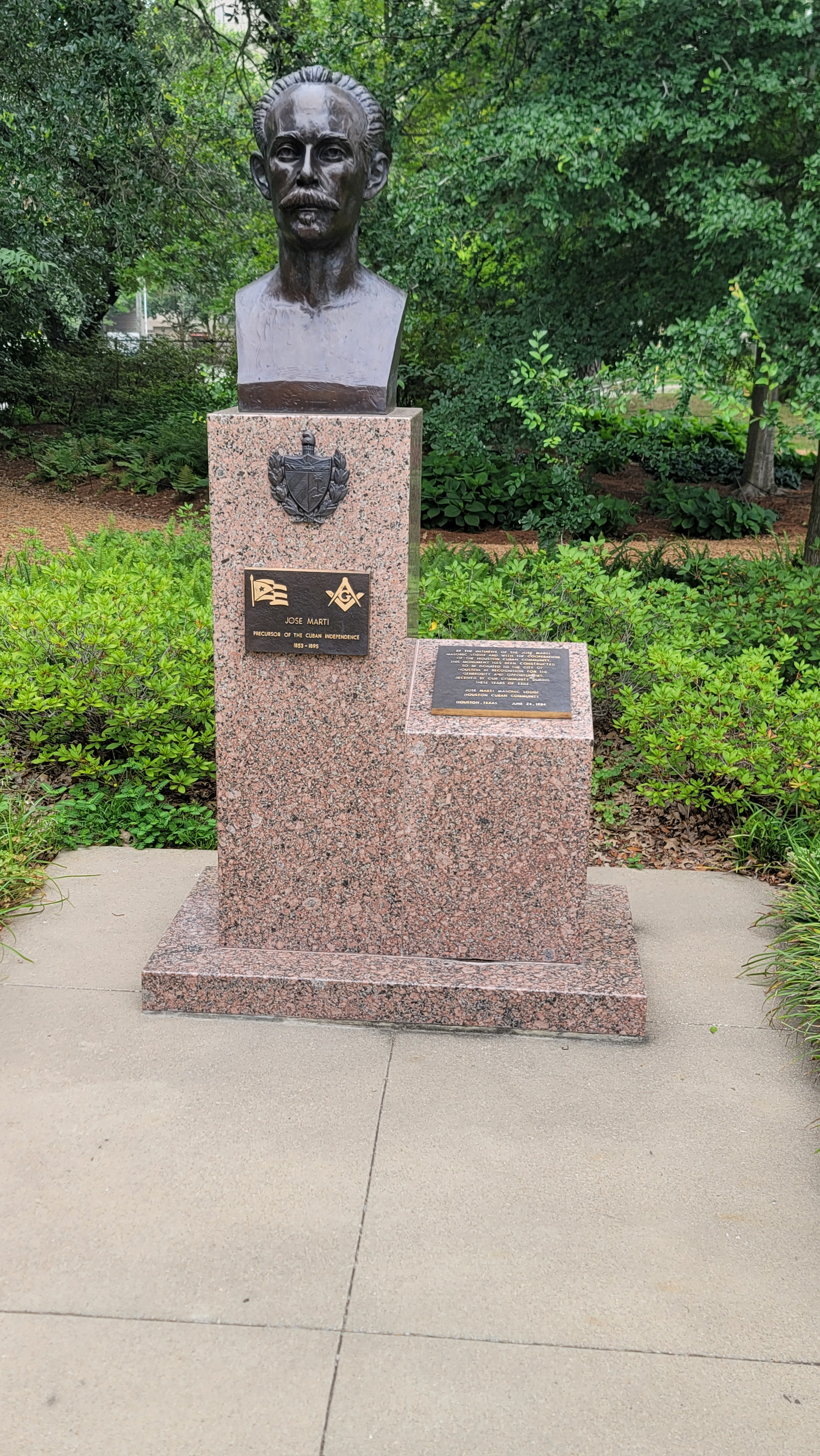
- Bust of José Martí in May 2023
- Artist: Tony Lopez
- Year: 1981
- Type: Sculpture
- Medium: Bronze (sculpture); Granite (pedestal)
- Subject: José Martí
- Location: Houston, Texas, United States; 29.71802°N 95.38386°W
- Owner: City of Houston
- Website: Jose Martí (with photo)l

An outdoor bust of José Martí by Cuban artist Tony Lopez is installed at Hermann Park's McGovern Centennial Gardens in Houston, Texas, United States. The bust was acquired by the City of Houston in 1981.

== Gallery ==
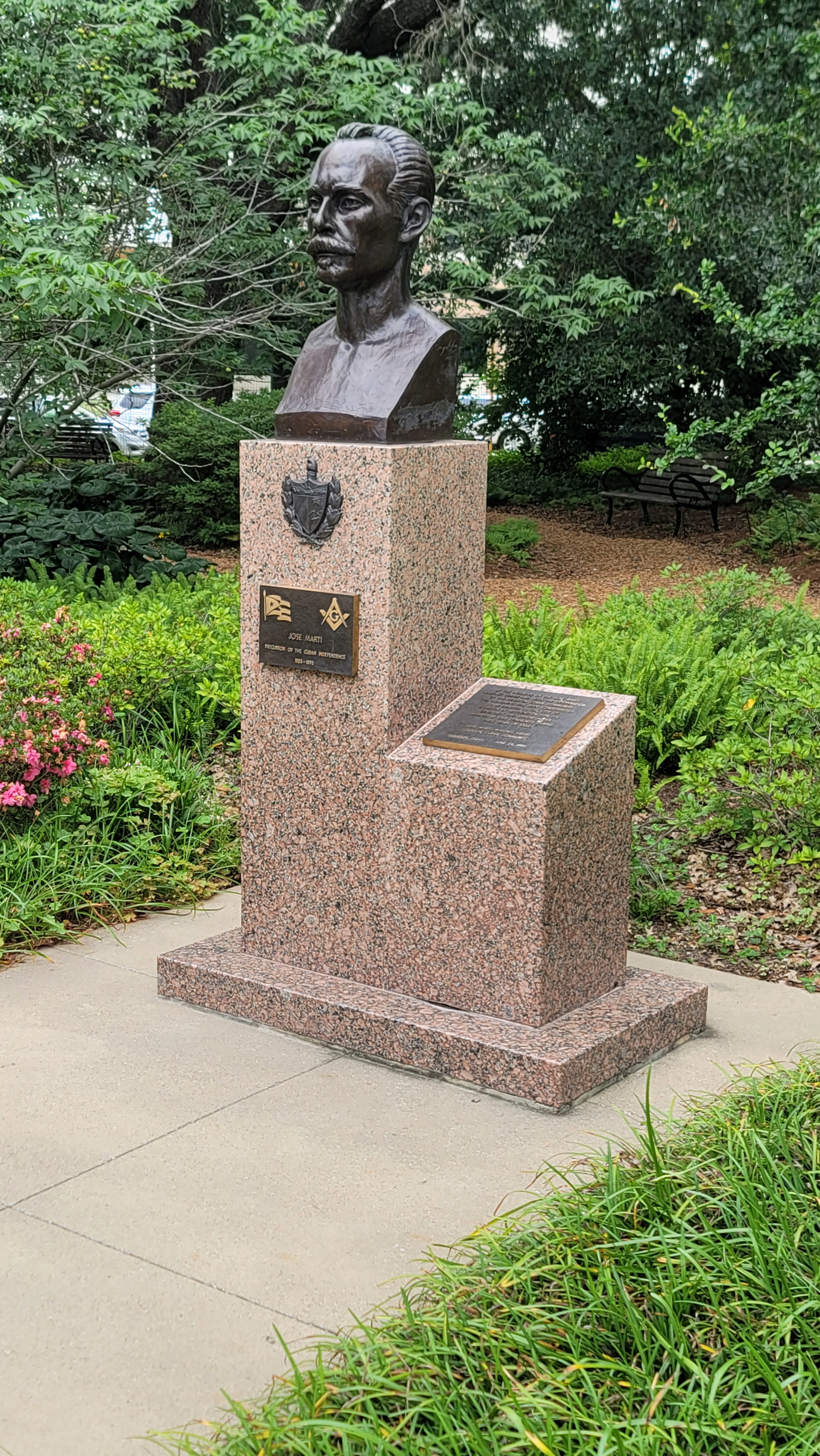

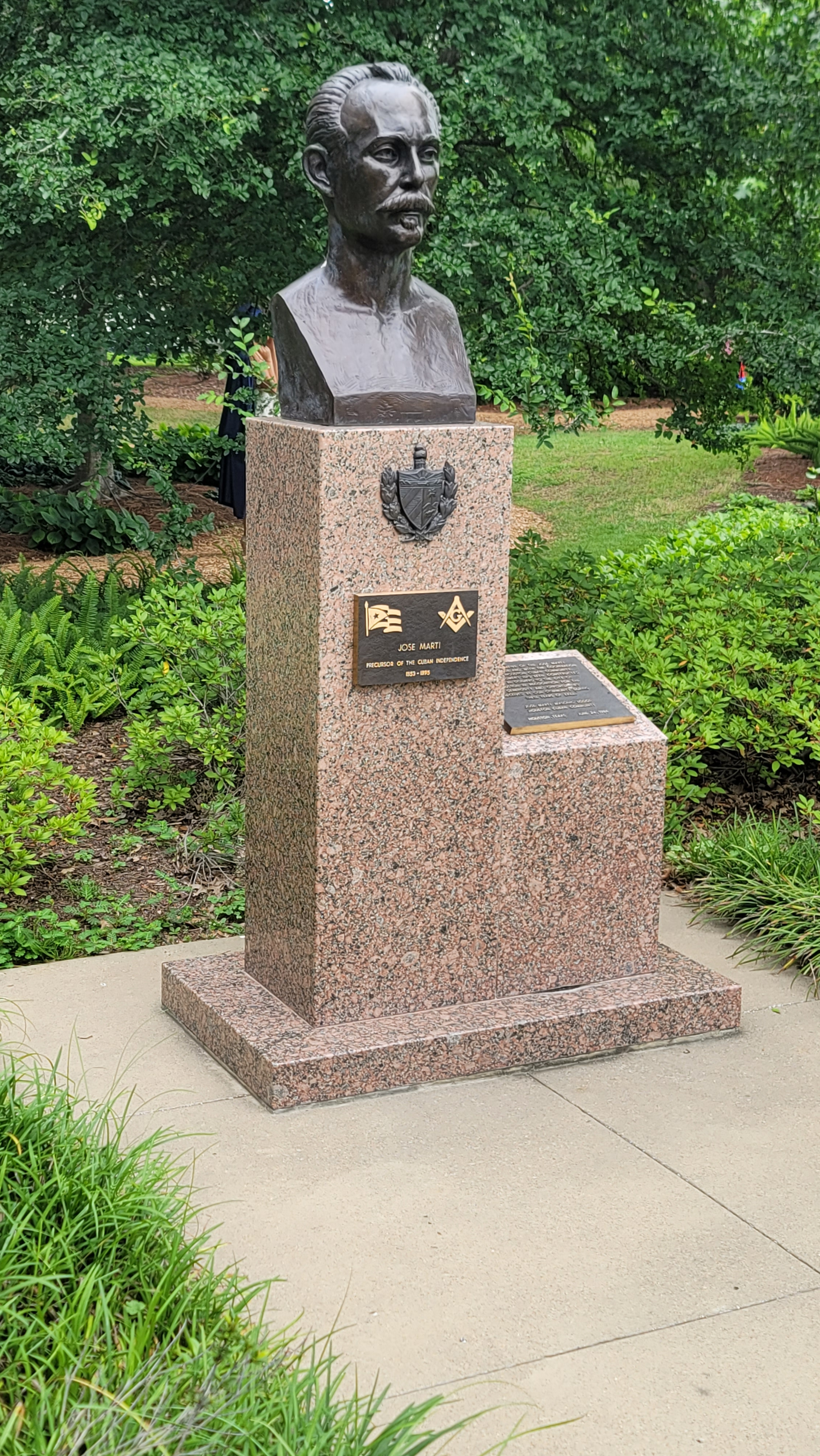

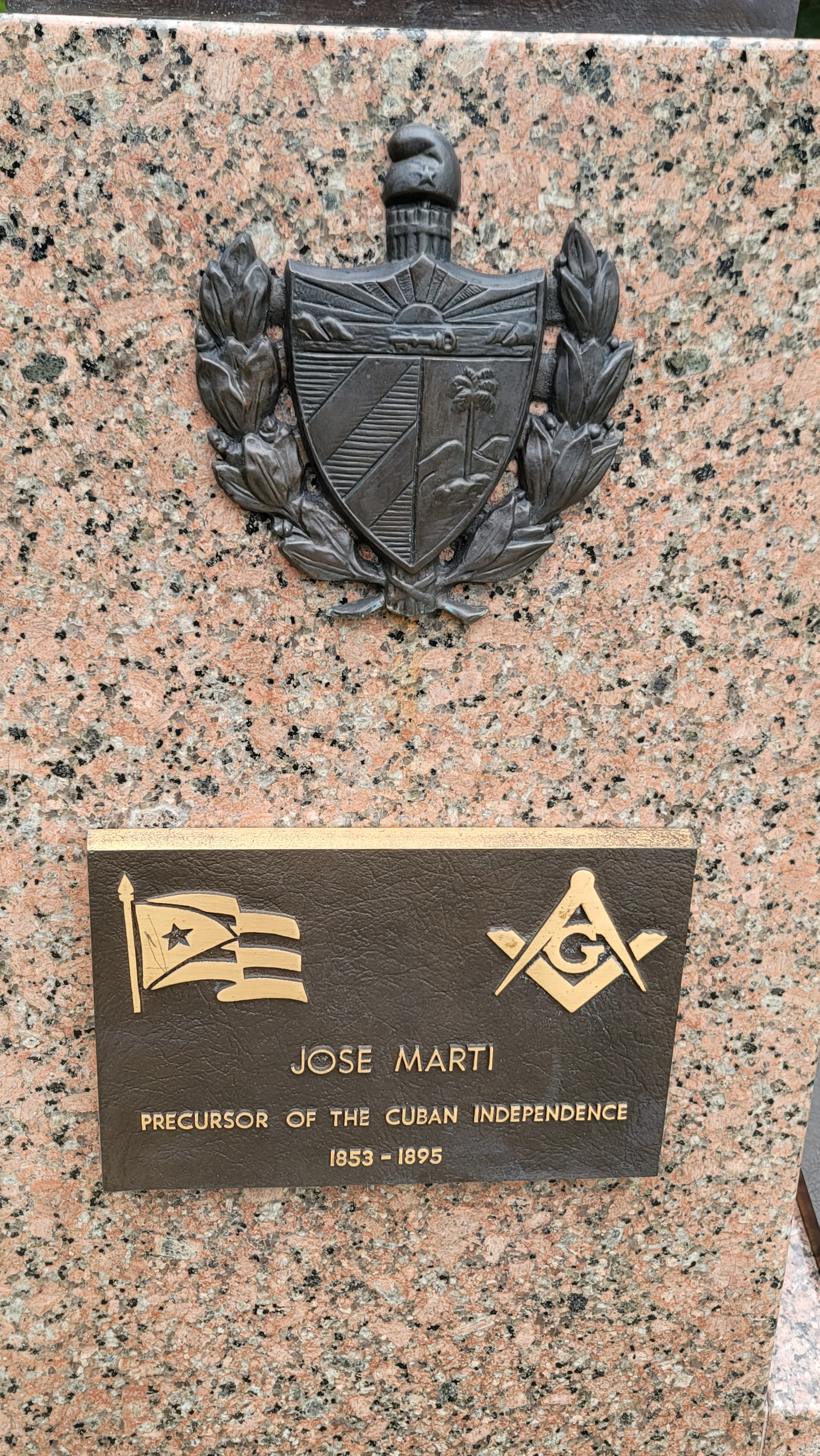
Plaque #1 detail

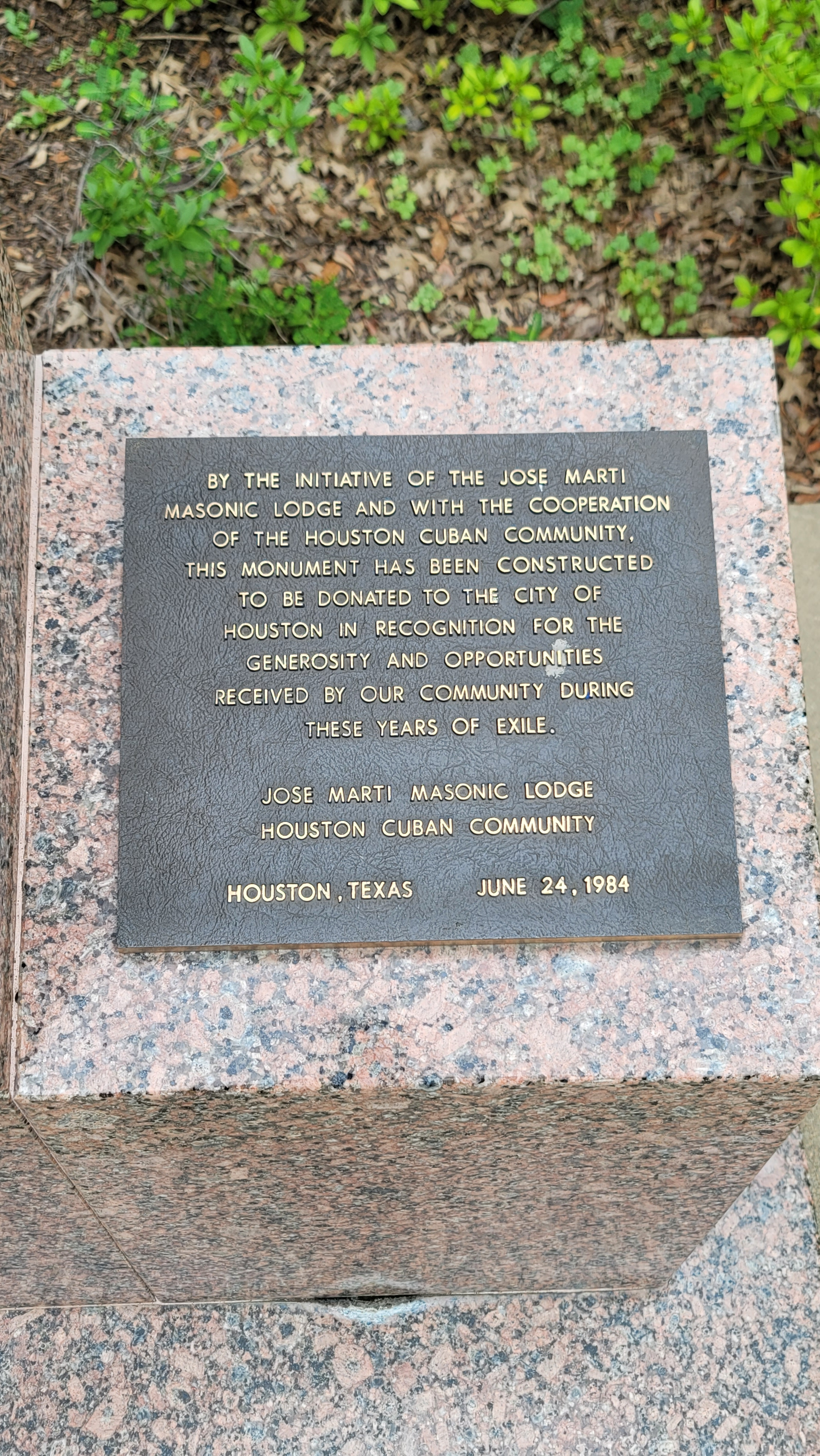
Plague #2 detail

== See also ==
- List of public art in Houston
- Freemasonry in Cuba
