= Ren Jun =

Military officer serving under Cao Cao (died 204)

- 任峻

Changshui Colonel (長水校尉)
- In office ? – 204

Agriculture General of the Household (典農中郎將)
- In office c. 196–?

Cavalry Commandant (騎都尉)
- In office c. 190–?

Registrar (主簿) (under Yang Yuan)
- In office 189 – c. 190
- Monarch: Emperor Xian of Han

Personal details
- Born: Unknown; Zhongmu County, Henan
- Died: 204
- Spouse: Cao Cao's cousin
- Children: Ren Xian; Ren Lan
- Occupation: Military officer
- Courtesy name: Boda (伯達)
- Posthumous name: Marquis Cheng (成侯)
- Peerage: Marquis of a Chief Village (都亭侯)

Ren Jun (died 204), courtesy name Boda, was a military officer serving under the warlord Cao Cao in the late Eastern Han dynasty of China. Leaving his home, he was an early follower and trusted aide of Cao; Ren would often oversee the supply lines and was entrusted with implementing the key tuntian farming system.

== Life ==
Ren Jun was from Zhongmu County (中牟縣), Henan Commandery which is present-day Zhongmu County, Henan.

In 189, the general Dong Zhuo took advantage of the power vacuum, created in the aftermath of the conflict between the regent He Jin and the eunuch faction, to seize control of the Han central government. He changed the Emperor, setting up the young figurehead Emperor Xian and began a brutal rule in Luoyang that sparked revolt from many powerful figures who formed a coalition. Zhongmu was right in the path of the northern half of the coalition armies so Yang Yuan (楊原), the Prefect of Zhongmu County, started panicking and wanted to abandon his post and leave. Ren Jun advised him to stay and urged him to take the lead in calling for everyone to rise up against Dong Zhuo and overthrow him. When Yang Yuan asked him what he should do, Ren Jun advised him to assume the position of acting Intendant of Henan (河南尹), (Note: The Intendant of Henan (河南尹) refers to the highest-ranking government official in charge of Henan Commandery (河南) in the Eastern Han dynasty. The Han imperial capital, Luoyang, was a county under Henan Commandery.) bring all the counties in Henan Commandery under his leadership, and rally as many men as possible to form an army to fight Dong Zhuo's forces. Yang Yuan appointed Ren Jun as his Registrar (主簿) and proceeded to implement his suggestions when Ren Jun memorialized Yang Yuan as Intendant, though there would be other claimants like Zhang Yang. while Zhu Jun held the official title and Yang Yuan's control was limited to the eastern part of Henan.

== Service under Cao Cao ==
In 190, another potential power entered Henei. Cao Cao had raised an army to join a coalition of warlords on a campaign against Dong Zhuo and sought to pursue the retreating Dong Zhuo. When he entered Zhongmu County, the various officials in Henan Commandery could not decide on whether they should follow Cao Cao. After discussing with Zhang Fen (張奮), Ren Jun decided that he would follow Cao Cao and Zhongmu joined Cao Cao. Ren Jun also gathered all his family members, relatives, servants and retainers, numbering a few hundred people in total, and brought them along to join Cao Cao.

However, Cao Cao would suffer a heavy defeat against Dong Zhuo's general Xu Rong, so was forced to leave Henan and rebuild his army. Yang Yuan and Zhang Fen disappear from the records, but Ren Jun left Henei to stay with Cao Cao. Cao Cao was so pleased to gain such support from Ren Jun that he appointed him as a Cavalry Commandant (騎都尉). He also arranged for Ren Jun to marry one of his second cousins and treated Ren Jun as a close aide.

== Role with supplies and agriculture ==
Since then, whenever Cao Cao went on military campaigns, he put Ren Jun in charge of logistics and the provision of supplies for his troops at the frontline. In 196, Cao Cao received Emperor Xian and brought him to his base in Xu County (許縣; present-day Xuchang, Henan), which became the new imperial capital. Cao Cao effectively gained control over the Han central government and the figurehead emperor. In 196, Cao Cao made a change, involving Ren Jun that would have significant impact in his successes as a warlord, securing supplies for all his campaigns and taxes, drawing in refugees to settle lands and tying people to him.

During the early stage of the civil war, famine was rampant and warlords struggled to maintain consistent supply to their armies. An official Zao Zhi, also advocated by trusted aide Han Hao, suggested implementing the tuntian system of agriculture to produce a sustainable supply of grain for Cao Cao's growing army. Cao Cao heeded Zao Zhi's suggestion and appointed Ren Jun as Agriculture General of the Household (典農中郎將), giving him the salary and authority of the head of a commandry, to supervise the implementation of the tuntian system. Within years, the tuntian system turned out to be a success as the granaries became fully stocked with grain. There was a saying that “the wealth of the army and the state began with Zao Zhi and accomplished by Ren Jun”.

In 200, during the Battle of Guandu between Cao Cao and his rival Yuan Shao, Ren Jun was in charge of logistics and transportation of weapons, equipment, supplies, etc., to the frontline. After Yuan Shao's forces attacked Cao Cao's supply trains on a number of occasions, Ren Jun organised the supply trains into groups of 1,000 wagons and arranged for them to travel along several different routes heavily protected by camps and pickets. Yuan Shao's forces did not dare to attack Cao Cao's supply trains after that.

== Promotion and death ==
Cao Cao proposed to the Han imperial court to commend Ren Jun for his achievement by enfeoffing him as a Marquis of a Chief Village (都亭侯) with a marquisate of 300 taxable households. Later, he promoted Ren Jun to the position of a Changshui Colonel (長水校尉), an honorary position.

Ren Jun died in 204. Cao Cao shed tears when he learnt of Ren Jun's death.

== Family ==
Ren Jun's eldest son, Ren Xian (任先), inherited his father's peerage and marquisate. As he had no son to succeed him, his marquisate was abolished after his death.

In late 220, Cao Cao's son and successor Cao Pi usurped the throne from Emperor Xian, ended the Eastern Han dynasty, and established the state of Cao Wei with himself as the new emperor. After his coronation, Cao Pi awarded Ren Jun the posthumous title "Marquis Cheng" (成侯) to honour him for his contributions. He also enfeoffed Ren Lan (任覽), another of Ren Jun's sons who had narrowly avoided being entangled in Wei Feng's failed plot of 219, as a Secondary Marquis (關內侯).

== Appraisal ==
Ren Jun was known for being generous, understanding, and magnanimous while Cao Cao valued his honest advice. During times of famine, Ren Jun provided much assistance to his friends, acquaintances and distant relatives and did not hesitate to use his personal wealth to help the needy and poor. He gained much respect and admiration from the people for his kindness.

Chen Shou in his appraisal of the figures in the volume of biographies that Ren Jun's is contained in, put Ren Jun in a list of exceptional administrators and one of the famed administrators of his generation in Wei, noted his early following of Cao Cao and agricultural development that filled the granaries.

== See also ==
- Lists of people of the Three Kingdoms
