= Richard Rhodes (sculptor) =

American sculptor and stonemason

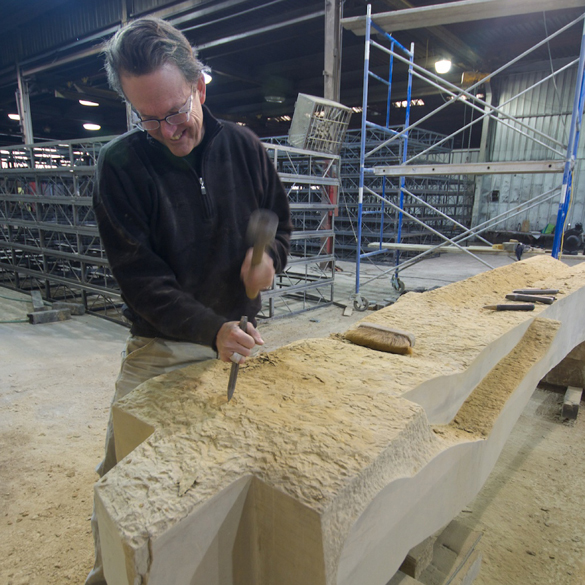
- Born: 1961 (age 64–65); California, United States
- Education: LAMDA, followed by apprenticeship in Siena, Italy
- Known for: Sculpting, stonemasonry, entrepreneur, scholar
- Website: www.rhodesworksdesign.com

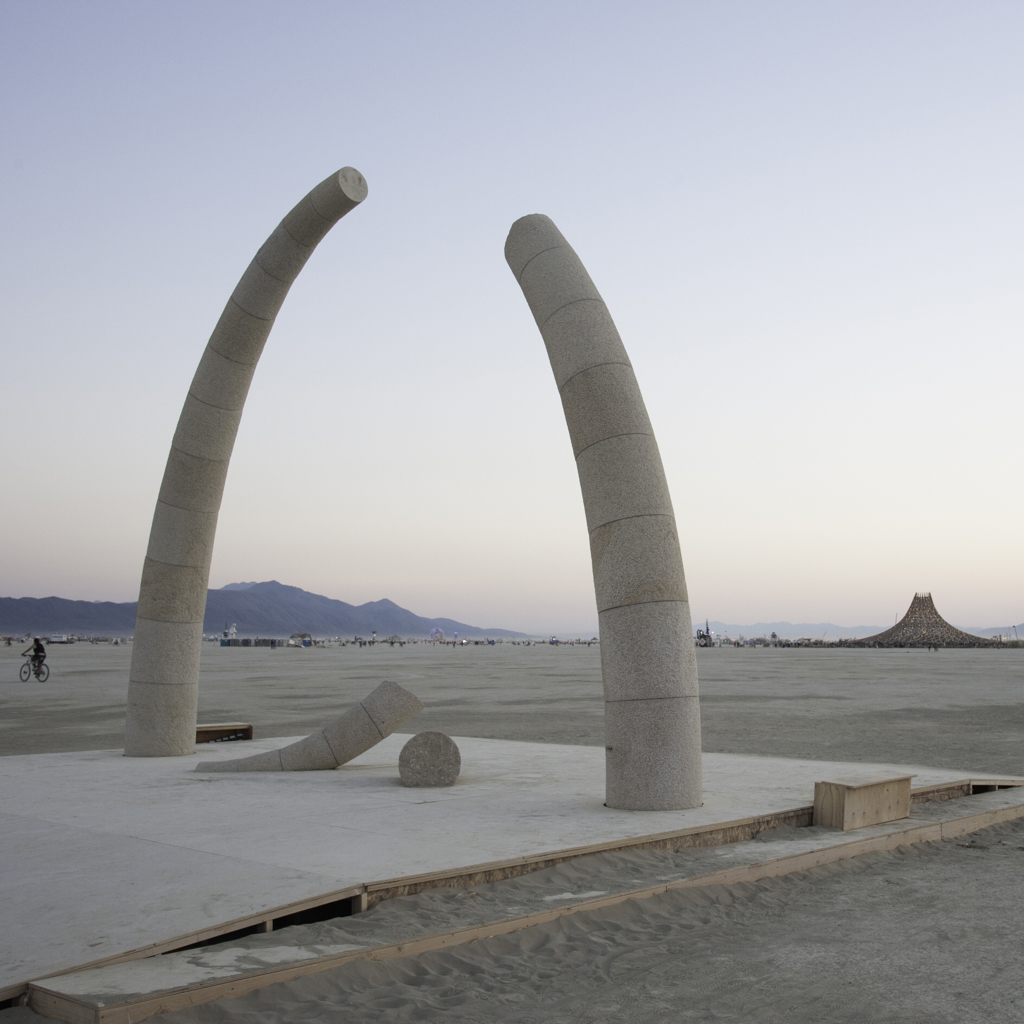
Resolute Arch at Burning Man 2018 created from hand carved granite

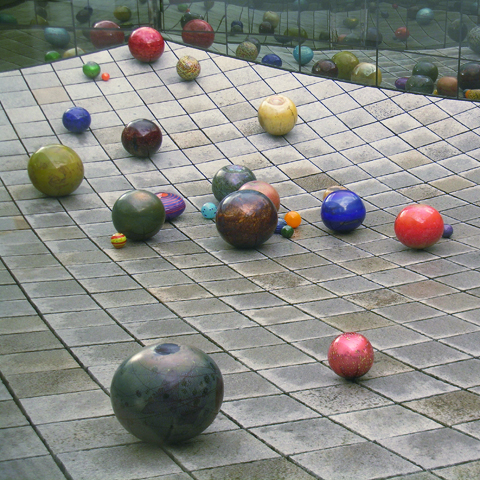
Richard Rhodes' Stone Wave at the Tacoma Art Museum featuring glass work by Dale Chihuly

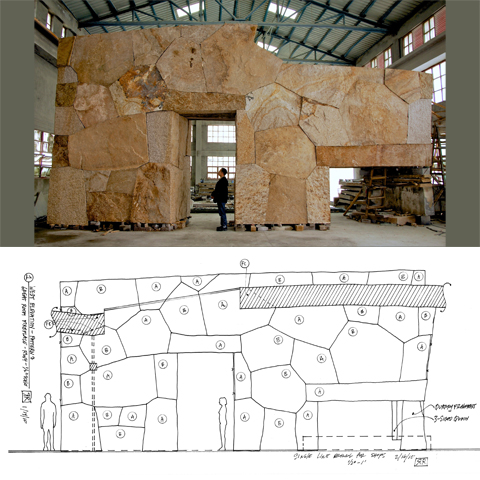
Rhodes' drawing and sculpture – one of four abstract stone volumes at the heart of a private residence.

Richard Rhodes (born 1961) is an American sculptor, stonemason, entrepreneur, and scholar of stonework worldwide.

== Life and career ==
Born in California, Rhodes studied acting at the London Academy of Music and Dramatic Art in 1981. Through his study of medieval ritual and research, Rhodes apprenticed as a stonemason in Siena, Italy, after graduate school. Working with the operative branch of the Freemason's guild in Siena, Rhodes studied the Sacred Geometries and the Sacred Rules of Bondwork as passed down through the medieval guild of the Freemasons. He was the first non-Italian in over 700 years to work as an apprentice under the Freemasons. Rhodes credits his guild training as a major influence in his sculptural practice.

Rhodes is the founder of several Seattle-based businesses including Rhodesworks Design Studio, Rhodes Masonry and Rhodes Architectural Stone.

== Sculpture practice ==
In sculpture, Rhodes' work explores the line between art and architecture, using traditional stone construction with contemporary building techniques. His earlier, expressive and site specific work is self-described as "architectonic." His more current sculptural work is abstract and figurative, visible in his Sentinel Series (various) and Resolute Arch. His work is textural and often draws on the expressive hand finishes Rhodes' learned during his training and apprenticeship in Italy.

Several of his commissions incorporate antique stone objects such as salvaged and worn pavements or stair blocks. Rhodes' largest public sculpture, the two thousand square-foot Untitled – Stone Wave (2004) at the center of Antoine Predock's Tacoma Art Museum, is made of antique granite salvaged from road pave stones in the Fujian region of China. The museum invites other artists to contribute to the space created by Untitled – Stone Wave, using it as a base or canvas. Participating artists include Dale Chihuly who provided the first artwork to be created in this series entitled Niijima Floats (2003) and SuttonBeresCuller created Ship in a Bottle] (2007) by lowering a sail boat into the courtyard. Untitled – Stone Wave (2004) has created a unique exhibition space at the Tacoma Art Museum that "may be the single most dramatic exhibition space in the Northwest."

Pieces from the Sentinel Series, including Sentinel I and Embrace, were featured in the Sculpture by the Sea – Bondi and Sculpture by the Sea – Cottesloe in Sydney (2012) and Perth (2013) respectively. Of Embrace, Sentinel Series, Tom Flynn of The Sculpture Agency writes "Seattle-based sculptor and designer Richard Rhodes’ Embrace: Sentinel Series, comprising two chunky interlocking forms in carved granite, was among the few truly stand-out works, beautifully executed and open to multiple readings. It seemed perfectly at home overlooking the ocean. Brancusi would have liked it." The sculpture was represented by the Hotham Street Contemporary Gallery in Melbourne, Australia and now resides in a private collection in Aspen, Colorado.

As an artist, Rhodes combines the aesthetics of traditional stone construction with contemporary building techniques. Rhodes' current projects include a series of hand carved stone tables meant as monumental outdoor gathering places. The tables have architectural qualities, featuring dovetail joints, butterfly joints and other construction techniques unusual for stone. His most recent sculpture, Resolute Arch, features a 20' high stone arch with a piece broken from the apex. The piece incorporates hand cut stone pieces with an internal tension system for structural support.

Expanding on his figurative and gestural work, he has also produced a series of cast bronze sculptures, Sentinels I & II Bronze shown in private galleries in Aspen and in the Dutko Gallery in London. Rhodes produces his bronze works at the Fonderia artistica Battaglia in Milan, Italy.

== Educator and lecturer ==
Rhodes developed several lectures accredited by the American Institute of Architects (AIA). He has spoken at institutions, firms, studios and conventions, including the national conventions of the American Institute of Architects and the Association of Professional Landscape Designers and Building Stone Institute. He delivered a five-lecture series to the Institute of Classical Architecture in New York and San Francisco. In 2012, he lectured at the Royal Austrian Institute of Architecture (RAIA).

Other notable lectures include the keynote address for the Stonework Symposium XIV at the de Young Museum in San Francisco, titled "Materiality", a lecture at the Strelka Institute of Media, Architecture and Design, titled "Working in a Culture of Chaos: Building Global Infrastructure in the Developing World", an Arts & Lecture Series sponsored by Il Punto in Seattle, Washington titled "The Last Apprentice", and a lecture at the China Academy of Art on invitation by Wang Shu titled "Paths in Stone: China, Material and Modernization".

Rhodes' AIA accredited lectures include "Stone Specification", "Adaptive Re-Use of Reclaimed Stone Materials", "The Sacred Rules of Freemasonry: The Underlying Rules of Stone Design", "Dimensional Stone – Ancient Traditions, Modern Practice", and "The Grain of Stone: Implications for Design and Fabrication".

In 2020, Rhodes gave a TedX Seattle talk on his career and working with stone entitled Hammer, chisel, stone: simple tools for hard moments.

== Architectural stone and architectural design ==
In addition to his sculptural practice, Rhodes used his academic and practical training in masonry and business to found and direct three companies specializing in architectural stone. Through the architectural stone companies, Rhodes has worked with notable architects and firms. His stonework contribution to Olson Kundig Architects' Hong Kong Villa is featured on the cover of Jim Olson: Houses. Rhodes Architectural Stone, under Rhodes' direction, supplied the stonework chosen for the cover photographers of Peter Pennoyer Architects and New Tropical Classics, Hawaiian Homes by Shay Zak.

With Rhodes Architectural Stone, Rhodes purchased 17 villages behind the Three Gorges Dam project in China and successfully recycled the antique stone material into construction of architectural projects in the United States. Rhodes' interest with working in high-density limestone led him to the ancient Chinese villages because of the stones texture and warm characteristics. They were in the process of being abandoned and flooded because of the hydroelectric project, which was set to displace between 1.1 and 1.9 million people. The villages were built out of the same high-density limestone, but with the benefit of a patina from thousands of years of daily use and weathering and Rhodes set out to preserve the material. After two years of negotiation, Rhodes worked with the Chinese government to purchase the limestone that would otherwise have been underwater and finance factories with Chinese stonemasons and craftsmen. Rhodes ultimately only harvested the top three inches of the limestone and gave the rest back to the Chinese to build new homes.

Projects that incorporate the salvaged stone work include the fireplace and powder room sink at the Telluride House featured in Western Interiors and Design; the stonework salvaged for the project included a 500-year-old stone threshold "[where the] patinas are just incredible." Rhodes also created Stone Wave at the Tacoma Art Museum in 2003 with 700 pieces of re cut and transported pave stones from the Pearl River Delta in Southern China. According to Rhodes, the stone, "[has]this fantastic texture...you get almost a sheen to the stone from the wear."

== Chronology of work ==
- 2019 Poseidon, Bronze, Gig Harbor, Washington
- 2018 Resolute Arch, Granite, Burning Man Festival, Black Rock City, Nevada
- 2017 Lithic Altars, Granite, Burning Man Festival, Black Rock City, Nevada
- 2016 Connection (Sentinel Series), Granite, Yellowstone Club, Montana
- 2016 Seminar Table (Artist Furniture Series), Granite, Fujian, China
- 2016 Sentinel I and II Bronze, bronze, London, England and Aspen, Colorado
- 2015 Sentinel V, Sandstone, Guemes Island, Washington
- 2015 Sentinel IV, Sandstone, Kona, Hawaii
- 2014 Forest Gathering, Granite and Sandstone, Bainbridge Island, Washington
- 2013 Embrace (Sentinel Series), Granite, Sydney and Perth, Australia
- 2012 Four Abstract Volumes, Quarried Granite Blocks, Palm Desert, California
- 2012 Untitled – Modernist Oven, Granite, Melbourne, Australia
- 2011 Sentinel I (Sentinel Series), Granite and Bronze, Seattle, Washington
- 2011 Sentinel II (Sentinel Series), Granite and Bronze, Woodinville, Washington
- 2010 Earth Tone, Wood and PVC, Burning Man Festival, Black Rock City, Nevada
- 2010 Ignition, Reclaimed Granite, Seattle, Washington
- 2009 Maher Headstone, Reclaimed Granite, Seattle, Washington
- 2008 Westerleigh Residence, Hard Limestone and Granite, Greenwich, California
- 2008 Hillside Ruin, Limestone, Seattle, Washington
- 2008 Untitled – Trough and Ruin, Reclaimed Granite and Limestone, Crested Butte, Colorado
- 2006 Untitled – Woven Screens, Sandstone, Kona, Hawaii
- 2004 Untitled – Stone Wave, Granite, Tacoma, Washington
- 2002 Summer Palace, Granite, Hillsborough, California
- 2002 Untitled – Park Bench, Reclaimed Granite, Redmond, Washington
- 2001 Cross Roads Park – Planned Parenthood, Granite, Seattle, Washington
- 1995 Untitled – Furo, Reclaimed Granite, Redmond, Washington
- 1992 Shadow Box Fire Box, Refractory Brick and Limestone, Highlands, Washington
- 1992 Untitled – Entrance Walls, Basalt, Ephrata, Washington
- 1992 Untitled – Basalt Spray, Basalt, Ephrata, Washington
- 1991 Glasshouse Fireplace, Granite, Seattle Washington
- 1991 Woodland Spring, Basalt, Orcas Island, Washington

== Written works by Richard Rhodes ==
- Doing Business Abroad Raises Ethical Concerns
- Survivor: Trapped in New Orleans During Katrina, I used business skills to get home safely
- Stone Expressions: Stone Expression and Use in the Built Environment, a forthcoming collection of text and photographs exploring the history and practice of stone work
- Stone: Ancient Craft to Modern Mastery, Stone presents the closely kept “Sacred Rules” developed over centuries by the medieval Freemason Guild, previously available only to the initiated.
