= Bruce Conkle =

American installation artist

Bruce Conkle is an American installation artist based in Portland, Oregon. He is noted for his ecological and dystopian fantasy themes. His work is in the collection of the Portland Art Museum and has shown at Nylistasafnio The Living Art Museum in Iceland and A Gentil Carioca in Brazil.

== Works ==
- Burls Will Be Burls (2009), Portland, Oregon
