= Patti Warashina =

American ceramic sculptor (born 1940)

- Born: Masae Patricia Warashina; 1940 (age 85–86); Spokane, Washington
- Movement: Funk art
- Awards: United States Artists Fellow (2018); Smithsonian Visionary Award (2020)
- Website: www.pattiwarashina.com

Patti Warashina (born 1940) is an American artist known for her imaginative ceramic sculptures. Often constructing her sculptures using porcelain, Warashina creates narrative and figurative art. Her works are in the collection of the Museum of Arts and Design, New York, National Museum of Modern Art, Kyoto, and the Smithsonian American Art Museum.

== Early life ==
The youngest of three children, Warashina was born in 1940 and raised in Spokane, Washington. Her father was a dentist, born in Japan, and her mother was Japanese-American. She moved to Seattle to attend the University of Washington, where she studied with sculptors Robert Sperry, Harold Myers, Rudy Autio, Shōji Hamada, Shinsaku Hamada, and Ruth Penington. Warashina earned her Bachelor of Fine Arts in 1962 and her Master of Fine Arts in 1964, both from the University of Washington.

== Career ==
Warashina’s work is often humorous, and includes "clay figures placed in imagined environments that show her subversive thinking." She uses sculpture to explore such themes as the human condition, feminism, car-culture, and political and social topics.

As an art student at the University of Washington in the 1960s, Warashina noticed that the environment in the ceramics studio included a somewhat macho culture; women were not included in technical discussions relating to managing the kiln. She began creating a series of figurative works that used humor to skewer this gender imbalance in the field.

In 1962, Warashina had her first solo exhibition at the Phoenix Art Gallery in Seattle. Warashina's first husband was fellow student Fred Bauer, and from 1964 to 1970 she exhibited as Patti Bauer. In 1976, she married Robert Sperry.

She began teaching in 1964 and has taught at Wisconsin State University, Eastern Michigan University, the Cornish School of Allied Arts, and the University of Washington. During the 1970s and 1980s, Warashina, Sperry, and Howard Kottler ran the ceramics program at the University of Washington's School of Art, growing it into one of the best-known in the United States. Warashina has been associated with the California Funk movement. Her artwork was included in a survey of ceramic Funk Art organized by Arizona State University's Ceramic Research Center in Tempe, Arizona titled, Humor, Irony and Wit: Ceramic Funk from the Sixties and Beyond in 2004.

Warashina has held a number of major solo exhibitions including the retrospective Patti Warashina: Wit and Wisdom at the American Museum of Ceramic Art in Pomona, California in 2012, and at the Bellevue Arts Museum in Bellevue, Washington in 2013.

== Awards and recognition ==
Warashina is nationally recognized for her work. In 1994, she was elected to the American Craft Council's College of Fellows. She received the Twining Humber Lifetime Achievement/Woman of the Year Award in 2001 from Seattle's Artist Trust and earned the University of Washington Division of the Arts Distinguished Alumna Award in 2003.

In 2005, Warashina was interviewed for Smithsonian's Archives of American Art which also holds a number of her papers in its collection.

United States Artists awarded Warashina a 2018 USA Fellowship.

In October 2020, Warashina won the Visionary Award from the Smithsonian Craft Show.

== Works ==
- City Reflections (2009), Portland, Oregon

== Grants ==
- 1975: National Endowment for the Arts
- 1978: Ford Foundation
