= 1985 in art =

Events from the year 1985 in art.

== Events ==
- Charles Saatchi's collection opens to the public, arousing interest in Neo-expressionism.
- Germano Celant publishes Arte Povekira: Storie e protagonisti.
- Art gallerist Andrew Crispo and the Solomon R. Guggenheim Museum are involved in a dispute over Constantin Brâncuși's 1912 sculpture "The Muse" which ends in the museum paying $2 million US for the artwork, at the time believed to be the most ever paid for a 20th century sculpture.
- October 17 – A fire at the Huntington Library (California) destroys Joshua Reynolds's 1777 portrait of Mrs. Edwin Lascelles.

== Awards ==
- Archibald Prize: Guy Warren – Flugelman with Wingman
- John Moores Painting Prize - Bruce McLean for "Oriental Garden Kyoto
- Turner Prize – Howard Hodgkin

Shortlisted were: Terry Atkinson, Tony Cragg, Ian Hamilton Finlay, Milena Kalinovska and John Walker.

== Works ==
- Mai Dantsig – And the Saved World Remembers
- Robyn Denny – Coloured lines at Embankment tube station in London, England
- Christo and Jeanne Claude - "The Pont Neuf Wrapped" at the Pont Neuf in Paris, France
- Thomas Morandi – Yankee Champion (sculpture, Portland, Oregon)
- Odd Nerdrum – The Cloud (Skyen)
- George Rickey – Double L Excentric Gyratory (sculpture)
- Sally Robinson (Australian) – Kakadu (screen print)
- Wayne Thiebaud – Sunset Streets
- Andy Warhol – Reigning Queens series

== Births ==
- September 24 – Eric Adjetey Anang, Ghanaian sculptor
- date unknown
  - Lawrence Abu Hamdan, Jordanian-born artist
  - Helen Marten, English sculptor and installation artist

== Deaths ==
- 8 January – Grace Morley, American-born curator (b. 1900)
- 18 January – Anwar Shemza, Pakistan-born British artist and writer (b. 1928)
- 7 March – Jessie Oonark, Canadian Inuk artist (b. 1906)
- 28 March – Marc Chagall, Russian-Belarusian-French painter (b. 1887)
- 21 April – Rudi Gernreich, Austrian American fashion designer (b. 1922)
- 11 May – Chester Gould, American cartoonist (b. 1900)
- 12 May – Jean Dubuffet, French painter and sculptor (b. 1901)
- 22 May – Wolfgang Reitherman, German-American animator (b. 1909)
- 26 July – Grace Albee, American printmaker (b. 1890)
- 21 August – David Olère, Polish-born Jewish French painter (b. 1902)
- 8 September – Ana Mendieta, Cuban American performance artist, sculptor, painter and video artist
- 28 September – André Kertész, Hungarian-born photographer (b. 1894)
- 17 November – Richard Amsel, American illustrator and graphic designer (b. 1947)
- 8 December – Paul Kelpe, German-born American painter (b. 1902)
- unknown dates
  - Ovartaci, Danish outsider artist (b. 1894)
  - Antonio Rodríguez Luna, Spanish painter (b. 1910)

== See also ==
- 1985 in fine arts of the Soviet Union
