= 1978 in art =

Events from the year 1978 in art.

== Events ==
- 27 June – Stitching the Standard by Edmund Leighton is sold at Sotheby's in Belgravia to a private collector.

== Awards ==
- Archibald Prize: Brett Whiteley – Art, Life and the other thing
- John Moores Painting Prize - Noel Forster for "A painting in six stages with a silk triangle"

== Works ==
- Vacant Lot of Cabbages 4 January - 21 June Wellington New Zealand.
- Zdzisław Beksiński – AA78
- Christo and Jeanne Claude - "Wrapped Walk Ways" in Loose Park in Kansas City, Missouri
- Dan Flavin – untitled (to the real Dan Hill)
- Helen Frankenthaler – Cleveland Symphony Orchestra
- David Gentleman – "Eleanor cross" mural for Charing Cross tube station (London)
- Jack Goldstein – The Jump
- Michael Heizer – Isolated Mass/Circumflex (Number 2) (land art, Houston, Texas)
- Bryan Hunt – Big Twist (bronze, Houston, Texas)
- Nabil Kanso – Hiroshima Nagasaki One-Minute
- Liz Leyh – Concrete Cows (Milton Keynes)
- Odd Nerdrum – The Murder of Andreas Baader
- Dennis Oppenheim – Cobalt Vectors – An Invasion
- Mikhail Savitsky – Partisan Madonna of Minsk

== Births ==
- 19 September – Mykhailo Kolodko, Ukrainian/Hungarian sculptor

== Deaths ==
- 10 January – Gluck, born Hannah Gluckstein, English painter (b. 1895)
- 19 January – Živko Stojsavljević, Serbian painter (b. 1900).
- 1 February – Don Freeman, American author, painter and illustrator (b. 1908)
- 24 February – Alma Thomas, African American abstract expressionist painter (b. 1891).
- 13 April – Jack Chambers, Canadian artist and filmmaker (b. 1931).
- 27 April – Ralston Crawford, Canadian-born American painter, lithographer and photographer (b. 1906)
- 29 April – Yukihiko Yasuda, Japanese painter (b. 1884).
- 8 May – Duncan Grant, Scottish painter (b. 1885).
- 21 May – Jo Spier, Dutch artist and illustrator (b. 1900)
- 31 May – Hannah Höch, German Dada photomontage artist (b. 1889).
- 13 July
  - Thomas B. Hess, American art editor, writer, and curator (b. 1920)
  - Oliver Messel, English-born stage designer (b. 1904).
- 5 August – Victor Hasselblad, Swedish inventor and photographer (b. 1889).
- 14 August – Nicolas Bentley, British author and illustrator (b. 1907).
- 27 August – Gordon Matta-Clark, American artist (b. 1943).
- 6 November – Harry Bertoia, Italian-born American artist and designer (b. 1915).
- 8 November – Norman Rockwell, American painter and illustrator (b. 1894).
- 20 November – Giorgio de Chirico, Greek-Italian painter (b. 1888)
- 30 November – Otto Kallir, Austrian -American art historian, author, publisher, and gallerist (b. 1894)

=== Full date unknown ===
- Gabriel Hayes, Irish sculptor and coin designer (b.1909).
- Leo Michelson, Latvian-American painter and sculptor (b.1887).

== See also ==
- 1978 in fine arts of the Soviet Union
