= Sistine Madonna =

Painting by Raphael

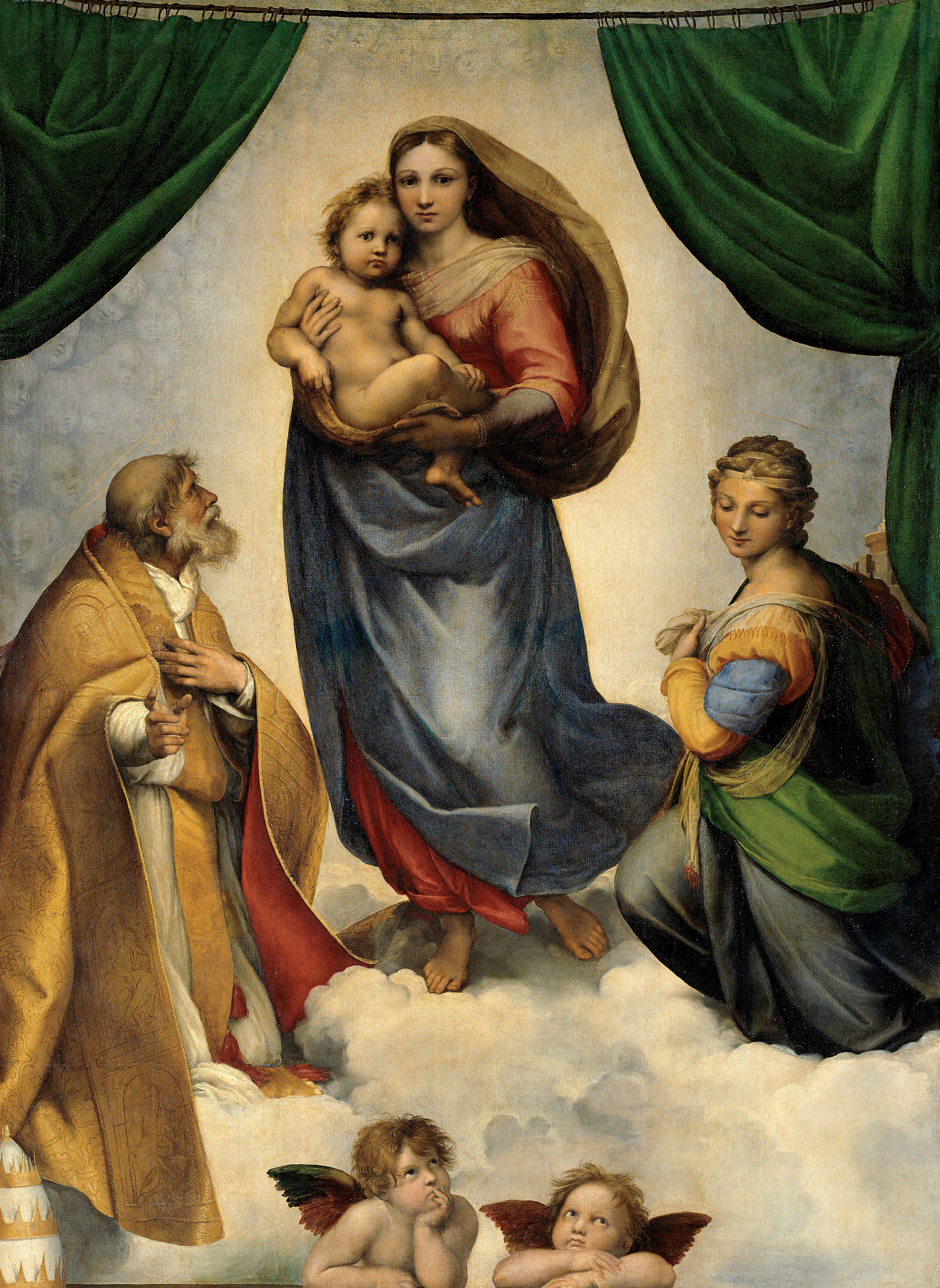
- Artist: Raphael
- Year: c. 1513–1514
- Medium: Oil on canvas
- Dimensions: 265 cm × 196 cm (104 in × 77 in)
- Location: Gemäldegalerie Alte Meister, Dresden

The Sistine Madonna, also called the Madonna di San Sisto, is an oil painting by the Italian artist Raphael. The painting was commissioned in 1512 by Pope Julius II for the church of San Sisto, Piacenza, and probably executed c. 1513–1514. The canvas was one of the last Madonnas painted by Raphael. Giorgio Vasari called it "a truly rare and extraordinary work".

The painting was moved to Dresden in 1754 and is well known for its influence in the German and Russian art scene. After World War II, it was relocated to Moscow for a decade before being returned to Dresden, where it remains.

== Composition ==
The oil on canvas painting measures 265 cm by 196 cm. In the painting the Madonna, holding Christ Child and flanked by Saint Sixtus and Saint Barbara, stands on clouds before dozens of obscured putti, while two distinctive winged putti rest on their elbows beneath her.

== Painting materials ==
Pigment analysis of the painting reveals the usual pigments of the Renaissance period, such as malachite mixed with orpiment in the green drapery on top of the painting, natural ultramarine mixed with lead white in the blue robe of Madonna, and a mixture of lead-tin-yellow, vermilion, and lead white in the yellow sleeve of St Barbara.

== History ==
The painting was commissioned by Pope Julius II in honor of his late uncle, Pope Sixtus IV, as an altarpiece for the basilica church of the Benedictine Monastery of San Sisto in Piacenza, with which the Rovere family had a long-standing relationship. The commission required that the painting depict both Saints Sixtus and Barbara. Legend has it that when Antonio da Correggio first laid eyes on the piece, he was inspired to cry, "And I also, I am a painter!"

=== Relocation to Germany ===
In 1754, Augustus III of Poland purchased the painting for 110,000 – 120,000 francs, whereupon it was relocated to Dresden and achieved new prominence; this was to remain the highest price paid for any painting for many decades. In The Invisible Masterpiece, Hans Belting describes the influence the painting has had in Germany:

Like no other work of art, Raphael's Sistine Madonna in Dresden has fired the Germans' imagination, uniting or dividing them in the debate about art and religion.... Over and again, this painting has been hailed as 'supreme among the world's paintings' and accorded the epithet 'divine', not least because it presents a divine child as the highest ideal of art.

If the stories are correct, the painting achieved its prominence immediately, as it is said that Augustus moved his throne in order to better display it. The Sistine Madonna was notably celebrated by Johann Joachim Winckelmann in his popular and influential Geschichte der Kunst des Alterthums (1764), positioning the painting firmly in the public view and in the center of a debate about the relative prominence of its Classical and Christian elements. Alternately portraying Raphael as a "devout Christian" and a "'divine' Pagan" (with his distinctly un-Protestant Mary who could have as easily been Juno), the Germans implicitly tied the image into a legend of their own, "Raphael's Dream." Arising in the last decades of the 18th century, the legend—which made its way into a number of stories and even a play—presents Raphael as receiving a heavenly vision that enabled him to present his divine Madonna. It is claimed the painting has stirred many viewers, and that at the sight of the canvas some were transfixed to a state of religious ecstasy akin to Stendhal Syndrome (including one of Freud's patients). This nearly miraculous power of the painting made it an icon of 19th-century German Romanticism. The picture influenced Goethe, Wagner and Nietzsche According to Dostoyevsky, the painting was "the greatest revelation of the human spirit". Legend has it that during the abortive Dresden uprising of May 1849 Mikhail Bakunin "(unsuccessfully) counseled the revolutionary government to remove Raphael's Sistine Madonna from The Gemäldegalerie, and to hang it on the barricades at the entrance to the city, on the grounds that the Prussians were too cultured 'to dare to fire on a Raphael.'" The story was invoked by the Situationist International as "a demonstration of how the art of the past might be utilized in the present." In 1855, the "Neues Königliches Museum" (New Royal Museum) opened in a building designed by Gottfried Semper, and the Sistine Madonna was given a room of its own.

=== World War II and Soviet possession ===
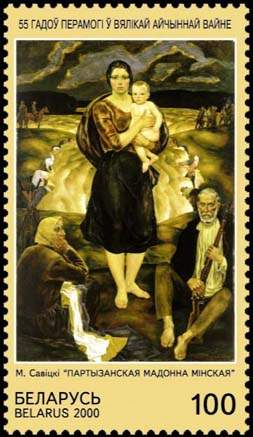
Sistine Madonna-inspired Partisan Madonna of Minsk by Mikhail Savitsky on a Belarusian postage stamp.

Sistine Madonna was rescued from destruction during the bombing of Dresden in World War II, but the conditions in which it was saved and the subsequent history of the piece are themselves the subject of controversy. The painting was stored, with other works of art, in a tunnel in Saxon Switzerland; when the Red Army encountered them, it took them. The painting was temporarily removed to Pillnitz, from which it was transported in a box on a tented flatcar to Moscow. There, sight of the Madonna brought Soviet leading art official Mikhail Khrapchenko to declare that the Pushkin Museum would now be able to claim a place among the great museums of the world.

In 1946, the painting went temporarily on restricted exhibition in the Pushkin, along with some of the other treasures the Soviets had retrieved. But in 1955, after the death of Joseph Stalin, the Soviets decided to return the art to Germany, "for the purpose of strengthening and furthering the progress of friendship between the Soviet and German peoples." There followed some international controversy, with press around the world stating that the Dresden art collection had been damaged in Soviet storage. Soviets countered that they had in fact saved the pieces. The tunnel in which the art was stored in Saxon Switzerland was climate controlled, but according to a Soviet military spokesperson, the power had failed when the collection was discovered and the pieces were exposed to the humid conditions of the underground. Soviet paintings Partisan Madonna of Minsk by Mikhail Savitsky and And the Saved World Remembers by Mai Dantsig are based on the Sistine Madonna.

Stories of the horrid conditions from which the Sistine Madonna had been saved began to circulate. But, as reported by ARTnews in 1991, Russian art historian Andrei Chegodaev, who had been sent by the Soviets to Germany in 1945 to review the art, denied it:

It was the most insolent, bold-faced lie... In some gloomy, dark cave, two [actually four] soldiers, knee-deep in water, are carrying the Sistine Madonna upright, slung on cloths, very easily, barely using two fingers. But it couldn’t have been lifted like this even by a dozen healthy fellows ... because it was framed.... Everything connected with this imaginary rescue is simply a lie.

ARTnews also indicated that the commander of the brigade that retrieved the Madonna also described the stories as "a lie", in a letter to Literaturnaya Gazeta published in the 1950s, indicating that "in reality, the ‘Sistine Madonna,’ like some other pictures, ...was in a dry tunnel, where there were various instruments that monitored humidity, temperature, etc." But, whether true or not, the stories had found foothold in public imagination and have been recorded as fact in a number of books.

== Contemporary display ==
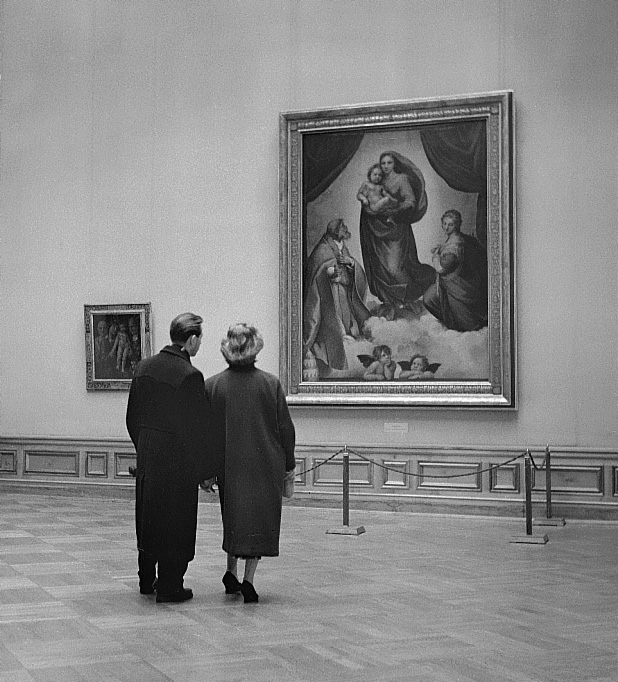
On display in the Gemäldegalerie, around 1970

After its return to Germany, the painting was restored to display in the Gemäldegalerie Alte Meister, where guidebooks single it out in the collection, variously describing it as the "most famous", the "top", the "showpiece", and "the collection's highlight". From 26 May to 26 August 2012, the Dresden gallery celebrated the 500th anniversary of the painting.

== Putti ==
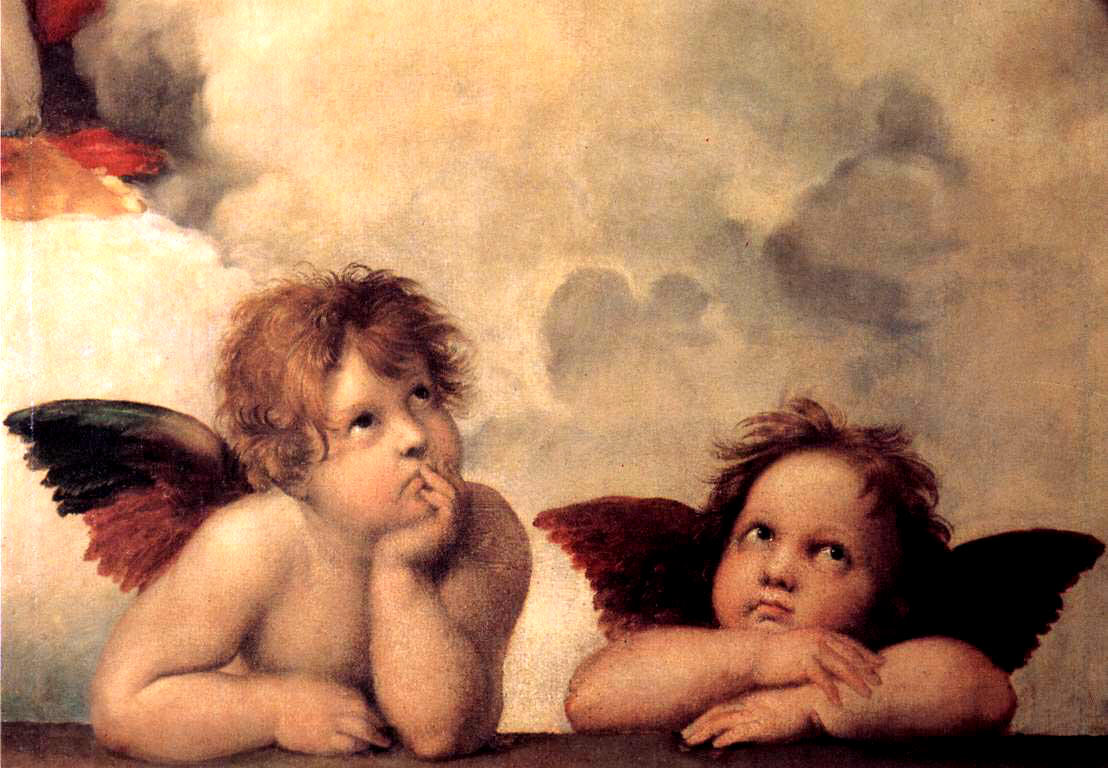
Detail, Sistine Madonna

A prominent element within the painting, the winged angels beneath Mary are famous in their own right. The angels of this nature are known as putti, and are commonly conflated with cherubim. As early as 1913 Gustav Kobbé that "no cherub or group of cherubs is so famous as the two that lean on the altar top indicated at the very bottom of the picture." Heavily marketed, they have been featured in stamps, postcards, T-shirts, socks, and wrapping paper. These putti have inspired legends of their own. According to a 1912 article in Fra Magazine, when Raphael was painting the Madonna the children of his model would come in to watch. Struck by their posture as they did, the story goes, he added them to the painting exactly as he saw them. Another story, recounted in 1912 in St. Nicholas Magazine, says that Raphael was inspired by two children he encountered on the street when he saw them "looking wistfully into the window of a baker's shop."

== See also ==
- List of paintings by Raphael
