= And the Saved World Remembers =

Painting by Mai Dantsig

- Artist: Mai Dantsig
- Year: 1985
- Medium: Oil on canvas
- Dimensions: 3.75 m × 7 m (148 in × 280 in)
- Location: Private collection (Art Russe)

And the Saved World Remembers is a monumental painting by Belarusian artist Mai Dantsig measuring 3.75 m × 7 m (148 in × 276 in) and based on the Sistine Madonna by Raphael Sanzio. Dantsig was inspired by the salvage of the Sistine Madonna from the bombing of Dresden during World War II. And the Saved World Remembers depicts the moment when the Sistine Madonna was retrieved by the Soviets. The background shows an army, the left side depicts a postman delivering news of victory amid ruined cities and the right side shows German soldiers among concentration camps. The painting also shows women lamenting their dead and a mine detector. Dantsig spent over ten years working on the painting and completed it in 1985, during the 40th anniversary of the end of World War II in Europe.

In 2015, And the Saved World Remembers was exhibited in the Saatchi Gallery in London.

== See also ==
- Partisan Madonna of Minsk
- Art and World War II
