= Two Lines Up Excentric Variation VI =

Sculpture in Columbus, Ohio, U.S.

- The sculpture in 2018
- Artist: George Rickey
- Year: 1977
- Medium: Stainless steel sculpture
- Location: Columbus Museum of Art, Columbus, Ohio, United States
- 39°57′53.1″N 82°59′15.7″W

Two Lines Up Excentric Variation VI is a 1977 stainless steel sculpture by George Rickey, installed outside the Columbus Museum of Art in Columbus, Ohio, United States. The abstract, kinetic sculpture was donated by the family of the Albert Fullerton Miller.

== See also ==
- 1977 in art
