= 1985 in fine arts of the Soviet Union =

Monument to Lenin
- Artist: Lev Kerbel
- Year: 1985
- Location: Kaluzhskaya Square; Moscow

The year 1985 was marked by many events that left an imprint on the history of Soviet and Russian Fine Arts.

== Events ==
- Traditional Exhibition of works of Leningrad artists - the Great Patriotic War veterans was opened in the Leningrad Union of Artists on the eve of Victory Day (9 May). The participants were Piotr Alberti, Ivan Andreev, Vladimir Chekalov, Evgeny Chuprun, Mikhail Grachev, Alexei Eriomin, Mikhail Kaneev, Yuri Khukhrov, Maya Kopitseva, Elena Kostenko, Nikolai Kostrov, Anna Kostrova, Gevork Kotiantz, Mikhail Kozell, Boris Lavrenko, Dmitry Maevsky, Gavriil Malish, Evsey Moiseenko, Nikolai Mukho, Piotr Nazarov, Anatoli Nenartovich, Yuri Neprintsev, Dmitry Oboznenko, Sergei Osipov, Vladimir Ovchinnikov, Evgeny Pozdniakov, Gleb Savinov, Alexander Shmidt, German Tatarinov, Nikolai Timkov, Ivan Varichev, Anatoli Vasiliev, Piotr Vasiliev, Rostislav Vovkushevsky, Vecheslav Zagonek, Ruben Zakharian, and other important Leningrad artists.
- Exhibition of works by Gevork Kotiantz was opened in the Exhibition Halls of the Union of Artists of Russian Federation in Moscow.
- A Monument to Vladimir Lenin was unveiled in Moscow on the Kaluzhskaya Square. Authors of the monument sculptor Lev Kerbel.
- Exhibition of works by Victor Oreshnikov was opened in the Museum of the Academy of Arts in Leningrad.
- Exhibition of works by Mikhail Trufanov was opened in the Museum of the Academy of Arts in Leningrad.
- XVth exhibition of young Moscow artists has opened in the house of the artist at the Kuznetsk bridge. The participants were Akimov Ivan, Alimov Dmitry, Birshtein Anna, Braynin Vladimir, Vasnetsov Fedor, Vatagin Nikolay, Gansovskaya Ilona, Glukhova Irina, Julia Dolgorukova (Zhudro), Kalinina Irina, Kozlenko Nikolas, Kozorezenko Peter, Krasavin Alexey, Nazarenko Tatyana, Popov Alexandr, Tabenkin Lev and other important Moscow artists.

== Deaths ==
- February 21 — Boris Kharchenko (Russian: Борис Дмитриевич Харченко), Russian soviet painter and art educator (born 1927).
- March 28 — Marc Chagall (Russian: Марк Захарович Шагал), Russian painter and graphic artist, who since 1923 lived in France (born 1887).
- April 26 — Pavel Kondratiev (Russian: Кондратьев Павел Михайлович), Russian soviet painter and graphic artist (born 1902).
- August 31 — Vasily Golubev (Russian: Голубев Василий Васильевич), Russian soviet painter (born 1925).
- September 4 — Gennady Epifanov (Russian: Епифанов Геннадий Дмитриевич), Russian soviet graphic artist, Honored Art worker of the Russian Federation (born 1900).
- September 11 — Vecheslav Fyodorov (Russian: Фёдоров Вячеслав Андреевич), Russian soviet painter, Honored Artist of the RSFSR (born 1918).
- October 12 — Sergei Osipov (Russian: Серге́й Иванович Осипов), Russian soviet painter and art educator (born 1915).

=== Full date unknown ===
- Irakly Toidze (Russian: Тоидзе Ираклий Моисеевич), Georgian soviet painter and graphic artist, Honored Art worker of the Russian Federation, Stalin Prize winner, author of worldwide known poster of 1941 named «The Motherland Calls!» (Russian: Родина-мать зовёт! Rodina Mat Zovyot!) (born 1902).
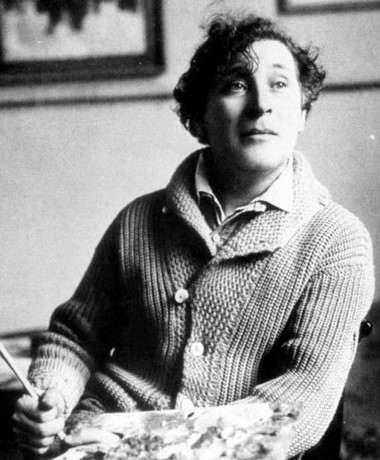
Marc Chagall

== See also ==
- List of Russian artists
- List of painters of Leningrad Union of Artists
- Saint Petersburg Union of Artists
- Russian culture

== Sources ==
- Выставка произведений ленинградских художников - ветеранов Великой Отечественной войны. Каталог. Л., Художник РСФСР, 1985.
- "Ради жизни на Земле. 40 лет Великой Победы". Выставка произведений. Живопись. Скульптура. Графика. Декоративно-прикладное и народное искусство. Л., Государственный Русский музей, 1985.
- Всероссийская художественная выставка "Мир отстояли - мир сохраним". Каталог. М., Министерство культуры, 1985.
- Художники Ленинграда в борьбе за мир. Каталог выставки. Л., Художник РСФСР, 1985.
- Наталия Виссарионовна Смирнова. Выставка произведений. Каталог. Л., Художник РСФСР, 1984.
- Виктор Михайлович Орешников. Каталог выставки. Живопись. М., Изобразительное искусство, 1985.РСФСР, 1985.
- Геворк Вартанович Котьянц. Живопись. Графика. Каталог выставки. М., Советский художник, 1985.
- Рахина Валентина Ивановна. Выставка произведений. Каталог. Л., Художник РСФСР, 1985.
- Валерий Владимирович Ватенин. Выставка произведений. Каталог. Л., Художник РСФСР, 1985.
- Виталий Иванович Тюленев. Выставка произведений. Каталог. Л., Художник РСФСР, 1985.
- 40 лет Победы советского народа в Великой Отечественной войне 1941-1945 годов. Дипломные работы выпускников института живописи, скульптуры и архитектуры имени И. Е. Репина и государственного художественного института имени В. И. Сурикова. Каталог. Л., Художник РСФСР, 1985.
- Самуил Григорьевич Невельштейн. Выставка произведений. Каталог. М., Советский художник, 1985.
- Михаил Павлович Труфанов. Каталог выставки. М., Изобразительное искусство, 1985.
- Artists of Peoples of the USSR. Biobibliography Dictionary. Vol. 1. Moscow, Iskusstvo, 1970.
- Artists of Peoples of the USSR. Biobibliography Dictionary. Vol. 2. Moscow, Iskusstvo, 1972.
- Directory of Members of Union of Artists of USSR. Volume 1,2. Moscow, Soviet Artist Edition, 1979.
- Directory of Members of the Leningrad branch of the Union of Artists of Russian Federation. Leningrad, Khudozhnik RSFSR, 1980.
- Artists of Peoples of the USSR. Biobibliography Dictionary. Vol. 4 Book 1. Moscow, Iskusstvo, 1983.
- Directory of Members of the Leningrad branch of the Union of Artists of Russian Federation. - Leningrad: Khudozhnik RSFSR, 1987.
- Artists of peoples of the USSR. Biobibliography Dictionary. Vol. 4 Book 2. - Saint Petersburg: Academic project humanitarian agency, 1995.
- Link of Times: 1932 - 1997. Artists - Members of Saint Petersburg Union of Artists of Russia. Exhibition catalogue. - Saint Petersburg: Manezh Central Exhibition Hall, 1997.
- Matthew C. Bown. Dictionary of 20th Century Russian and Soviet Painters 1900-1980s. - London: Izomar, 1998.
- Vern G. Swanson. Soviet Impressionism. - Woodbridge, England: Antique Collectors' Club, 2001.
- Петр Фомин. Живопись. Воспоминания современников. СПб., 2002. С.107.
- Время перемен. Искусство 1960—1985 в Советском Союзе. СПб., Государственный Русский музей, 2006.
- Sergei V. Ivanov. Unknown Socialist Realism. The Leningrad School. - Saint-Petersburg: NP-Print Edition, 2007. - ISBN 5-901724-21-6, ISBN 978-5-901724-21-7.
- Anniversary Directory graduates of Saint Petersburg State Academic Institute of Painting, Sculpture, and Architecture named after Ilya Repin, Russian Academy of Arts. 1915 - 2005. - Saint Petersburg: Pervotsvet Publishing House, 2007.
