= Big Twist =

1978 sculpture by Bryan Hunt inTexas, US

- Artist: Bryan Hunt
- Year: 1978
- Type: Sculpture
- Medium: Bronze
- Location: Museum of Fine Arts, Houston; Houston, Texas, United States; 29.7265°N 95.3906°W

Big Twist is an outdoor 1978 bronze sculpture by American artist Bryan Hunt, installed at the Museum of Fine Arts, Houston's Lillie and Hugh Roy Cullen Sculpture Garden, in the U.S. state of Texas.

== See also ==
- 1978 in art
- List of public art in Houston
