= Double L Excentric Gyratory =

Sculpture by George Rickey

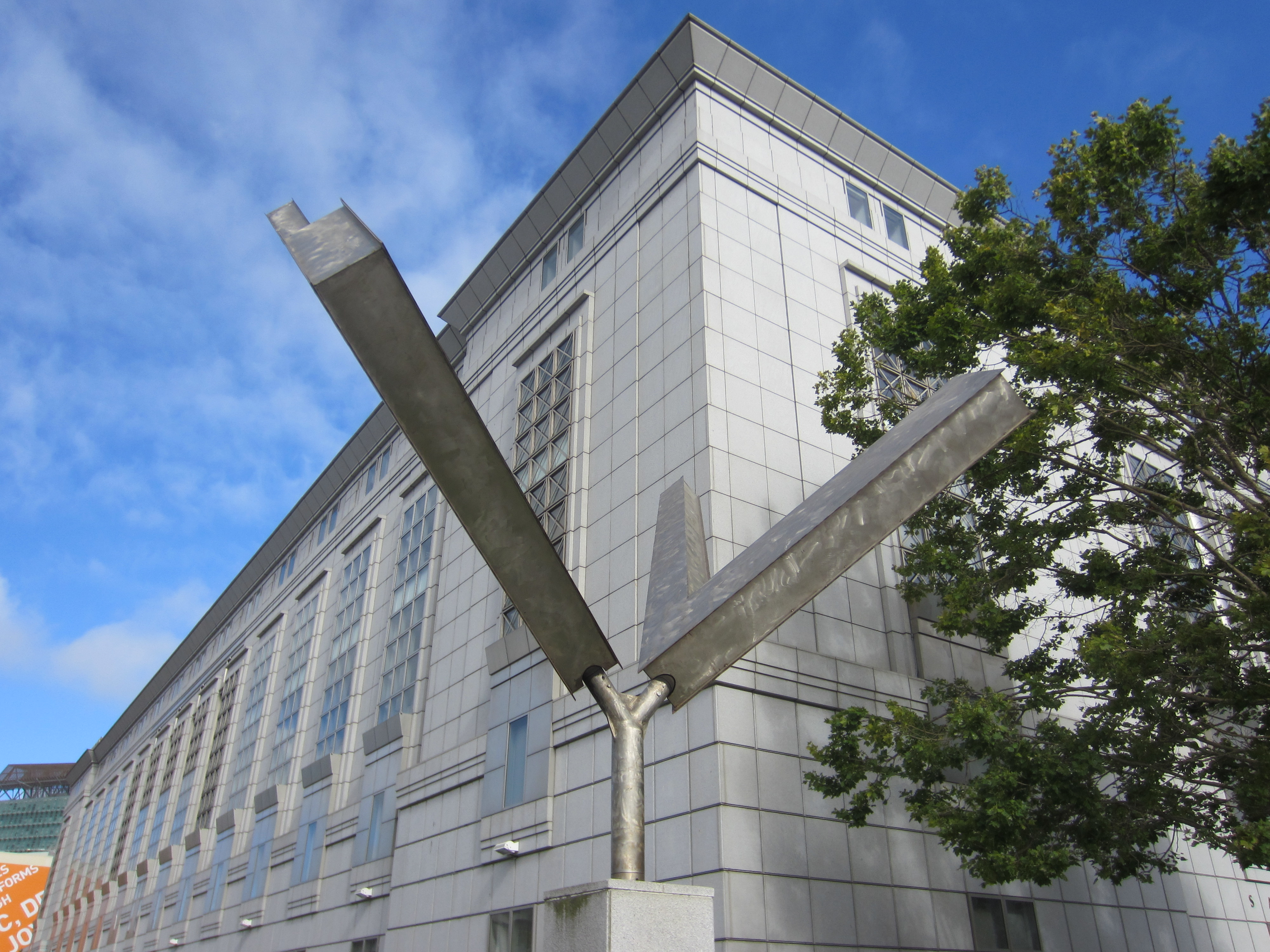
- The sculpture in 2013
- Artist: George Rickey
- Location: San Francisco, California, U.S.

Double L Excentric Gyratory is a sculpture by American artist George Rickey. There are three editions. One is installed at the intersection of Larkin and Fulton streets, outside the Main Library, in San Francisco's Civic Center, in the U.S. state of California. Another is part of the Auckland Art Gallery's International Art Collection. This stainless steel sculpture, dated 1985, measures 7163 x 3543 mm and was gifted by the Edmiston Trust. The plaque in San Francisco acknowledges the contribution of Carl Djerassi.

== Gallery ==
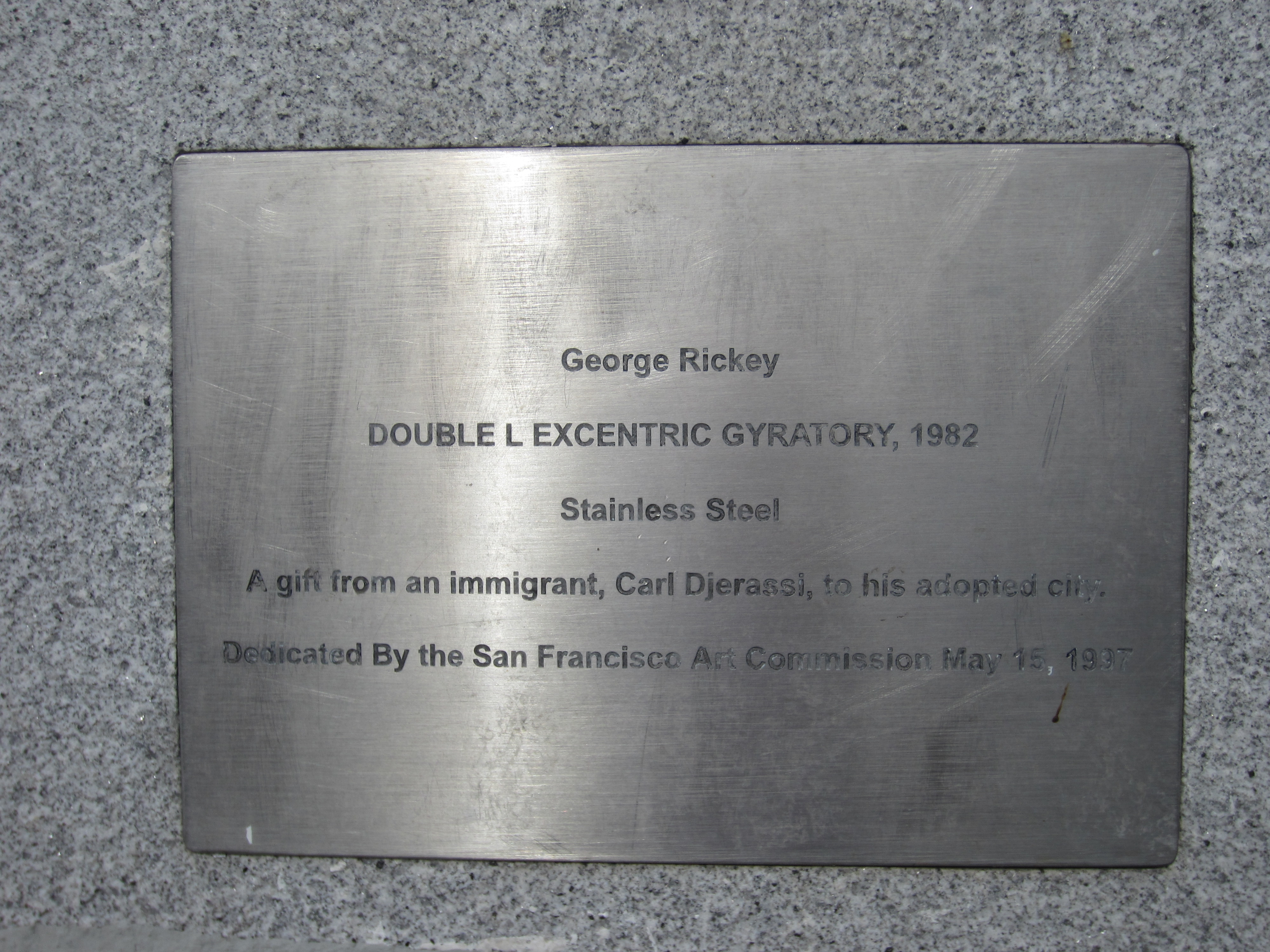
Plaque for the sculpture in San Francisco

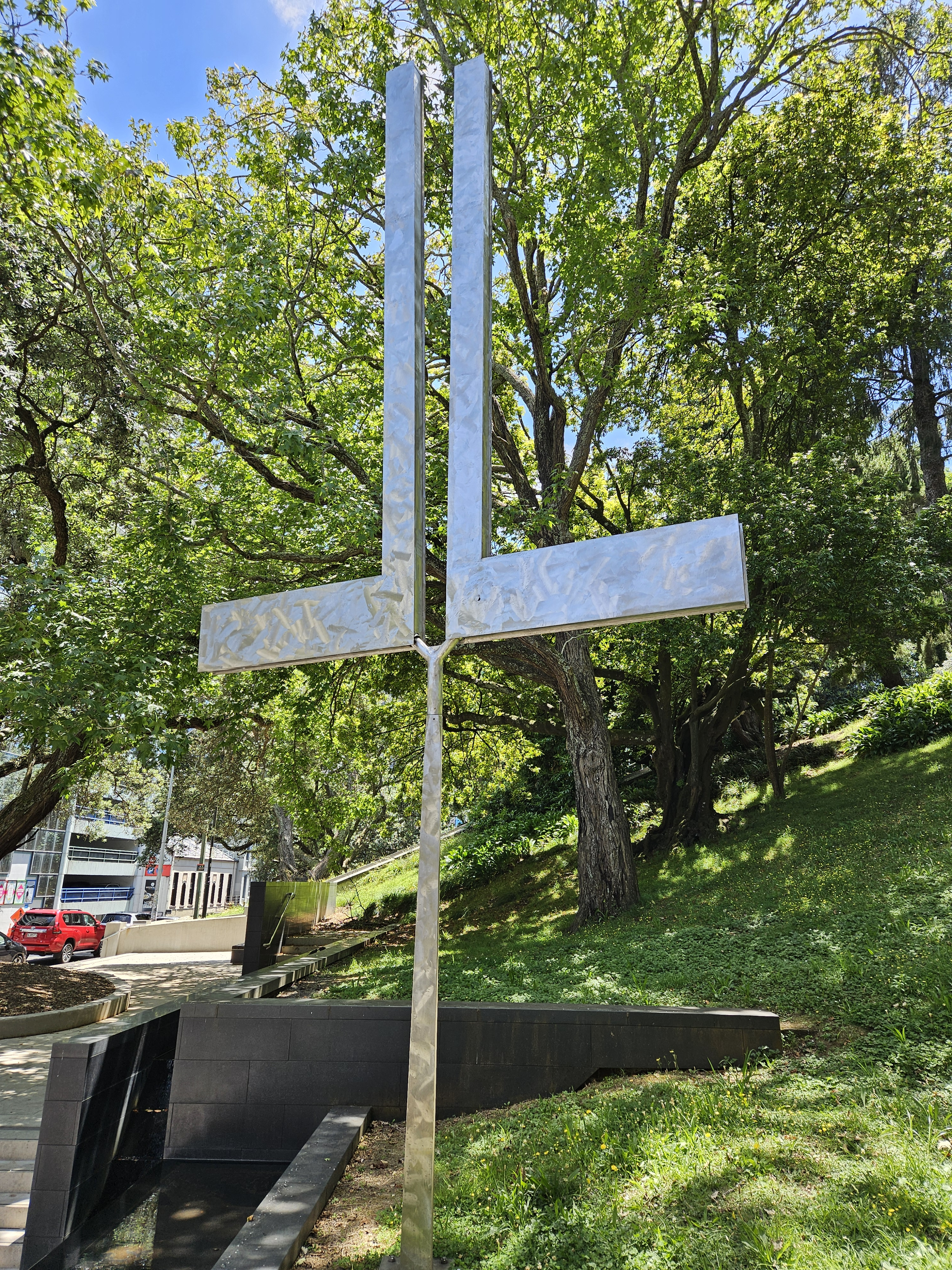
Sculpture in Auckland

== See also ==
- 1985 in art
