= Yankee Champion =

Sculpture in Portland, Oregon

- The sculpture in 2015
- Artist: Thomas Morandi
- Year: 1985
- Type: Sculpture
- Medium: Stainless steel
- Dimensions: 36 cm × 33 cm × 33 cm (14 in × 13 in × 13 in)
- Condition: "Well maintained" (1993)
- Location: Portland, Oregon, United States
- Owner: University of Portland's Art Department

Yankee Champion is an outdoor 1985 stainless steel sculpture by Thomas Morandi, located on the Portland State University campus in downtown Portland, Oregon, in the United States.

== Description and history ==
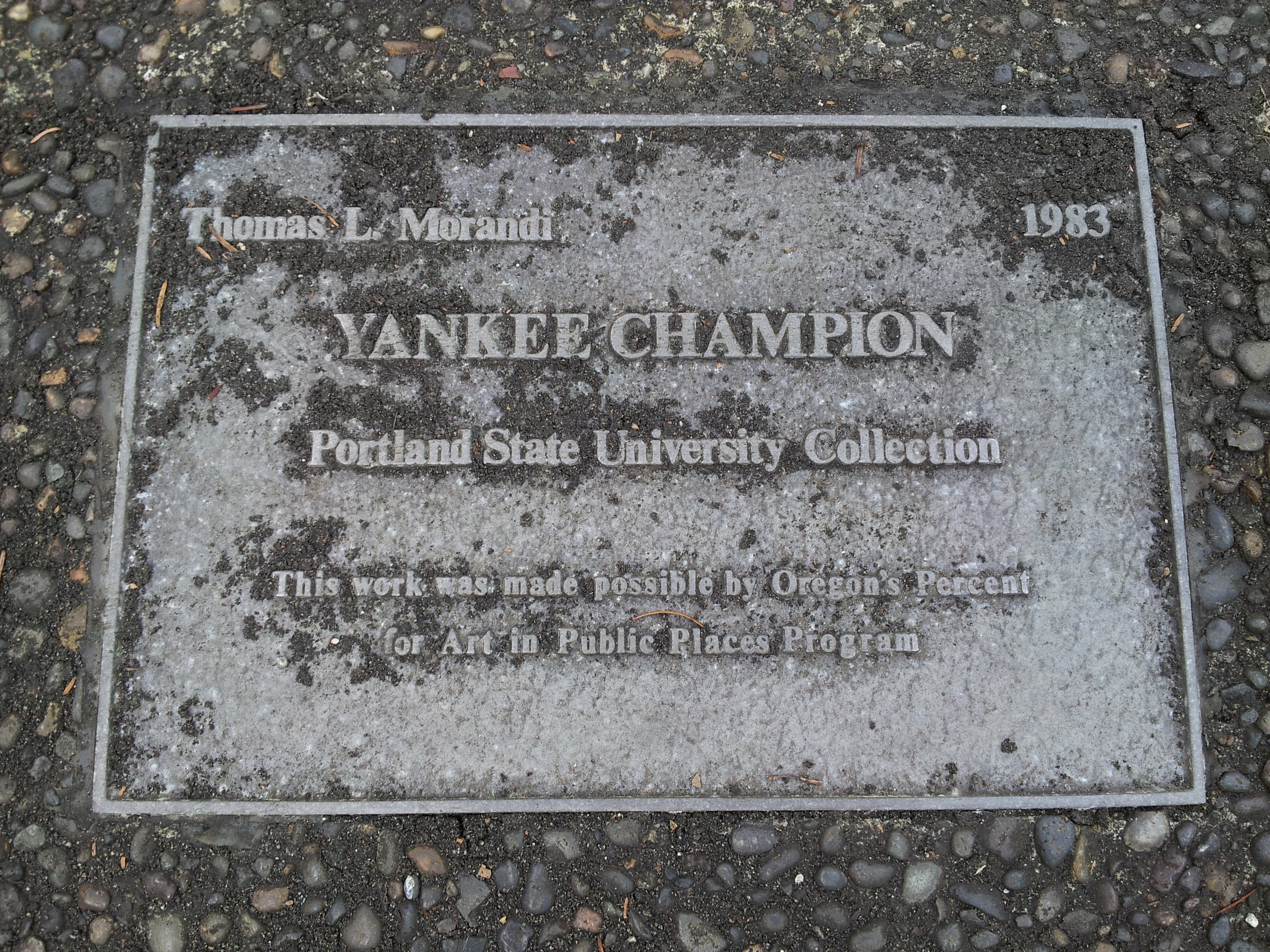
Plaque for the sculpture

Yankee Champion is a welded stainless steel sculpture with an aggregate concrete base by Thomas Morandi, located at the southeast corner of Southwest Broadway and Montgomery Street on the Portland State University campus. Described as a "conglomerate of shapes supported by three irregularly shaped legs", the piece measures approximately 14 feet (4.3 m) tall x 13 feet (4.0 m) long x 13 feet (4.0 m) wide and weighs 1.5 tons. Morandi worked on Yankee Champion from 1983 to 1985. It was commissioned by the Oregon Percent for Art in Public Places Program in 1984 at a cost of $29,000, and was dedicated on October 24, 1985. Nitric acid was applied to its finished surface to prevent white scaling. A plaque below the sculpture contains the inscription:

Thomas L. Morandi 1983 / Yankee Champion / Portland State University Collection / This work was made possible by Oregon's Percent / For Art in Public Places Program.

According to the Smithsonian Institution, which categorizes the sculpture as abstract, "responsibility" for Yankee Champion is shared with Portland State University's Art Department by Facilities Management. The university's Art Department is also listed as the work's owner. It was surveyed and deemed "well maintained" by Smithsonian's "Save Outdoor Sculpture!" program in September 1993.

The sculpture is installed at the intersection of Southwest 11th and Market, as of 2018.

== See also ==
- 1985 in art
