= Bryan Hunt =

American sculptor

Bryan Hunt is an American sculptor who was born in Terre Haute, Indiana on June 7, 1947. His family moved to Tampa, Florida in 1955. He worked at the Kennedy Space Center as an engineer's aide and draftsman, 1967–1968, during the NASA Apollo Program. In 1968, he moved to Los Angeles to enroll in the Otis Art Institute, where he received a BFA in 1971.

== Career overview ==
Hunt traveled to New York City and attended the Whitney Museum of American Art Independent Study Program in 1972. Hunt returned to Venice, California until 1976 when he moved to New York. In California, he had his first solo exhibition at Jack Glenn Gallery in Newport Beach in 1975, and soon after at the Clocktower in New York City. Hunt's first solo show in Europe, organized by artist James Lee Byars, was Empire State, Phobos, Universal Joint at the Palais des Beaux Arts in Brussels. In 1978 Hunt was included in the Solomon R. Guggenheim Museum's "Young American Artists." Hunt's work Big Twist was installed in the Museum of Modern Art's Sculpture Garden in 1978; it was later loaned to the White House for a temporary installation in the Rose Garden, at the request of First Lady Hillary Clinton. Hunt's first commissioned sculpture was in 1979 when Edgar Kaufmann, Jr. asked him to create a sculpture for Frank Lloyd Wright's famous Fallingwater House, or the Kaufmann House, in Western Pennsylvania. He was in the Whitney Museum Biennials in 1979, 1981, and 1985, and was featured at the 1980 Venice Biennale. Hunt was represented by Blum-Helman Gallery in New York from 1978 to 1991.

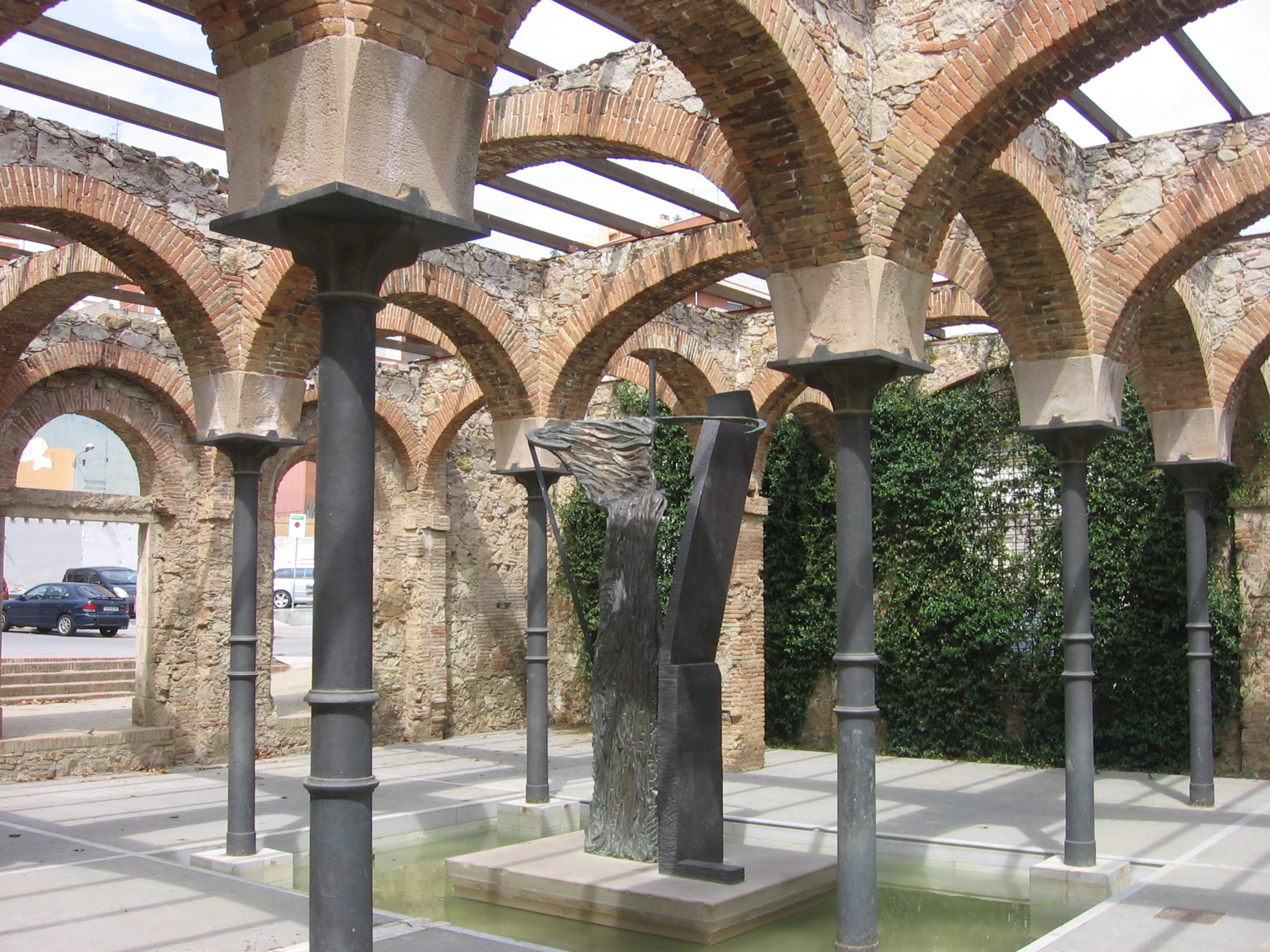
Sculpture Rites of Spring in Barcelona

The City of Barcelona, Spain commissioned the sculpture Rites of Spring in 1985. It is installed in the public park of the El Clot neighborhood. He lived part-time in Spain from 1985 to 1991 in his home in Mojacar, near Almeria. In 1992 FallLakeFalls, a public artwork, was installed at the Mori building, Shiroyama Trust Tower in Minato, Tokyo, Japan. Los Angeles philanthropist Eli Broad donated Hunt's Empire State Building to the Whitney Museum of Art, and it was included in the museum's Centennial exhibition (1900–2000) with about 70 other significant artworks.

In 2006, the New York City Parks Department commissioned an artwork, Coenties Ship, for Lower Manhattan at the historic Coenties Slip. The 20-foot-high stainless steel and glass sculpture was awarded the New York City Design Excellence Award (2006). Hunt created and installed ten Waterfall sculptures on Park Avenue in New York City between 52nd and 57th Streets, in 2011, part of a changing public art outdoor exhibition. In 2014 Hunt was commissioned to create a sculpture, Axis Mundi, for the new One World Trade Center, New York.

Hunt's work is included in many distinguished private collections around the world.

He lives and works in Wainscott, New York, and also maintains a studio in New York City.

== Early work ==
One of Hunt's first "translations of modern spatial concepts into sculptural form was Empire State Building with Hindenburg (1974), in which a facsimile of the ill-fated zeppelin is tethered to an eight-foot-high replica of the Empire State Building."

== Recent work ==
Hunt's recent work includes Axis Mundi, 2014, installed in the 64th floor Sky Lobby, in the new One World Trade Center building in New York City.

ARTnews reports that "Bryan Hunt has since 1974 returned repeatedly to the 'airship' motif." The article continues, "This enterprising exhibition presented an opportunity to compare his variations on that motif and see where they fit in his highly prolific, wide-ranging career." The airships were constructed of silk paper over light spruce or balsa wood frames, then lacquered in various colors or covered in metal leaf. "Hunt has used the airship to explore a broad spectrum of references and meanings."

"A trio of tall, narrow sculptures study the way water flows, and eddies, and thickens around an obstacle or a curve. The large-scale pieces are called "Flumes", and, like Hunt's "Airships" series, they toy with volume and weight, the way basic elements—water, air—take up space and can be contained (or not)," reported The New Yorker in a review of his solo exhibition at Danese Gallery in 2006.

== Selected exhibitions ==
- Baldwin Gallery, Aspen, CO, Bryan Hunt-Sculpture and Photographs, 2013 (+2007, 2000, 1996)
- Danese Gallery, New York, Bryan Hunt: Recalculating, 2012 (+2010)
- Imago Gallery, Palm Desert, CA, Bryan Hunt, 2011
- The Drawing Room, East Hampton, NY, Bryan Hunt: Clay, 2011 (+2009)
- Crown Point Press, San Francisco, Bryan Hunt: A Survey, 1999
- Locks Gallery, Philadelphia, PA, Sculpture and Drawings, 1998
- Mary Boone Gallery, New York, Bryan Hunt: Sculptures, 1997
- Gagosian Gallery, New York, Crossing, Plunge, and Hoodoo, 1995
- Blum Helman Gallery, New York, Sculpture: Bryan Hunt, 1992

== Selected public collections ==
- The Anderson Collection at Stanford University, Palo Alto, California
- American Embassy, Moscow, Russia
- Art Institute of Chicago, Chicago, Illinois
- The Getty Museum, Los Angeles
- Herbert F. Johnson Museum of Art, Cornell University, Ithaca, New York
- The High Museum, Atlanta, Georgia
- Hirschhorn Museum, Washington, D.C.
- Kiasma Museum of Contemporary Art, Helsinki, Finland
- Lannan Foundation, New York
- Lehmbruck Museum, Duisburg, Germany
- Los Angeles County Museum of Art
- Louisiana Museum of Modern Art, Humiebaek, Denmark
- Mary and Leigh Block Museum of Art at Northwestern University
- Massachusetts Institute of Technology, Cambridge, Massachusetts
- The Metropolitan Museum of Art, New York
- Mori Building, Tokyo, Japan
- Museum of Contemporary Art, Los Angeles
- Museum of Fine Arts, Houston, Texas
- Museum of Modern Art, New York
- Museum of Twentieth Century Art, Vienna, Austria
- The Smithsonian American Art Museum, Washington D.C.
- Olympic Park, Seoul, Korea
- San Francisco Museum of Modern Art
- The Solomon R. Guggenheim Museum, New York
- The Peggy Guggenehim Collection, Venice, Italy
- Stedelijk Museum, Amsterdam, the Netherlands
- Whitney Museum of American Art, New York
- Yale University Art Gallery, New Haven, Connecticut

== Books ==
- Hunt, Bryan, Conversations with Nature, Museum of Modern Art, New York, 1982
- Hunt, Bryan and Constance Lewallen, Monuments and Wonders 1974-79, Locks Art Publications, Philadelphia, PA, 2007

== Awards ==
- Grand Prize, International Arts Festival, Seoul, Korea, 1991.
- Art Award, American Academy of Arts and Letters, 2007.

== Publications ==
- Elderfield, John, Against the grain, contemporary art from the Edward R. Broida collection, New York, Museum of Modern Art, 2006.
- Glenn, Constance W. and Jane K. Bledsoe, Bryan Hunt, a decade of drawings, Long Beach, CA, University Art Museum, California State University, 1983.
- Hunt, Bryan, Bryan Hunt, Falls and Figures, Ithaca, N.Y., Herbert F. Johnson Museum of Art, Cornell University, 1988.
- Hunt, Bryan, Bryan Hunt, Sculptures and Paintings, Philadelphia, PA, Locks Gallery, 1998.
- Scott, Sue A., Bryan Hunt, early work: sculpture and drawing, 1974-1980, Orlando, Fla., Orlando Museum of Art, 1991.
- Tuchman, Phyllis, Bryan Hunt, Twenty Years, Philadelphia, PA, Locks Gallery, 1995.
- Tuchman, Phyllis and Vincent Carnevale, Six in Bronze: Anthony Caro, Sandro Chia, Nancy Graves, Bryan Hunt, George Segal, Isaac Witkin, Williamstown, Mass., Williams College Museum of Art, 1983.

== See also ==
- Arch Falls (1981), Houston, Texas
