= Art and World War II =

Influence of World War II on art

During World War II, the relations between art and war can be articulated around two main issues. First, art (and, more generally, culture) found itself at the centre of an ideological war. Second, during World War II, many artists found themselves in the most difficult conditions (in an occupied country, in internment camps, in death camps) and their works are a testimony to a powerful "urge to create." Such creative impulse can be interpreted as the expression of self-preservation, a survival instinct in critical times.

== Historical context ==
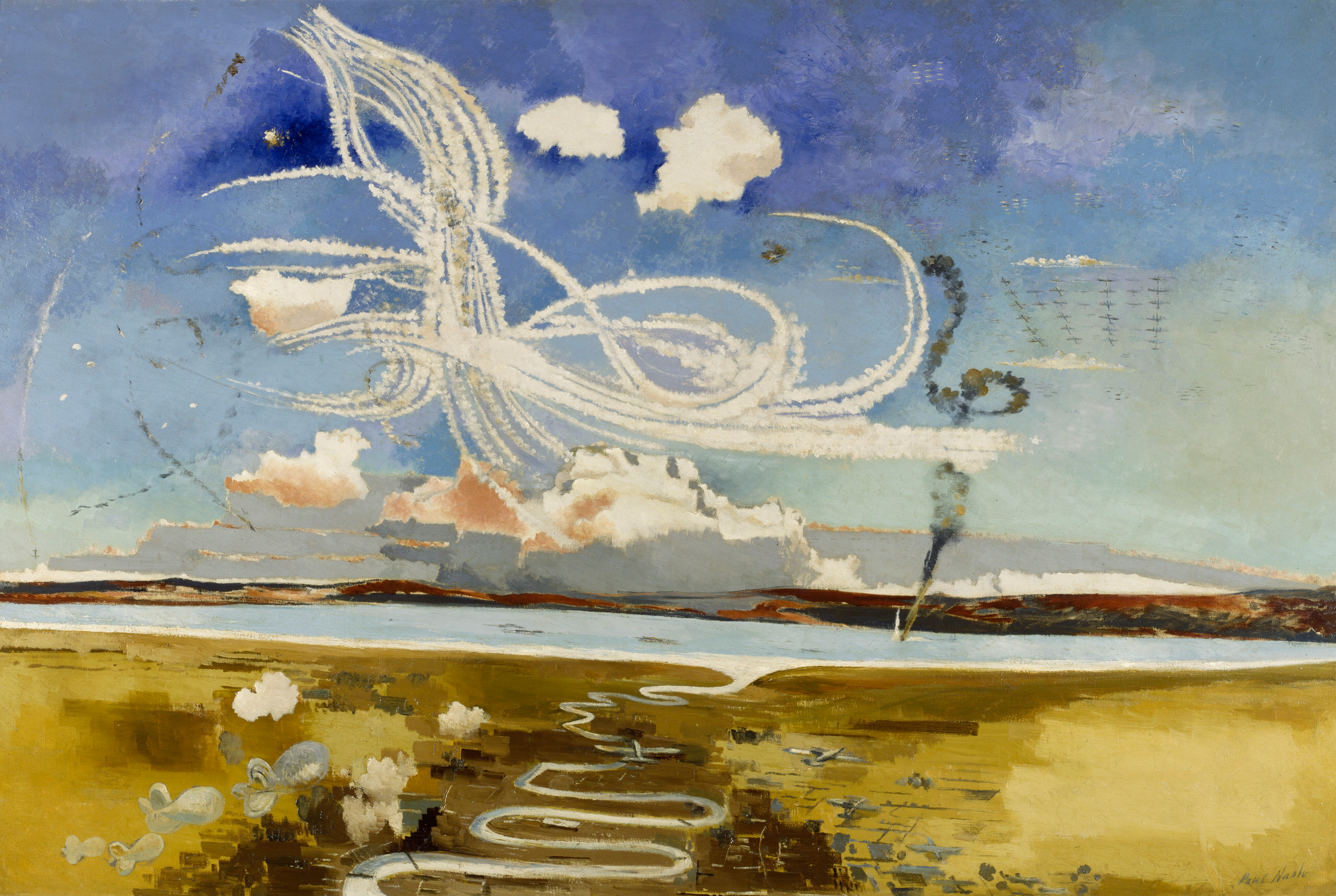
Battle of Britain by Paul Nash, 1941

Throughout history, most representations of war depict military achievements and often show significant battle scenes. However, in the 19th century a “turn” in the visual representation of war became noticeable. Artists started to show the disastrous aspects of war, instead of its glorified events and protagonists. Such a perspective is best exemplified by Francisco Goya's series, The Disasters of War (1810-1820, first published in 1863), and Otto Dix's portfolio, Der Krieg (published in 1924).

Battle of Germany by Paul Nash, 1944

During World War II, both traditions are present. For instance, Paul Nash's Battle of Britain (1941) represents a scene of aerial combat between British and German fighters over the English channel. On the other hand, André Fougeron's Street of Paris (1943) focuses on the impact of war and occupation by armed forces on civilians.

== Art in Nazi Germany ==
=== WWII art ===
In totalitarian regimes (especially in Hitler’s Germany), the control of art and other cultural expressions was an integral part of the establishment of power. It reflects totalitarianism's aim to control every single aspect of society and the individuals’ lives. However, art and culture had a special importance because they have the power to influence people, and they embody the identity of a nation, a community, a group of people.

In Nazi Germany, Hitler's cultural politic was twofold. The first step was a “cultural cleansing”. German culture and society were said to be in decline because forces of decadence had taken over and corrupted it (it is the idea of the “enemy within”). The cultural cleansing was to be accompanied by a “rebirth” of German culture and society (Hitler had grand plans for several museums), which involved an exaltation of the “true spirit” of the German people in art. This officially sanctioned art was conservative and figurative, heavily inspired by Greco-Roman art. It was often grandiose and sentimental. In terms of contents, this art should represent and convey the regime's ideals.

In 1937 in Munich, two simultaneous events demonstrated the Nazis’ views about art. One exhibition displayed art that should be eliminated (“The Degenerate Art Exhibition”), while the other promoted, by contrast, the official aesthetic (“The Great German Art Exhibition”).

In Europe, other totalitarian regimes adopted a similar stance on art and encouraged or imposed an official aesthetic, which was a form of Realism. Here Realism refers to a representational, mimetic style, and not to an art deprived of idealization. Such style was anchored in a prestigious tradition – popular, easy to understand, and thus practical for propaganda aims.

It was clear in Stalin’s Soviet Union, where diversity in the arts was proscribed and “Socialist Realism” was instituted as the official style. Modern art was banned as being decadent, bourgeois and elitist. The comparison of sculptures placed by national pavilions during the 1937 International Exhibition in Paris is revealing. The exhibition was dominated by the confrontation between Germany and the Soviet Union, with their imposing pavilions facing each other. On one side, Josef Thorak's sculptures were displayed by the German pavilion's entrance. And on the other, Vera Mukhina’s sculpture, Worker and Kolkhoz Woman, was placed on top of the Soviet pavilion.

=== Degenerate art ===
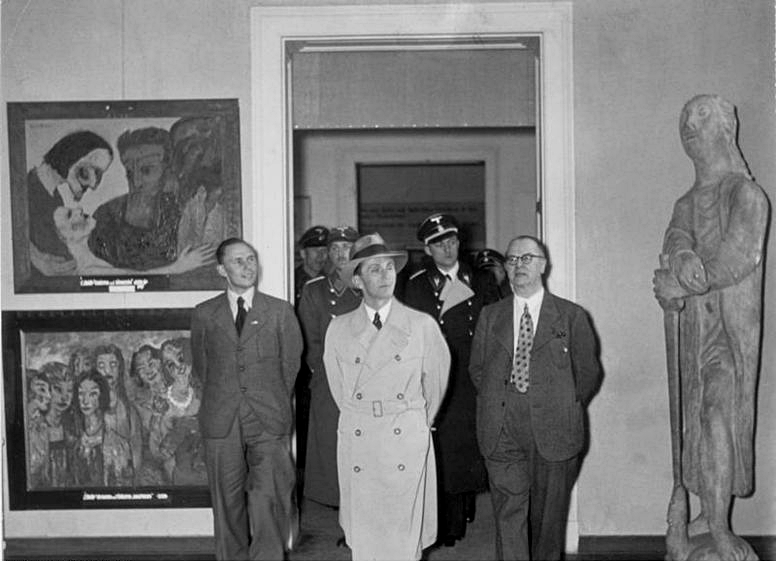
Joseph Goebbels at the Degenerate Art Exhibition

The term “degenerate” was used in connection with the idea that modern artists and their art were compromising the purity of the German race. They were presented as elements of “racial impurity,” “parasites,” causing a deterioration of German society. These decadent and “degenerate” forces had to be eradicated. Cultural actors who were labelled “un-German” by the regime were persecuted: they were fired from their teaching positions, artworks were removed from museums, books were burnt. All artists who did not fall in line with the party's ideology (above all Jewish and Communist artists) were “un-German.”

The Degenerate Art Exhibition (Munich, 19 July-30 Nov. 1937) was made out of works confiscated in German museums. The works were placed in unflattering ways, with derogatory comments and slogans painted around them (“Nature as seen by sick minds”, “Deliberate sabotage of national defense”...). The aim was to convince visitors that modern art was an attack on the German people. Mostly, these works of art were Expressionist, abstract or made by Jewish and Leftist artists. The exhibition was displayed in several German and Austrian cities. Subsequently, most of the artworks were either destroyed or sold.

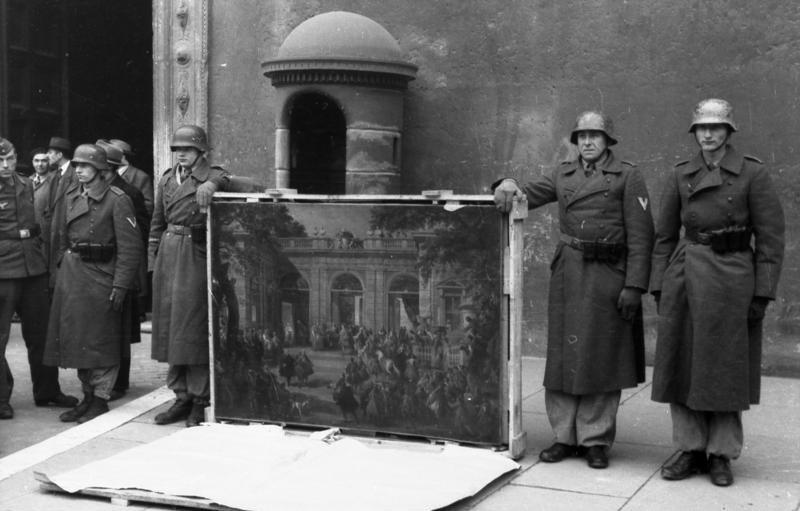
German soldiers of the Hermann Göring Division posing near the main entrance of Palazzo Venezia showing a painting taken from the National Museum of Naples Picture Gallery

Modern art could not fall in line with the Nazi values and taste for several reasons:

- its constant innovation and change
- its independency and freedom
- its cosmopolitanism and reticence to profess any type of nationalist allegiance
- its ambiguity and its lack of easily understandable and definitive meaning
- its rejection and deconstruction of the mimetic tradition of representation

France was occupied by Nazi Germany from 22 June 1940 until early May 1945. An occupying power endeavours to normalise life as far as is possible since this optimises the maintenance of order and minimises the costs of occupation. The Germans decreed that life, including artistic life should resume as before (the war). There were exceptions. Jews were targeted, and their art collections confiscated. Some of this consisted of modern, degenerate art which was partly destroyed, although some was sold on the international art market. Masterpieces of European art were taken from these collectors and French museums and were sent to Germany. Known political opponents were also excluded and overtly political art was forbidden.

== Persecuted artists ==
During the rise of Nazism, some artists had expressed their opposition. After the Nazis seized power, modern artists and those of Jewish ancestry were classed as degenerate. Any Jewish artists, or artists who were known opponents to the regime, were liable to imprisonment unless they conformed with the authorities’ view of what was "acceptable" in art. These artists were all in danger. Among those who chose to stay in Germany, some retreated into an “inner exile”, or “inner emigration" (“Innere Emigration”).

Artists had the choice of collaborating or resisting. But most people in such a predicament will normally find a middle way. Resistance was dangerous and unlikely to escape fierce punishment and while collaboration offered an easier path principled objection to it was a strong deterrent to many if not most. The other options were withdrawal, finding refuge abroad or, for many, to take the pragmatic course by simply continuing to work within the new restrictions. Hence artistic life and expression appeared light, carefree and frivolous, but was also lively.

=== Exiled artists ===
The German artist John Heartfield (who had been part of Dada Berlin) is an example of an artist who expressed opposition. While Hitler's popularity was growing in Germany, he consistently produced photomontages that denounced the future dictator and his party. Most of them were published in Arbeiter-Illustrierte-Zeitung [AIZ, Workers' Illustrated Newspaper], and a lot of them appeared on the cover. His artworks were like visual weapons against Nazism, a counter-power. In them, he subverted Hitler's figure and Nazi symbols. Through powerful visual juxtapositions, he revealed Nazism manipulations and contradictions, and showed the truth about them. As soon as Hitler came to power in 1933, Heartfield had to flee, finding refuge first in Prague and then in the UK.

Otto Dix had been labelled as a “degenerate” artist. His works were removed from museums, he was fired from his teaching position, and he was forbidden to create anything political as well as to exhibit. He moved to the countryside and painted landscapes for the duration of the war.

Many artists chose to leave Germany. But their exile did not secure their position in the art world abroad. Their personal and artistic security depended on the laws and attitude of the country of exile. Some sought collaboration with others in exile, forming groups to exhibit, such as the Free German League of Culture founded in 1938 in London. One of their goals was to show that German culture and art were not to be equated with the cultural expressions sanctioned and produced by the Nazi regime.

Other artists went their own way, independently, often choosing apolitical subjects and sometimes refusing to participate in political events. They considered art as a completely autonomous activity that should not be submitted to a political cause. On the contrary, someone like Oskar Kokoschka, who had until then rejected the idea that art should be useful and serve a cause, got involved in these groups when he emigrated to London in 1938. He created a series of political allegories, i.e. paintings in which he made comments on war politics.

=== Artists in internment camps ===
Once the war had commenced, everyone of Austro-German extraction was considered to be a security risk in Britain and became an enemy alien. They were interned in 1940, in camps on the Isle of Man. In Britain, however, there was considerable concern that many who had opposed the Nazi regime and escaped with their lives were now in detention in poor conditions. This led to a form of re-classification that led to many early releases in 1940, and by 1942 most of the internees had been released.

Inside the camps, some of the inmates were artists, musicians, and other intelligentsia, and they rebuilt as much cultural life as they could within the constraints of their imprisonment: the giving of lectures and concerts and the creation of artworks from materials like charcoal from burnt twigs, dyes from plants and the use of lino and newspaper. They also received materials from the artistic community in Britain.

Heinz Kiwitz went into exile in 1937 after his release from imprisonment in Kemna and Börgermoor concentration camps. Max Ernst exiled to the United States in 1941.

In France, Austro-German citizens also became “enemy aliens” at the outbreak of war and were sent in internment camps. The Camp des Milles, near Aix-en-Provence, where German artists such as Max Ernst and Hans Bellmer were imprisoned, was famous for its artistic life. As France was invaded, the situation of exiled German artists got more complicated and dangerous. They risked deportation, forced labour and extermination in the case of Jewish artists, both in occupied France and in the Vichy Republic. Most chose to emigrate further while others went into hiding.

In the US, citizens of Japanese extraction also faced internment in very poor living conditions and with little sympathy for their plight throughout the period of hostilities and beyond.

== World War II art ==
=== Protest art ===
Those who wished to overtly oppose the Nazis in their art either worked abroad (for example, André Masson) or clandestinely, as part of the resistance movement (such as André Fougeron). In the public space, resistance took on more symbolic forms. A group known as 'Jeunes peintres de tradition française' exhibited in Paris for the first time in 1941. The works they produced during the period were characterised by semi-abstract art and bright colours, which they considered as a form of resistance to the Nazis. Other supposedly non-political works were ambiguous – they observed the hardships of life in France without apportioning blame. Picasso, who had stayed in Paris, painted but refused to exhibit. He did not paint the war or anything openly political, but he said that the war was in his pictures.

Modern art became the bearer of liberal values, as opposed to the reactionary artistic preferences of the totalitarian regimes. Artistic choices embodied different positions in the ongoing ideological battle. Placing Alberto Sánchez Pérez's abstract sculpture, The Spanish people have a path that leads to a star (1937), at the entrance of the pavilion of the Spanish Republic was a political statement. So was commissioning modern artists to create works of art for this pavilion. Pablo Picasso showed two works: a pair of etchings entitled The Dream and Lie of Franco, 1937, and his monumental painting, Guernica, 1937. Joan Miró painted a huge mural entitled Catalan Peasant in Revolt (aka The Reaper, destroyed), and he did a poster entitled “Aidez l’Espagne” (Help Spain), meant to support the Republicans’ cause. The American artist Alexander Calder created the abstract sculpture Mercury Fountain (1937). The involvement of a non-Spanish artist was also an important statement in an era dominated by the rise of nationalism, both in democratic and totalitarian regimes.

Even in democracies, voices called for a return to a more representational style. For instance, some criticized the central place given to Picasso's Guernica because it was not explicit enough in its denunciation and was too complex. They would have preferred that the focus be placed on paintings such as Horacio Ferrer’s Madrid 1937 (Black Planes), from 1937. Its “message” was much clearer and – as a consequence – it functioned better as a political statement.

When they wanted to support the democratic cause and protest against Fascism and dictators, artists were often encouraged to put aside their modernist style and express themselves in a more realist (i.e. representational) style. For instance, Josep Renau, the Republican Government's director general of Fine Arts, said in 1937: “The poster maker, as an artist, knows a disciplined freedom, a freedom conditioned by objective demands, external to his individual will. Thus for the poster artist the simple question of expressing his own sensibility and emotion is neither legitimate nor practically realizable, if not in the service of an objective goal.” And the French author, Louis Aragon, declared in 1936: “For artists as for every person who feels like a spokesperson for a new humanity, the Spanish flames and blood put Realism on the agenda.” In other words, the artist's political engagement required a submission of the work's artistic aspects to the expression of the political content.

The series The Year of Peril, created in 1942 by the American artist Thomas Hart Benton, illustrates how the boundary between art and propaganda can be blurred by such a stance. Produced as a reaction to the bombing of Pearl Harbor by the Japanese army in 1941, the series portrayed the threat posed to the U.S. by Nazism and Fascism in an expressive but representational style. The message is clearly and powerfully delivered. These images were massively reproduced and disseminated in order to contribute to raise support for the U.S. involvement in World War II.

Thus, there can be troubling affinities between Allied politically-engaged art and fascist and totalitarian art when in both cases art and artists are used to create “persuasive images”, i.e. visual propaganda. Such a conception of political art was problematic for many modern artists as modernism was precisely defined by its autonomy from anything non-artistic. For some, absolute artistic freedom – and thus freedom from the requirement of having a clear, stable, and easily decipherable meaning – should have been what symbolised the liberal and progressive values and spirit of democracies.

=== Political art ===
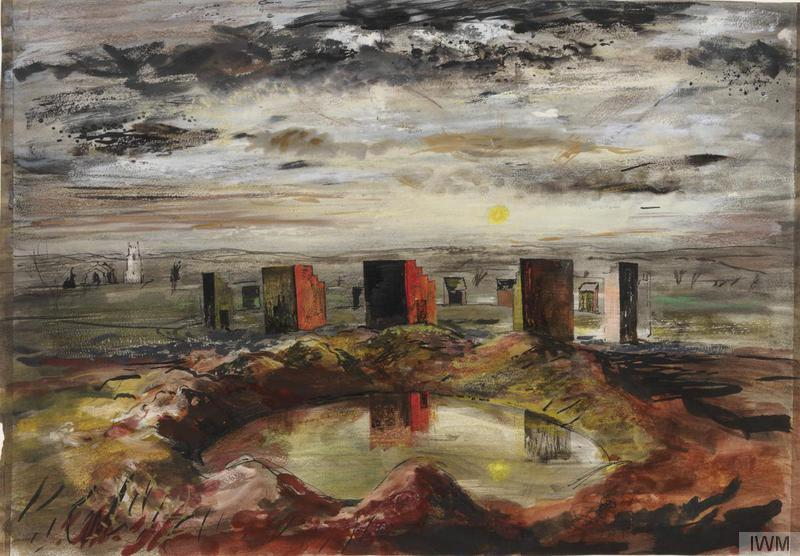
Shelter Experiments, near Woburn, Bedfordshire by John Piper, 1943

Britain was also subject to political differences during the 1930s but did not suffer repression nor civil war as elsewhere, and could enter World War II with a justifiable sense of defending freedom and democracy. Art had similarly followed the free expression at the heart of modernism, but political appropriation was already sought [as in the left-wing Artists' International Association founded in 1933]. With the outbreak of war came official recognition of art's use as propaganda. However, in Britain, political promotion did not include the persecution of artistic freedom in general.

In 1939, the War Artists Advisory Committee (WAAC) was founded under the aegis of the British Ministry of Information, with the remit to list and select artists qualified to record the war and pursue other war purposes. Artists were thought to have special skills useful to a country at war: they could interpret and express the essence of wartime experiences and create images that promoted the country's culture and values. Not the least of these was artists’ freedom to choose the subjects and style of their art. A significant influence was the choice of Sir Kenneth Clark as instigator and director of WAAC, as he believed that the first duty of an artist was to produce good works of art that would bring international renown. And he believed the second duty was to produce images through which a country presents itself to the world, and a record of war more expressive than a camera may give. Important to this was the exhibition of Britain at War at Museum of Modern Art in New York in 1941 (22 May to 2 September).

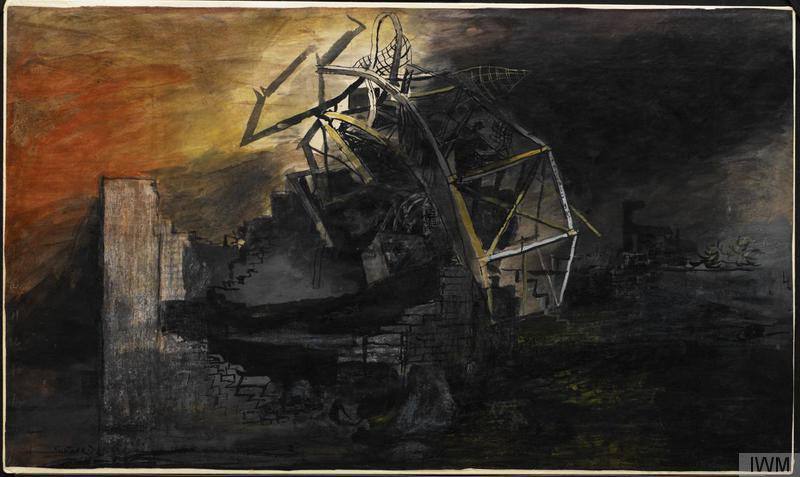
The City A fallen lift shaft by Graham Sutherland, 1941

This initiative also provided support for British artists when the world seemed to be sinking into barbarism. But it was not without intentions and constraints, and some works were rejected or censored. Accurate representations were required and abstract art, as it did not deliver a clear message, was avoided. Some depictions could be too realistic and were censored because they revealed sensitive information or would have scared people – and maintaining the nation's morale was vital. No foreign artists were admitted to the programme, a great sorrow to many who had fled to Britain from persecution elsewhere.

Despite these restrictions, the work commissioned was illustrative, non-bombastic, and often of great distinction thanks to established artists such as Paul Nash, John Piper, Henry Moore, Graham Sutherland and Stanley Spencer.

=== Holocaust art ===
Many works of art and images were created by detainees in ghettos and in concentration and extermination camps. They form a large body of images. Most of them were small and fragile, many were destroyed and lost. The large majority of these images were created clandestinely because such a creative activity was often forbidden and could have resulted in a death sentence. Yet, many inmates found materials and transgressed the rules in order to create.

Their motives for doing so were multiple but they all seem to have been linked to a survival instinct and self-preservation. Art could be a distraction and an escape from the horrors of the present. Distancing oneself (by depicting imaginary scenes or by taking on the role of the observer) was a way to keep some sanity. Doing drawings could also be a way to barter and thus to increase one's chances of survival in the camp or ghetto. Moreover, by creating visual artefacts there was the hope of creating something that would survive to one's death and would live on to testify to one's existence. Some seemed to have been animated by a documentary spirit: recording what was happening to them for people beyond the fence. Finally, such a creative urge was a form of cultural resistance. When their persecutors were trying to eradicate every bit of their humanity, artistic creation and testimony were ways to reclaim it, to preserve and cultivate it.

In terms of subject matters, the images created in concentration and extermination camps are characterised by their determination to enhance the detainees’ dignity and individuality. This is probably the most visible in the numerous portraits that were done. Whereas the Nazi extermination machine aimed at dehumanising the internees, creating “faceless” beings, clandestine artists would give them back their individuality. In this body of works, depictions of atrocities are not so frequent, which suggests that they might have been intentionally avoided. Rather, it is after the liberation, in the art of survivors that the most brutal and abominable aspects of concentration and extermination camps found a visual expression.

In the face of such horrors, some artists were confronted with ethical problems and felt that representation had reached a limit. Thus, since the liberation of the camps, artists who have wanted to express the Holocaust in their art have often chosen abstraction or symbolism, thus avoided any explicit representations. A few went as far as to suggest that art itself – and not simply representational art – had reached a limit because creating an aesthetic object about the Holocaust would be, in itself, unethical, morally reprehensible.
