= George Rickey =

American kinetic sculptor (1907–2002)

- Breaking Column, stainless steel, 1988, Honolulu Museum of Art
- Born: June 6, 1907; South Bend, Indiana, U.S.
- Died: July 17, 2002 (aged 95); Saint Paul, Minnesota, U.S.
- Education: University of Oxford
- Known for: Sculpture
- Movement: Kinetic Sculpture

George Warren Rickey (June 6, 1907 – July 17, 2002) was an American kinetic sculptor known for geometric abstractions, often large-scale, engineered to move in response to air currents.

== Early life and education ==
Rickey was born on June 6, 1907, in South Bend, Indiana. When Rickey was still a child, his father, an engineer with Singer Sewing Machine Company, moved the family to Glasgow, Scotland, in 1913. Growing up with a father who was an engineer and a grandfather who was a clockmaker instilled in the young Rickey an interest in mechanical systems and anything needing winding or cranking, from the family car to the phonograph. Additionally, the Rickeys lived near the river Clyde, and George learned to sail around the outer islands on the family's 30 feet (9.1 m) sailboat. As did his youthful interest in engineering, Rickey’s familiarity with boat movements from an early age would inform the signature kinectic sculpture he began developing in the 1950s.

Rickey was educated at Glenalmond College and received a degree in history from Balliol College, Oxford, with frequent visits to the Ruskin School of Drawing. He spent a short time traveling Europe and, against the advice of his father, studied art in Paris at Académie L'Hote and Académie Moderne. He then returned to the United States and began teaching at the Groton School, where among his many students was future National Security Advisor McGeorge Bundy.

After leaving Groton, Rickey taught at various schools throughout the country as part of the Carnegie Corporation Visiting Artists/Artists in Residence program (partially funded by the Works Progress Administration). His focus was primarily on painting and he began to reject European modernism in favor of American social realism. While taking part in these programs, he painted portraits, taught classes, and created a set of murals at Olivet College and Knox College, Galesburg, Illinois. He recruited student assistants to help with the murals. Meanwhile, he maintained an art studio in New York from 1934 to 1942, when he was drafted.

Rickey's interest in things mechanical re-awakened during his wartime work in aircraft and gunnery systems research and maintenance. Following his discharge, he studied art at the New York University Institute of Fine Arts and later at the Chicago Institute of Design, funded by the G.I. Bill. He taught art at variety of colleges, including Muhlenberg College. While at Muhlenberg, he was commissioned by J. I. Rodale to illustrate an edition of Anton Chekhov's The Beggar and Other Tales. Rickey later moved on to Indiana University South Bend. There, he encountered and was inspired by the work of David Smith.

== Kinetic sculpture ==
Rickey turned from painting to creating kinetic sculpture. Rickey combined his love of engineering and mechanics by designing sculptures whose metal parts moved in response to the slightest air currents.

His first sculpture was shown in New York in 1951 at the Metropolitan Museum of Art group show American Sculpture 1951. The Museum of Modern Art, in New York purchased his Two Lines Temporal I, after Alfred Barr, MOMA's then director, had seen it at the exhibition Documenta III in Kassel, Germany.

Rickey's sculptures can now be seen in major museums in the US and in most European capitals, Japan, and New Zealand. His work is often compared to the mobiles of Alexander Calder, but while Calder used organic, playful forms, Rickey's European lineage is more closely related to the Constructivist principles of geometric engineering. In 1967, he wrote Constructivism – origins and evolution, published by George Braziller, Inc., New York.

In 1974, Reader's Digest took particular note of his monumental sculpture at the Long Beach Museum of Art, Two Lines Up-Speed.

Two Open Triangles Up Gyratory, stainless steel, 1982, Honolulu Museum of Art

External videos
- Three Rectangles Horizontal Jointed Gyratory III
- Kinetic sculpture on YouTube at the Delaware Art Museum (1:03)

In works such as Two Open Triangles Up Gyratory, Rickey's two wind driven elements (engineered to withstand winds of 80 miles per hour (130 km/h)) provide an endless series of combined, almost dance like, shapes and movements.

Rickey mastered not only ordered predictable movements, but also mastered methods of controlling both the speed and tempo of similar objects to respond more randomly, such as in his work Four Open Rectangles Diagonal Jointed Gyratory V.

Much of his work was created in his studio in East Chatham, New York, where he moved after taking a position as a professor of art (sculpture) at Rensselaer Polytechnic Institute in Troy, New York. His kinetic sculpture titled Two Rectangles, Vertical Gyratory Up, Variation III was a central element of the Rensselaer campus from 1972. It is now located at latitude 47°22'12.0"N longitude 8°32'03.7"E in Zurich, Switzerland, near the headquarters of UBS. This sculpture was known as the Chrinitoid when it was located on the Rensselaer campus on long term loan. It was removed in the summer of 1984 after Rickey and Rensselaer could not agree on a purchase price. A similar sculpture, variation V, is currently located in the Gibbs Farm sculpture collection in New Zealand.

Rickey also lived and worked in Berlin for many years, following the Documenta III art show. His studio time was spent constructing sculpture and preparing for exhibitions in Europe. In Rickey's words the city was like a "cocoon" in the middle of communist East Germany, with a lively and advanced social and cultural life which he partook in fully. During this time he received numerous Honorary Doctor of Fine Arts degrees.

In 1979 he had a retrospective at the Guggenheim Museum in New York City. Rickey's sculptures are on permanent exhibition at the National Gallery of Art, and the Hirshhorn Museum in Washington, D.C., the Governor Nelson A. Rockefeller Empire State Plaza Art Collection in Albany, New York, the San Diego Museum of Art, The Delaware Art Museum, The Indiana University Art Museum, the Honolulu Museum of Art, Frederik Meijer Gardens & Sculpture Park, and at the Laumeier Sculpture Park in St. Louis, The Hyde Collection in Glens Falls, NY, and many other institutions.

In 1985, George Rickey had a major retrospective in South Bend, Indiana, the place of his birth. His sculptures were installed outside (and inside) of the South Bend Art Center, and also at the Snite Museum of Art on the campus of the University of Notre Dame. Rickey gave a presentation of his work at the Snite. One of the stories he told concerned how, as a result of a World War II-era, government-administered aptitude test, he was assigned to design machine gun turrets for bombers. It was in this job that he became familiar with the high-quality ball bearings, balancing weights, riveted sheet metal, lightweight aircraft construction techniques, and modern hardware (and the vendors for same) that were to become the mechanical foundation for his later forays into lightweight, delicately balanced, wind-activated kinetic sculpture.

Rickey died at his home in Saint Paul, Minnesota, on July 17, 2002, at the age of 95. The Rickey Estate is currently represented by Kasmin Gallery in New York City. The Rickey archive will have a permanent home at Notre Dame. Ken Bortolazzo, Rickey's former West Coast associate, is the West Coast conservationist for the Rickey Estate.

== Gallery ==
Vier Vierecke im Geviert (Four squares in the Geviert), 1969, Stahl, Berlin

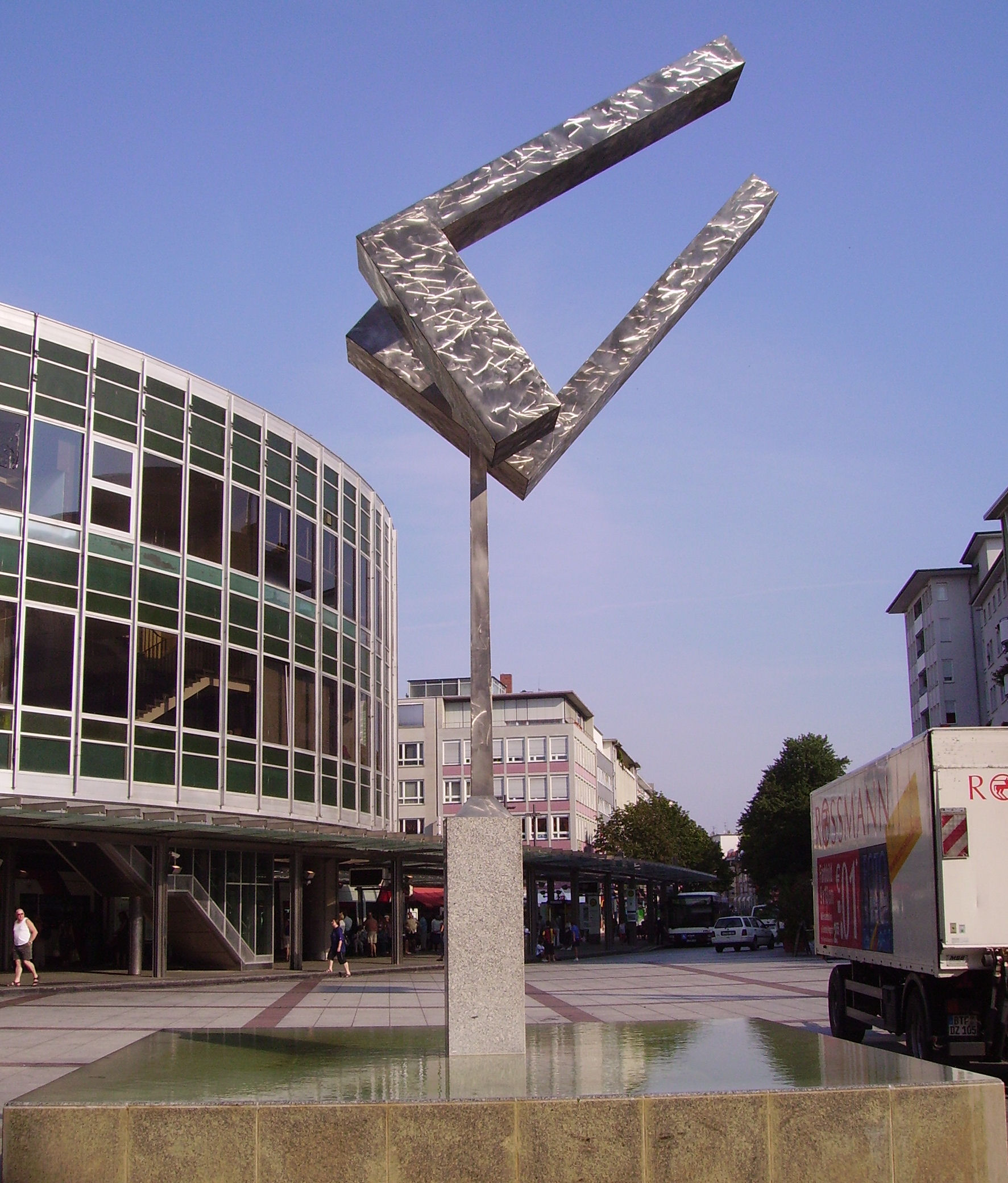
Conversation, 1999, Ludwigshafen, Germany

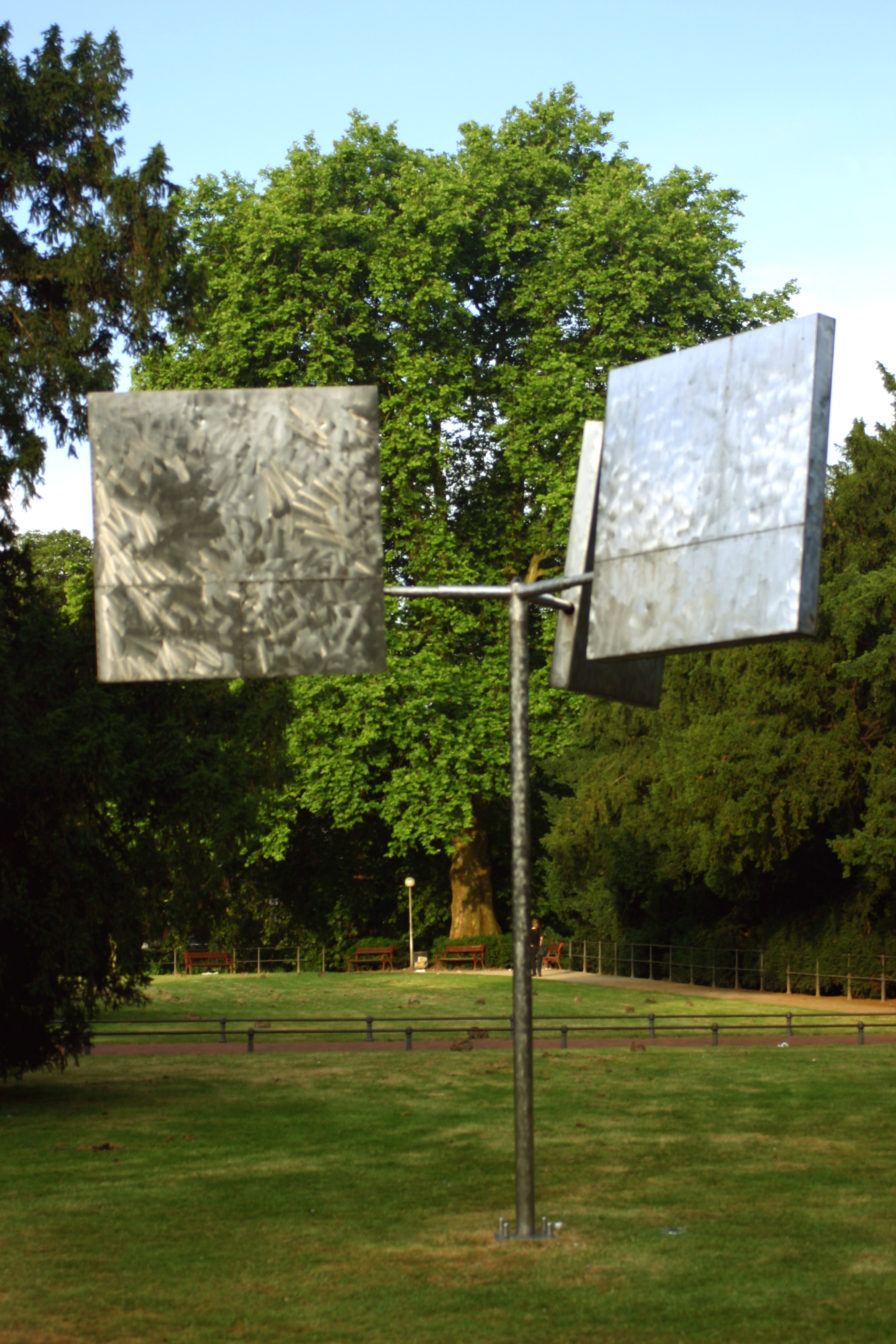
Drei rotierende Quadrate (Three rotary squares), Münster, Germany

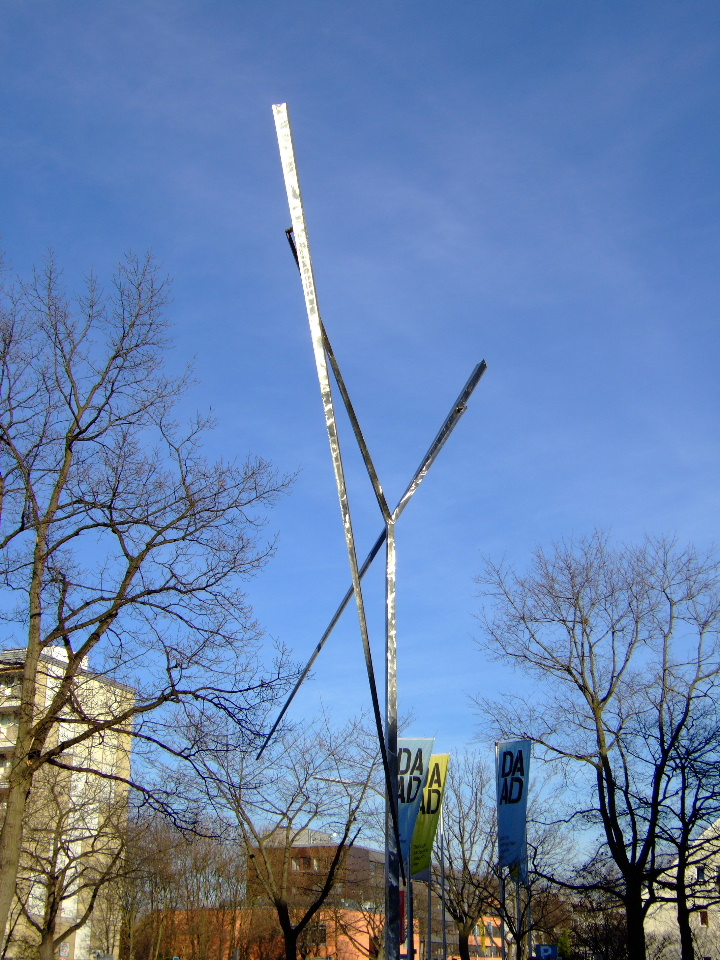
Kinetic sculpture, Germany

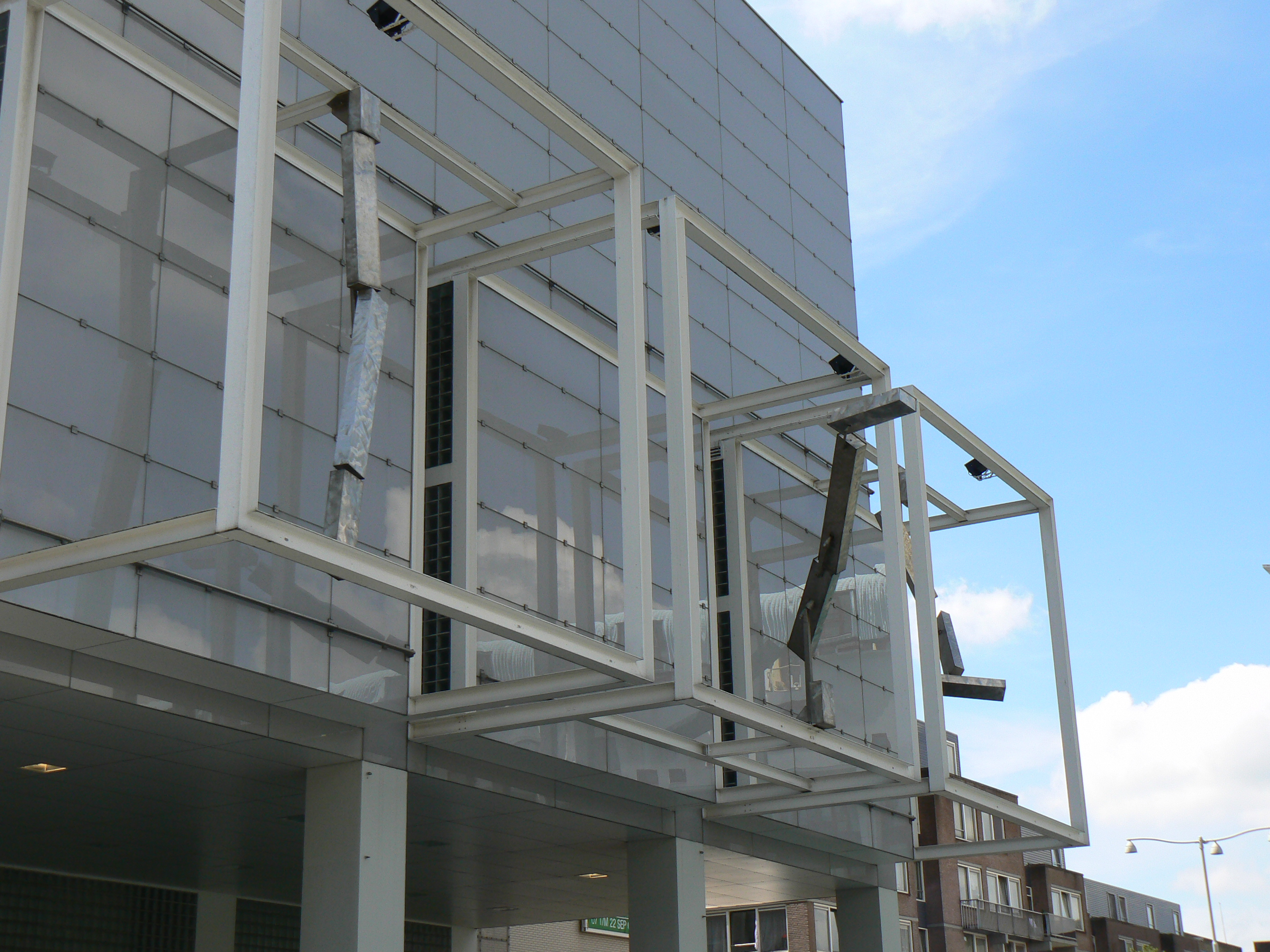
Kinetic sculpture, Rotterdam, Netherlands

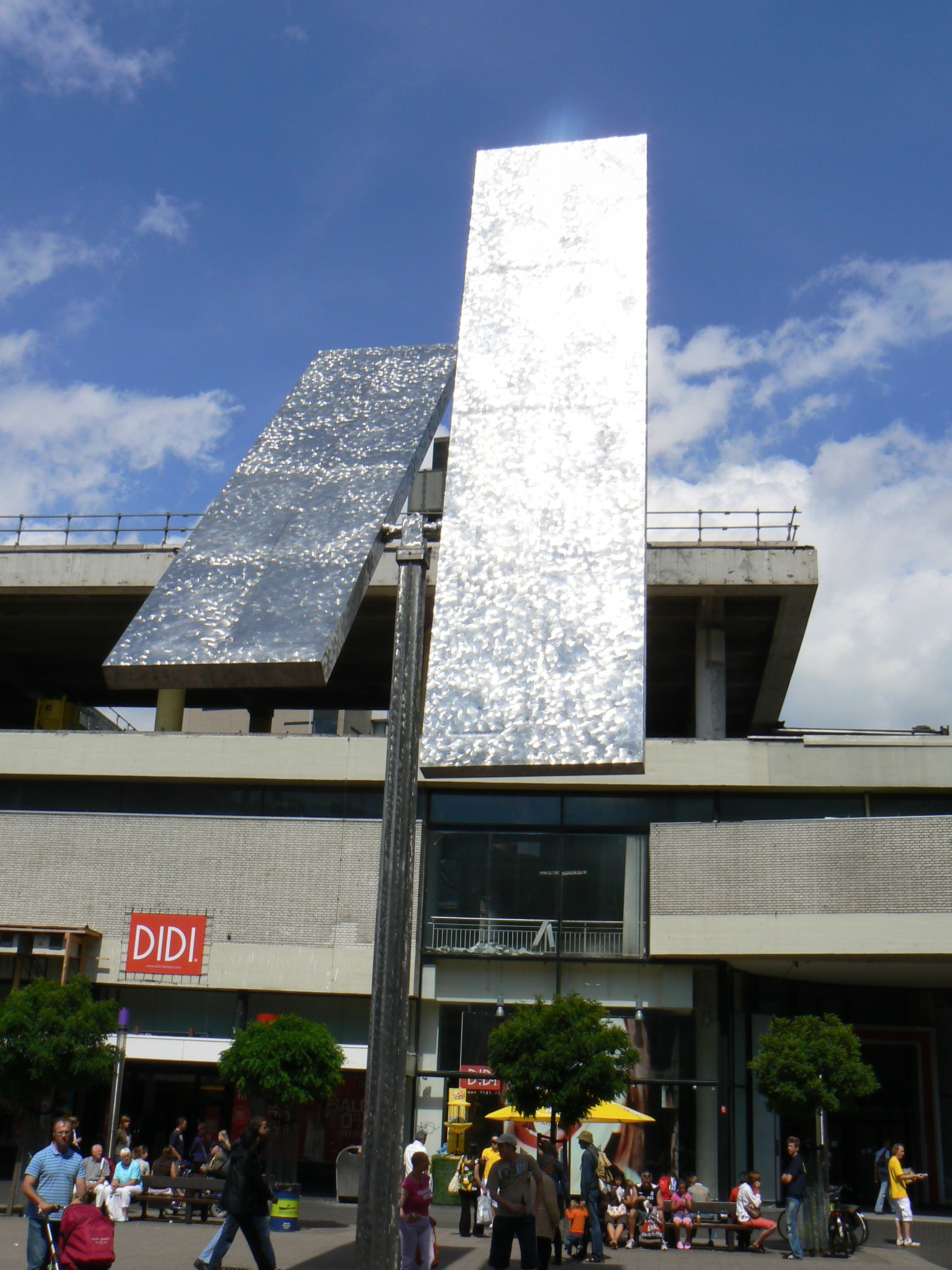
Kinetic sculpture (1971), Rotterdam, Netherlands

== Honors and awards ==
- (1999) Lifetime Achievement in Contemporary Sculpture Award, International Sculpture Center.

== See also ==
- Double L Excentric Gyratory
- Indianapolis Art Center which hosted the retrospective show A Life in Art: Works by George Rickey
- Two Lines Up Excentric Variation VI (1977), Columbus, Ohio
- Two Plane Vertical Horizontal Variation III, (1973), Seattle, Washington
- Two Lines Oblique: San Diego (1993), San Diego, California
