= Partisan Madonna of Minsk =

1978 painting by Mikhail Savitsky

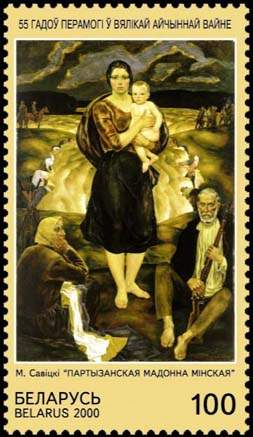
Partisan Madonna of Minsk on a Belarusian postage stamp, 2000

Partisan Madonna of Minsk (Belarusian: "Партызанская Мадонна Мінская") is a painting by Belarusian artist Mikhail Savitsky, completed in 1978 and preceded by similar painting, Partisan Madonna from 1967. The painting is based on the Sistine Madonna by Raphael Sanzio and reflects the motherhood and milieu of Soviet partisans during World War II. The painting is regarded by art critics as one of the best Belarusian paintings of the 20th century. Partisan Madonna of Minsk is housed in the Belarusian National Arts Museum in Minsk.

== See also ==
- And the Saved World Remembers
- Partisan Ballad
