= Pavel Kondratiev =

Russian painter

Pvel Kondratiev "Over trenches" from the cycle "Siters of Mercy", 1982.

Pavel Mikhailovich Kondratiev (Russian: Павел Михайлович Кондратьев; 1902-1985) was a Russian painter and graphic artist.

He studied art at Vkhutein in Petrograd. He was a student of Pavel Filonov and collaborated with Isaiah Braudo, Maria Yudina, and Tatyana Glebova. He was a close friend of Alice Poret, and he also featured in the verses of another friend, the poet Daniil Kharms.

Kondratiev was a gifted teacher. He collaborated with Vladimir Sterligov among others; his work is seen as a synthesis several areas of the Russian avant-garde. Among his most famous works are “North Caucasus”, “Remembering Chukotka”, “Pskov Land” “Sheaves”, “Sisters of Mercy”.

He died in Leningrad in 1985.
