= Mikhail Savitsky =

Belarusian painter

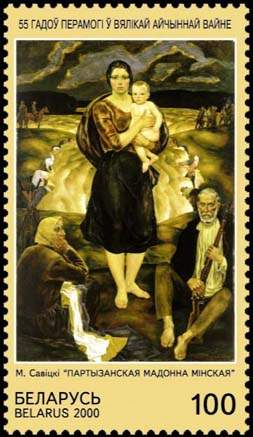
- Partisan Madonna of Minsk (1978) by Savitsky on a 2000 Belarusian postage stamp
- Born: February 18, 1922; Zvenyachi, Orshansky Uyezd, Vitebsk Governorate, Russian SFSR
- Died: November 8, 2010 (aged 88)
- Citizenship: Belarus
- Occupation: Painter

Signature
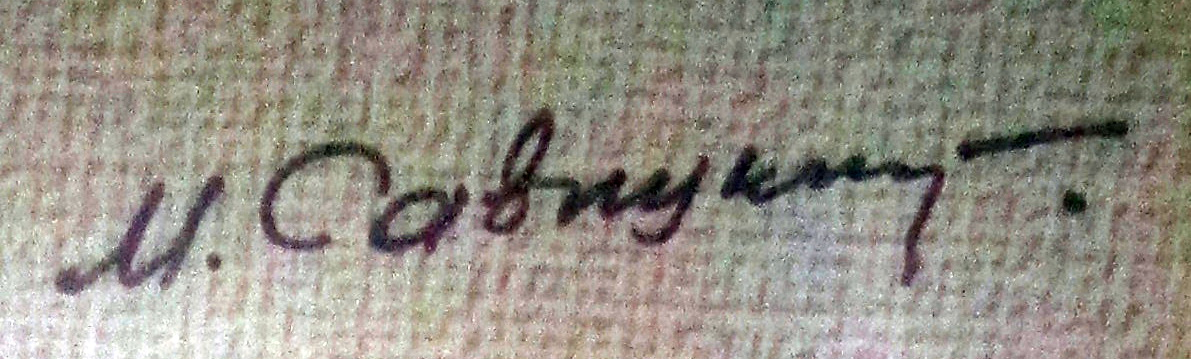

Mikhail Andreyevich Savitsky (Belarusian: Міхаі́л Андрэ́евіч Саві́цкі, Russian: Михаи́л Андре́евич Сави́цкий) (February 18, 1922 – November 8, 2010) was a Belarusian painter. Born in 1922, he served on the Eastern Front in World War II from 1941, but was captured and not released until the end of the war. Some of the paintings Savitsky did were the 1967 Partisan Madonna and the picture cycle "Figures on the Heart." For his artwork, he was awarded the title Hero of Belarus in 2006.

== Biography ==
Mikhail Savitsky was born on February 18, 1922, in the village Zvenyachi, Orshansky Uyezd, Vitebsk Governorate, Russian SFSR. When Savitsky was nineteen years old, the Great Patriotic War broke out in Belarus, which is also known to the rest of the world as World War II. The country was reunited and became a battlefield. Mikhail Savitsky joined the Anti-Aircraft Artillery and the 345th Infantry Division. At twenty years old, he fought in the battles of Sevastopol that lasted 250 days. Savitsky was captured by the Nazis and imprisoned in 3 out of the 260 death camps. He was placed in the camps Düsseldorf, Buchenwald, and Dachau. Savitsky was liberated from the Dachau captivity on April 29, 1945, when American troops arrived.

In the post-war era, Mikhail Savitsky received an education in arts. In 1951, he graduated from Minsk Art College and went on to study at the Moscow Art Institute of Surikov, graduating in 1957. Savitsky became the head of the national program “Creative academic studios for painting, drawing, and sculpturing” in Minsk. He was USSR's People's Deputy from 1989 to 1991, became a member of the International Slavic Academy, and received the Order of Francis Skaryna in 1997.

== Paintings ==
Many Savitsky's themes are focused around the war, for it constantly plagued his mind. One of his famous paintings, “Partisan Madonna” (1967), depicts a peasant mother, whom people saw as a Belarusian defense symbol during World War II.

Another popular artwork of his is ‘Leaving in the Night’ (1980), which was one of his later works. It depicts a mother and a daughter. The daughter is preparing to join a partisan unit to protect her home country, while her mother, filled with strength, allows her daughter to leave, knowing she could never see her again. The daughter's face is full of fear and sadness, which represented the emotions of the Belarusian people. Belarus was one of the first and most destructive battlegrounds in World War II. The daughter is scared but stays strong; she is determined to fight for her home regardless of her gender and young age. The painting's theme is to show the contrast between Dark and Light, as the struggle between Good and Evil is apparent.

== Honours and awards ==
Soviet Union

- Order of the Badge of Honour (1967)
- Order of the Red Banner of Labour (1972)
- USSR State Prize (1973)
- People's Artist of the USSR (1978)
- Order of Lenin (1982)

Belarus

- Hero of Belarus (2006)
- Order of Francysk Skaryna (1997)
