= Mai Dantsig =

Belarusian artist

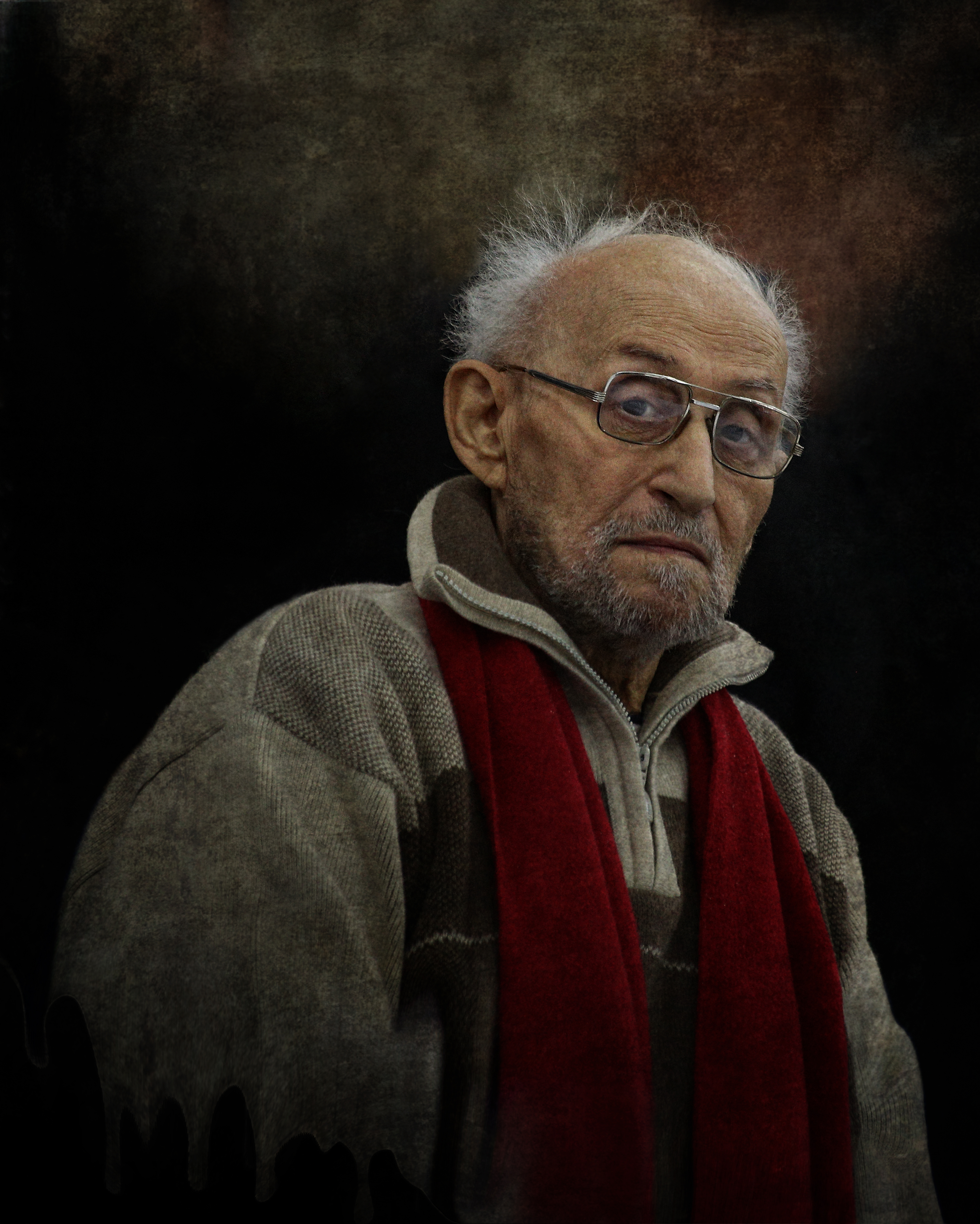
- Born: Mai Volfovich Dantsig; April 27, 1930; Minsk, Belarus
- Died: March 26, 2017 (aged 86); Minsk, Belarus
- Education: Minsk Art School; Surikov State Academic Institute of Fine Arts
- Occupation: Artist

Mai Volfovich Dantsig (Belarusian: Май Вольфавіч Данцыг; Russian: Май Вольфович Данциг; April 27, 1930 – March 26, 2017) was a Belarusian artist active during the Soviet era and independence of Belarus. He is considered to have been one of the founders of the contemporary Belarusian art.

== Education and career ==
Dantzig was born in Minsk, Belarus. He graduated from the Minsk Arts College in 1952 and the Moscow Surikov State Academic Institute of Fine Arts in 1958. In Moscow he studied under Mikhail Kurilko and Victor Tsyplakov.

From 1958, he taught at the Belarusian Academy of Arts. From 2001 until his death in 2017, he was the chairman of the Department of Painting there. In 1995, he became a People's Artist of Belarus. In 2005, he was awarded the Order of Francysk Skaryna.

== Paintings ==
Mai Dantsig often painted in large formats, which, in addition to his expressive style, helped transform his chosen themes from quotidian to important, and imbued his pictures with a monumental character. His works often take on symbolic or metaphorical significance.

He is the author of many paintings and drawings related to World War II and Soviet partisans including the And the Saved World Remembers. He is also famous for his series of portraits of Soviet intelligentsia including Bulat Okudzhava, Georgy Tovstonogov, Ales Adamovich and Vasil Bykaŭ.

== Death ==
Dantsig died on March 26, 2017, in Minsk from natural causes, at the age of 86.
