= List of public art in Washington, D.C., Ward 2 =

This is a list of public art in Ward 2 of Washington, D.C..

This list applies only to works of public art accessible in an outdoor public space. For example, this does not include artwork visible inside a museum.

Most of the works mentioned are sculptures. When this is not the case (sound installation, for example) it is stated next to the title.

| Title | Artist | Year | Location/GPS Coordinates | Material | Dimensions | Owner | Image |
|---|---|---|---|---|---|---|---|
| George Mason Memorial | Wendy M. Ross | 2002 | West Potomac Park 38°52′46″N 77°2′21″W | Bronze | | National Park Service | |
| Nuns of the Battlefield | Jerome Connor | c. 1924 | M St & Rhode Island Ave., N.W. 38°54′20.83″N 77°2′24.89″W | Bronze | Sculpture: approx. H. 6 ft. W. 9 ft. | National Park Service | |
| Renaissance | David Bakalar | 1989 | American Association for the Advancement of Science 38°54′0.1″N 77°1′41.8″W | Granite & Gold Leaf | l. 4 ft. | American Association for the Advancement of Science | |
| River Horse | | 1996 | Lisner Auditorium 38°53′58.12″N 77°2′48.43″W | Bronze | | George Washington University | |
| General Manuel Belgrano | Ignacio Ibarra | c. 2005 | Embassy of Argentina, Defense and Military Attaché's Office 38°54′53.0″N 77°2′47.2″W | Bronze | | Embassy of Argentina | |
| Grey Wolf | Mark Rossi | c. 2003 | Defenders of Wildlife 38°54′17.93″N 77°2′19.04″W | Bronze | | Defenders of Wildlife | |
| Lajos Kossuth | | | Hungarian Embassy 38°54′37.7″N 77°2′42.1″W | | | Embassy of Hungary | |
| Theodore Roosevelt | | | Hungarian Embassy 38°54′37.9″N 77°2′42.1″W | | | Embassy of Hungary | |
| Korean War Veterans Memorial | Frank Gaylord | 1995 | The National Mall 38°53′16.04″N 77°2′51.33″W | Granite & Stainless steel | | National Park Service | |
| National World War II Memorial | Friedrich St. Florian | 2004 | The National Mall 38°53′22.1″N 77°2′25.97″W | Granite | | National Park Service | |
| Ulysses S. Grant Memorial | Henry Merwin Shrady | 1924 | The National Mall 38°53′23.2″N 77°0′46.5″W | Bronze | | National Park Service | |
| Hotel Rouge Statues | | 2002 | Hotel Rouge 38°54′30.19″N 77°2′10.73″W | | | Kimpton Hotels & Restaurant Group | |
| Inspiration | Ethan Kerber | 2010 | 5th St. & K St., N.W. 38°54′10.7″N 77°1′7.6″W | Steel | 25 × 25 ft, 3,500 lbs. | DC Commission on the Arts & Humanities & The Mount Vernon Triangle Community Improvement District | |
| Lift Off | David Black | 2009 | City Vista 38°54′9.75″N 77°1′7.61″W | | | DC Commission on the Arts & Humanities & The Mount Vernon Triangle Community Improvement District | |
| Bridge Tender's House | Mikyoung Kim | 2009 | 14th Street Bridge 38°52′27.6″N 77°2′26.9″W | Dichroic Acrylic | | D.C. Commission on the Arts and Humanities | |
| Ad Astra | Richard Lippold | 1976 | National Air and Space Museum 38°53′19.03″N 77°1′11.43″W | Gold-colored polished stainless steel | 3,000 cm | Smithsonian Institution | |
| Continuum | Charles O. Perry | 1976 | National Air and Space Museum 38°53′15.93″N 77°1′11.6″W | Bronze | h. 168 cm. | Smithsonian Institution | |
| Major General John A. Logan | Franklin Simmons | 1901 | Logan Circle 38°54′34.78″N 77°1′46.75″W | Bronze & Granite | Sculpture: approx. 12 × 10 × 4 1/2 in.; Base: approx. 3 × 22 × 30 ft. (Sculpture 11,000 lbs. Bronze base 35,000 lbs.). | United States Department of the Interior | |
| Bernardo de Gálvez | Juan de Ávalos | 1976 | Virginia Ave. between 20th & 21st St., N.W. 38°53′44.5″N 77°2′54.7″W | Bronze & Granite | Sculpture: approx. 12 × 13 × 6 ft.; Base: approx. 15 × 13 × 6 ft. | United States Department of the Interior | |
| The Nations of the Pan American Health Association | Michael Lantz | 1970 | Pan American Health Organization 38°53′47.0″N 77°2′58.1″W | Bronze & Stone | Each medallion: approx. Diam. 2.5 ft. | Pan American Health Organization | |
| Philip Jaisohn | | 2008 | South Korean Embassy 38°54′43.6″N 77°3′4.4″W | Bronze | | South Korean Embassy | |
| Fidelity, Bravery, Integrity | Frederick Charles Shrady | 1979 | J. Edgar Hoover Building 38°53′42.2″N 77°1′30.5″W | Bronze & Granite | Sculpture: approx. W. 15 ft. 7 in. D. 5 ft. 7 in.; Base: approx. 2 ft. 6 in. × 10 ft. 3 in. × 7 ft. 4 in. | FBI | |
| American Legion Soldier | Adolph Wolter | 1951 | American Legion, 1608 K St., N.W. 38°54′8.4″N 77°2′14.4″W | Indiana Limestone | Sculpture: approx. H. 13 ft. | American Legion | |
| Buffaloes | Alexander Phimister Proctor | 1914 | Dumbarton Bridge 38°54′39.7″N 77°3′2.8″W | Bronze & Stone | 4 buffaloes. Each: approx. H. 7 ft. | D.C. Department of Public Works | |
| Luther Monument | Ernest Rietschel | Cast 1884 | Luther Place Memorial Church 38°54′23.6″N 77°1′54.1″W | Bronze & Granite | Sculpture: approx. H. 11.5 ft.; Base: approx. H. 168 in. W. 138 in. | Luther Place Memorial Church | |
| Equestrian of Simón Bolívar | Felix de Weldon | 1959 | 18th St. at C St & Virginia Ave. N.W. 38°53′35.2″N 77°2′31.2″W | Bronze & granite or marble | Sculpture: approx. 27 ft. × 96 in. × 208 in.; Base: approx. 142 × 72 × 184 in. (8 tons). | United States Department of the Interior | |
| Major General James B. McPherson | Louis Rebisso | 1876 | McPherson Square 38°54′7.0″N 77°2′2.8″W | Bronze & granite | Sculpture: approx. H. 14 ft. L. 12 ft.; Base: approx. H. 12 ft. D. 6 ft. | United States Department of the Interior | |
| Edmund Burke | James Havard Thomas | 1923 | Massachusetts Ave between 11th & 12th St, N.W. 38°54′14.0″N 77°1′38.8″W | Bronze & Granite | Sculpture: approx. 8 ft. × 39 1/2 in. × 39 1/2 in.; Base: approx. H. 72 in. × 92 in. | United States Department of the Interior | |
| Taras Shevchenko Memorial | Leo Mol | 1963 | Between 22nd St. & 23rd St. at P St., N.W. 38°54′36.2″N 77°2′56.3″W | Bronze & Granite | 2 parts. Sculpture: approx. 14 ft. × 4 ft. 7 in. × 4 ft. 6 in.; Base: approx. 7 ft. × 4 ft. 7 in. × 4 ft. 6 in. | United States Department of the Interior | |
| Liberador: General Jose de San Martin | Augustin-Alexandre Dumont | 1862 | Virginia Ave between 20th & 21st St, N.W. 38°53′42.1″N 77°2′42.9″W | Bronze & Concrete | | | |
| War or Peace | Jurgen Weber | 1965–1971 | John F. Kennedy Center for the Performing Arts 38°53′47.9″N 77°3′16.9″W | Bronze & Concrete | Sculpture: approx. 8 × 50 × 1.5 ft.; Base: approx. 4.5 × 20 × 3 ft. | United States Department of the Interior | |
| America | Jurgen Weber | 1965–1971 | John F. Kennedy Center for the Performing Arts 38°53′42.6″N 77°3′16.9″W | Bronze & Concrete | Sculpture: approx. 8 × 50 × 1.5 ft.; Base: approx. 4.5 × 20 × 3 ft. | United States Department of the Interior | |
| Don Quixote | Aurelio Teno | 1976 | John F. Kennedy Center for the Performing Arts 38°53′49.0″N 77°3′16.5″W | Bronze, Stone & Concrete | Sculpture: approx. 15 × 6 × 12 ft.; Base: approx. 4 × 5 × 12 ft. (66 tons). | United States Department of the Interior | |
| Don Quixote | Stafford Rolph | 1981 | 1776 G Street, N.W., Courtyard 38°53′52.9″N 77°2′28.3″W | Direct steel & Brick | Sculpture: approx. 106 × 119 × 70 in.; Base: approx. 36 × 97 × 96 in. | Robert T. Foley Company | |
| The Observer | Keith McCarter | 1983 | 1020 19th Street, N.W. 38°54′11.5″N 77°2′37.0″W | Bronze | Sculpture: approx. 6 × 10 × 7 ft. Diam. 10 ft.; Base: approx. 8 in. × 9 ft. × 6 ft. | Barnes, Morris, Pardoe, Foster | |
| William O. Douglas | Wendy Ross | 1976 | Chesapeake and Ohio Canal, 30th St. N.W. 38°54′15.1″N 77°3′33.9″W | Metal & Stone | Sculpture: approx. 2 ft. 3 in. × 1 ft. 6 in. × 1 ft. 3 in.; Base: approx. 3 ft. 10 in. × 1 ft. 6 in. × 1 ft. 2 1/2 in. | United States Department of the Interior | |
| Whooping Cranes | Kent Ullberg | 1988 | National Wildlife Federation 38°54′32.4″N 77°2′15.3″W | Stainless steel, Brick & Limestone | Sculpture: approx. 12 × 10 × 5 ft.; Base fountain: approx. H. 2.5 ft. Diam 20 ft. (2,300 lbs.). | National Wildlife Federation | |
| Salamander Finial | Raymond Kaskey | 1985 | Christian Heurich Mansion 38°54′28.8″N 77°2′41.0″W | Hammered copper | Approx. H. 7 ft. W. 3 ft. | Heurich House Foundation | |
| Sarah Louisa Rittenhouse Memorial | Unknown | 1956 | Montrose Park 38°54′47.1″N 77°3′40.0″W | Bronze & Granite | Sculpture: approx. 30 × 22 × 29 in.; Base: approx. 50 in × 2 ft. × 2 ft. | United States Department of the Interior | |
| Statue of Artemas Ward | Leonard Crunelle | 1938 | Ward Circle 38°56′16.5″N 77°5′9.3″W | Bronze | Sculpture: approx. 10 × 5 × 4 ft.; Base: approx. 10 × 5 × 4 ft. | United States Department of the Interior | |
| St. Stephen Martyr | Felix de Weldon | 1961 | Saint Stephen Martyr Catholic Church 38°54′11.9″N 77°3′10.4″W | Polychrome Porcelain & Concrete | Sculpture: approx. H. 10 ft.; Base: approx. W. 4 ft. 8 in. | Saint Stephen Martyr Catholic Church | |
| North America | Gutzon Borglum | 1910 | Organization of American States 38°53′34.7″N 77°2′24.1″W | Marble | Sculpture: approx. 10 ft. × 5 ft. 6 in. × 4 ft.; Base: approx. 11 ft. 10 in. × 213 1/2 in. × 226 in. | Organization of American States | |
| North American Eagle | Solon Borglum | 1910 | Organization of American States 38°53′34.7″N 77°2′24.1″W | Marble | Sculpture: approx. W. 3 ft. | Organization of American States | |
| South America | Isidore Konti | 1910 | Organization of American States 38°53′33.9″N 77°2′24.1″W | Marble | Sculpture: approx. 10 ft. × 76 in. × 4 ft.; Base: approx. 11 ft. 10 in. × 214 in. × 4 ft. | Organization of American States | |
| South American Condor | Isidore Konti | 1910 | Organization of American States 38°53′33.9″N 77°2′24.1″W | Marble | Sculpture: approx. H. 3 ft. | Organization of American States | |
| The Meeting of Bolivar and San Martin | Isidore Konti | 1910 | Organization of American States 38°53′33.9″N 77°2′24.1″W | Marble | Relief: approx. H. 4 ft. × W. 6 ft. | Organization of American States | |
| Washington's Farewell to His Generals | Gutzon Borglum | 1910 | Organization of American States 38°53′34.7″N 77°2′24.1″W | Marble | Relief: approx. H. 4 ft. × W. 6 ft. | Organization of American States | |
| Xochipilli, Aztec God of Flowers | Unknown | 1911 | Organization of American States 38°53′34.3″N 77°2′28.8″W | Painted concrete & White marble | Sculpture: approx. H. 5 ft. W. 5 ft. Diam. 6 ft.; Base: approx. H. 6 ft. W. 1 ft. | Organization of American States | |
| Cordell Hull | Bryant Baker | 1943 | Organization of American States 38°53′33.3″N 77°2′27.4″W | Bronze | Sculpture: approx. 33 × 25 × 13 in.; Base: approx. 51 × 27 × 27 in. | Organization of American States | |
| The Prophet Daniel | Aleijadinho | 1962 | Organization of American States 38°53′36.2″N 77°2′23.9″W | Concrete | Sculpture: 8 ft. 31 in. × 33 in.; Base: approx. 2 1/2 ft. × 30 in. c 27 in. | Organization of American States | |
| Statue of Isabella I of Castile | José Luis Sánchez | 1966 | Organization of American States 38°53′34.3″N 77°2′22.8″W | Bronze | Approx. H. 12 ft.; Base: 40 × 40 in. (900 lbs.). | Organization of American States | |
| José Cecilio del Valle | Juan José Sicre | 1967 | Organization of American States 38°53′35.4″N 77°2′27.4″W | Bronze & Granite | Sculpture: approx. 25 × 20 × 13 in.; Base: approx. 63 × 22 1/2 × 17 1/2 in. | Organization of American States | |
| Rubén Darío | Juan José Sicre | 1967 | Organization of American States 38°53′33.5″N 77°2′25.3″W | Bronze & Concrete | Sculpture: approx. 44 × 64 × 24 1/2 in.; Base: approx. 30 1/2 × 60 × 15 in. | Organization of American States | |
| Sor Juana Inés de la Cruz | Beatriz Caso | 1975 | Organization of American States 38°53′32.6″N 77°2′26.4″W | Bronze & Concrete | Sculpture: approx. 48 × 43 1/2 × 35 in.; Base: approx. 32 × 50 × 38 in. | Organization of American States | |
| Rómulo Gallegos | Juan Jose Sicre | Cast 1979 | Organization of American States 38°53′33.2″N 77°2′24.7″W | Bronze & Granite | Sculpture: approx. 14 × 8 1/2 × 11 in.; Base: approx. 4 ft. 10 in. × 2 ft. × 2 ft. | Organization of American States | |
| Duality | Salvador Manzano | 1980 | Organization of American States 38°53′32.6″N 77°2′26.6″W | Painted Metal | Sculpture: approx. 56 × 39¾ × 65 in. | Organization of American States | |
| Gabriela Mistral | Galvarino Ponce | 1980 | Organization of American States 38°53′33.2″N 77°2′25.7″W | Lead & Granite | Sculpture: approx. 27 1/2 × 22 × 13 in.; Base: approx. 43 × 24 × 24 in. | Organization of American States | |
| Pablo Neruda | Galvarino Ponce | 1980 | Organization of American States 38°53′33.2″N 77°2′26.0″W | Lead & Granite | Sculpture: approx. 30 × 24 × 16 in.; Base: approx. 52 1/4 × 24 × 24 in. | Organization of American States | |
| Presence on the Path | Beatriz Blanco | 1982 | Organization of American States 38°53′32.8″N 77°2′26.7″W | Cor-Ten Steel | Sculpture: approx. 77¾ × 48 × 27 1/2 in.; Steel plate base: D. 38 in. Diam 48 in. | Organization of American States | |
| Simon Bolivar, Libertador | Emile Antoine Bourdelle | 1984 | Organization of American States 38°53′34.3″N 77°2′26.7″W | Bronze | Sculpture: approx. 3 × 1 1/2 × 3 1/2 ft.; Base: approx. 4 1/2 × 3 × 4 ft. | Organization of American States | |
| Teresa de la Parra | M. de la Fujite | 1989 | Organization of American States 38°53′33.2″N 77°2′24.9″W | Bronze & Granite | Sculpture: approx. 22 × 15 × 11 in.; Base: approx. 49 1/2 × 24 1/2 × 24 1/2 in. | Organization of American States | |
| Inuksuk | Peter Irniq | 2010 | Organization of American States 38°53′32.7″N 77°2′24.6″W | | | Organization of American States | |
| Angel de la Paz | José Toledo Ordoñez | 2014 | Organization of American States 38°53′33.1″N 77°2′27.4″W | | | Organization of American States | |
| La Niña | John Castles | 2000 | Organization of American States, Administration Building 38°53′33.0″N 77°2′31.2″W | Steel | | Organization of American States | |
| The Founders of the Daughters of the American Revolution | Gertrude Vanderbilt Whitney | c. 1928 | Daughters of the American Revolution Museum 38°53′37.4″N 77°2′25.8″W | Marble | Figure: approx. H. 9 ft; Stele: approx. H. 5 ft. 9 in. × 18 ft. × 5 ft. 5 in. | Daughters of the American Revolution | |
| Murillo | Renato Lucchetti after Moses Jacob Ezekiel | 1974 | Renwick Gallery facade 38°53′57.18″N 77°2′21.45″W | Marble Dust Conglomerate | Sculpture: approx. 8 ft. 7 in. × 3 ft. 8 in.; Base: approx. 6 ft. 7 in. × 4 ft. 10 in. | Smithsonian American Art Museum | |
| Rubens | Renato Lucchetti after Moses Jacob Ezekiel | 1974 | Renwick Gallery facade 38°53′57.18″N 77°2′21.5″W | Marble Dust Conglomerate | H. 7 ft. | Smithsonian American Art Museum | |
| Indian Heads | Alexander Phimister Proctor | 1914 | Dumbarton Bridge 38°54′39.0″N 77°3′4.0″W | Sandstone | | Department of Public Works | |
| Discus Thrower | Myron | 1956 | Kelly Park 38°53′41.53″N 77°2′47.08″W | Bronze, Marble & Granite | Figure: life-size; Column and base: approx. 10 ft. 6 in. × 5 ft. 10 in. × 5 ft. 10 in. | United States Department of the Interior | |
| Admiral David G. Farragut (Ream statue) | Vinnie Ream | 1881 | Farragut Square 38°54′7″N 77°2′20.3″W | Bronze & Granite | Sculpture: approx. 10 × 3 × 3 ft.; Base: approx. 16 × 18 × 24 ft. | United States Department of the Interior | |
| Eagle Pediment and Neoclassical Relief Panels | Ulysses Ricci | 1929 | DAR Constitution Hall 38°53′38.2″N 77°2′29.5″W | Limestone | Eagle: larger than life-size. Each relief panel: H. 4 ft. × W. 8 ft. | Daughters of the American Revolution | |
| Balinese Demons | Unknown | c. 1870 | Indonesian Embassy 38°54′37.3″N 77°2′46.4″W | Volcanic rock | 2 pieces. Each sculpture: approx. H. 5 ft. Diam. 3 ft. | Indonesian Embassy | |
| Lieutenant General George Washington | Clark Mills | 1860 | Washington Circle 38°54′9.1″N 77°3′0.4″W | Bronze & Marble | Sculpture: approx. 9 × 14 × 6 ft.; Base: approx. 9 ft. 8 in. × 15 ft. × 8 ft. | National Park Service | |
| Transportation | John Gregory | 1937 | Eccles Building 38°53′36.2″N 77°2′44.7″W | Marble | Approx. H. 10 ft. | Federal Reserve Board | |
| Law | John Gregory | 1937 | Eccles Building 38°53′36.2″N 77°2′45.1″W | Marble | Approx. H. 10 ft. | Federal Reserve Board | |
| Eagle on the Federal Reserve Board Building | Sidney Waugh | 1937 | Eccles Building 38°53′33.8″N 77°2′44.9″W | Marble | Sculpture: 6 ft. 11 in. × 6 ft. 1 in. × 6 ft. 8 in. | Federal Reserve Board | |
| Andrew Jackson Downing | Robert Eberhard Launitz | 1856 | Enid A. Haupt Garden, Smithsonian Institution 38°53′18.2″N 77°1′31.5″W | Marble | Urn: approx. H. 4 ft. Diam 2 ft.; Base: approx. H. 4 ft. 9 in. W. 3 ft. | Smithsonian Institution | |
| Elephants | Unknown | c. 1955 | Embassy of India Chancellery, 2536 Massachusetts Ave. NW 38°54′58.0″N 77°3′23.3″W | Marble & Stone | Sculpture: approx. 36 × 24 × 72 in.; Base: approx. 8 × 27 × 18 in. | Embassy of India, Washington, D.C. | |
| American Wildlife | Lumen Martin Winter | 1961 | 1412 16th St. NW 38°54′31.6″N 77°2′12.5″W | Marble | 13 reliefs. Each: approx. H. 12 ft. W. 4 ft. | Unknown | |
| The Progress of Science | Lee Lawrie | 1923 | United States National Academy of Sciences 38°53′34.0″N 77°2′52.0″W | Bronze | 6 reliefs. Each relief: approx. H. 5 ft. W. 10 ft. | United States National Academy of Sciences | |
| Wisdom and Observation | Lee Lawrie | 1923 | United States National Academy of Sciences 38°53′34.0″N 77°2′52.0″W | Copper | Cornice sculpture: approx. H. 4 ft. | United States National Academy of Sciences | |
| National Association of Broadcasters Fountain | Loren Sage | 1969 | National Association of Broadcasters 38°54′26.6″N 77°2′29.2″W | Stone & Pebbles | Fountain: approx. 6 × 15 × 7 ft. | National Association of Broadcasters | |
| The Griffin | John Dreyfuss | 1986 | Griffin Condominiums, 955 26th St. NW 38°54′8.0″N 77°3′16.6″W | Bronze & Concrete | Sculpture: approx. 4 ft. 10 in. × 3 ft. 3 in. × 1 ft. 3 in.; Base: approx. 6 in. × 2 ft. 9 in. × 1 ft | | |
| Untitled | Albert Paley | 1981 | 901 26th St. NW 38°54′3.5″N 77°3′16.6″W | Painted Iron | (Left gate:) 8 ft. 4 in. × 10 ft. 2 in. × 1 1/2 in.; (Right gate:) 10 ft. × 4 ft. 2 in. × 1 1/2 in. | Private Residence | |
| (Massachusetts Avenue Abstract) | John Van Alstine | 1986 | 2358 Massachusetts Ave. NW 38°54′8.0″N 77°3′16.6″W | Limestone & Steel | Approx. 8 ft. 5 in. × 2 ft. 4 in. × 5 in. | Patricia Baumann & John Bryant | |
| Expanding Universe | Marshall Fredericks | 1963 | United States State Department 38°54′47.1″N 77°3′8.1″W | Cast Bronze, Nickel Alloys, Glass Mosaic & Granite | 26 × 10 ft. | General Services Administration | |
| Spatial Concept: Nature | Lucio Fontana | 1959–1960 Cast 1965 | Hirshhorn Museum and Sculpture Garden 38°53′18.6″N 77°1′24.0″W | Bronze | 5 spheres. Height ranges from 29 to 36 5/8. Diam. ranges from 35 to 43 3/8 in. | Smithsonian Institution | |
| Horse and Rider | Marino Marini (sculptor) | 1952–1953 | Hirshhorn Museum and Sculpture Garden 38°53′21.0″N 77°1′22.6″W | Bronze | 82 1/4 X 47 X 77 3/4 IN | Smithsonian Institution | |
| Are Years What? (for Marianne Moore) | Mark di Suvero | 1967 | Hirshhorn Museum and Sculpture Garden 38°53′20.2″N 77°1′24.4″W | Painted steel | 480 × 480 × 360 in. | Smithsonian Institution | |
| Antipodes | James Sanborn | 1997 | Hirshhorn Museum and Sculpture Garden 38°53′16.7″N 77°1′21.6″W | Copper & Petrified wood | approx. 96 × 75 × 26 in. | Smithsonian Institution | |
| Figure | Jacques Lipchitz | 1926–1930 Cast 1958–1961 | Hirshhorn Museum and Sculpture Garden 38°53′21.0″N 77°1′24.8″W | Bronze | 85 3/8 × 38 1/2 × 29 1/4 IN. | Smithsonian Institution | |
| Sunset Song | Susan Philipsz | 2003 | Hirshhorn Museum and Sculpture Garden 38°53′20.6″N 77°1′24.5″W | Sound installation | | Smithsonian Institution | |
| For Gordon Bunshaft | Dan Graham | 2006 Fabricated 2007–2008 | Hirshhorn Museum and Sculpture Garden 38°53′20.3″N 77°1′22.5″W | Two-way mirror, Stainless steel, wood, & stone | 92 1/8 × 196 1/4 × 196 1/8 in. | Smithsonian Institution | |
| Wish Tree for Washington, DC | Yoko Ono | 2007 | Hirshhorn Museum and Sculpture Garden | Live tree with mixed media | Dimensions variable | Smithsonian Institution | |
| Brushstroke | Roy Lichtenstein | 1996 Cast 2002–2003 | Hirshhorn Museum and Sculpture Garden 38°53′18.9″N 77°1′22.8″W | Painted aluminum | 32 1/4 × 21 1/2 × 6 ft. | Smithsonian Institution | |
| Sky Hooks | Alexander Calder | c. 1962 | Hirshhorn Museum and Sculpture Garden 38°53′20.2″N 77°1′22.8″W | Painted steel | 103 × 83 × 92 in. | Smithsonian Institution | |
| Kiepenkerl | Jeff Koons | 1987 | Hirshhorn Museum and Sculpture Garden 38°53′19.8″N 77°1′22.9″W | Stainless steel | 72¾ × 31 1/2 × 32 1/4 in. | Smithsonian Institution | |
| Sphere No. 6 | Arnaldo Pomodoro | 1966 | Hirshhorn Museum and Sculpture Garden 38°53′20.1″N 77°1′23.7″W | Bronze | 45 × 46 1/2 × 47 5/8 in. | Smithsonian Institution | |
| Young Girl on a Chair | Giacomo Manzu | 1955 | Hirshhorn Museum and Sculpture Garden 38°53′21.0″N 77°1′22.1″W | Bronze | 45 × 23 3/8 × 43¾ in. | Smithsonian Institution | |
| Self-Portrait with Model at Bergamo | Giacomo Manzu | 1942 Cast 1960 | Hirshhorn Museum and Sculpture Garden 38°53′20.5″N 77°1′20.4″W | Bronze | 52 1/4 × 38 5/8 × 10 1/8 in. | Smithsonian Institution | |
| Two-Piece Reclining Figure: Points | Henry Moore | 1969–1970 Cast 1973 | Hirshhorn Museum and Sculpture Garden 38°53′20.6″N 77°1′20.1″W | Bronze | 89 3/8 × 147 1/8 × 72 7/8 in. | Smithsonian Institution | |
| Three-Piece No. 3: Vertebrae (Working Model) | Henry Moore | 1968 Cast 1969 | Hirshhorn Museum and Sculpture Garden 38°53′21.0″N 77°1′23.1″W | Bronze | 40¾ × 93 × 48 in. | Smithsonian Institution | |
| Evocation of a Form: Human, Lunar, Spectral | Jean Arp | 1950 Cast 1957 | Hirshhorn Museum and Sculpture Garden 38°53′20.1″N 77°1′23.2″W | Bronze | 45 1/2 × 32 3/8 × 33 1/2 in. | Smithsonian Institution | |
| Lunar Bird | Joan Miró | 1944–1946 | Hirshhorn Museum and Sculpture Garden 38°53′20.8″N 77°1′24.5″W | Bronze | 89 3/8 × 88 1/2 × 58 1/4 in. | Smithsonian Institution | |
| Seated Yucatan Woman | Francisco Zúñiga | 1973 | Hirshhorn Museum and Sculpture Garden 38°53′20.9″N 77°1′21.5″W | Bronze | 41 1/2 × 35 3/8 × 44 7/8 in. | Smithsonian Institution | |
| Clamdigger | Willem de Kooning | 1972 Cast 1976 | Hirshhorn Museum and Sculpture Garden 38°53′20.9″N 77°1′21.9″W | Bronze | 59 1/2 × 29 5/8 × 23¾ in. | Smithsonian Institution | |
| Seated Woman on a Bench | Willem de Kooning | 1972 Cast 1976 | Hirshhorn Museum and Sculpture Garden 38°53′20.9″N 77°1′22.4″W | Bronze | 37¾ × 36 × 34 3/8 in. | Smithsonian Institution | Link to image |
| Crouching Woman | Auguste Rodin | 1880–1882 Cast 1962 | Hirshhorn Museum and Sculpture Garden | Bronze | 37 1/2 × 27 5/8 × 24 1/4 in. | Smithsonian Institution | |
| Post-Balzac | Judith Shea | 1991 | Hirshhorn Museum and Sculpture Garden 38°53′19.9″N 77°1′23.9″W | Bronze | 98 1/2 × 28 1/2 × 28 1/2 in. | Smithsonian Institution | |
| The Drummer | Barry Flanagan | 1990 | Hirshhorn Museum and Sculpture Garden 38°53′20.2″N 77°1′21.4″W | Bronze | 96 × 68 × 36 in. | Smithsonian Institution | |
| Eros, Inside Eros | Arman | 1986 | Hirshhorn Museum and Sculpture Garden 38°53′20.1″N 77°1′23.4″W | Bronze | 33 5/8 × 17 1/4 × 20 1/8 in. | Smithsonian Institution | |
| Three-Piece Reclining Figure No. 2: Bridge Prop | Henry Moore | 1964 | Hirshhorn Museum and Sculpture Garden 38°53′20.5″N 77°1′23.2″W | Bronze | 49 1/2 × 78 1/2 × 58 1/2 in. | Smithsonian Institution | |
| Upright Motive No. 1: Glenkiln Cross | Henry Moore | 1956 | Hirshhorn Museum and Sculpture Garden 38°53′20.1″N 77°1′20.0″W | Bronze | 131 3/8 × 38 3/8 × 36 in. | Smithsonian Institution | |
| Seated Woman | Henry Moore | 1957 | Hirshhorn Museum and Sculpture Garden 38°53′20.2″N 77°1′22.1″W | Bronze | 62 × 56 1/4 × 41 3/8 in. | Smithsonian Institution | |
| Draped Reclining Figure | Henry Moore | 1956 | Hirshhorn Museum and Sculpture Garden 38°53′20.6″N 77°1′22.1″W | Bronze | 40 7/8 × 66 5/8 × 34 1/8 in. | Smithsonian Institution | |
| Nymph (Central Figure for "The Three Graces") | Aristide Maillol | 1953 | Hirshhorn Museum and Sculpture Garden | Bronze | 60 7/8 × 24 1/2 × 18¾ in | Smithsonian Institution | |
| Needle Tower | Kenneth Snelson | 1968 | Hirshhorn Museum and Sculpture Garden 38°53′16.4″N 77°1′21.0″W | Stainless steel & Aluminum | 720 × 243 1/2 × 213 3/8 in. | Smithsonian Institution | |
| Cubi XII | David Smith | 1963 | Hirshhorn Museum and Sculpture Garden 38°53′20.5″N 77°1′25.1″W | Stainless steel | 109 1/2 × 49 × 26 in. | Smithsonian Institution | |
| Agricola I | David Smith | 1952 | Hirshhorn Museum and Sculpture Garden | Painted steel | 73¾ × 54¾ × 23¾ in. | Smithsonian Institution | |
| Geometric Mouse, Variation I, Scale A | Claes Oldenburg | 1971 | Hirshhorn Museum and Sculpture Garden 38°53′18.6″N 77°1′21.1″W | Painted steel & Aluminum | 106 1/4 × 143 3/8 × 94 3/8 in. | Smithsonian Institution | |
| Pittsburgh Landscape | David Smith | 1954 | Hirshhorn Museum and Sculpture Garden 38°53′20.8″N 77°1′24.2″W | Stainless steel & Bronze | 30 × 116 × 5 in. | Smithsonian Institution | |
| The Great Warrior of Montauban | Antoine Bourdelle | 1900/1956 | Hirshhorn Museum and Sculpture Garden | Bronze | 73 1/4 × 62 × 24 1/8 in. | Smithsonian Institution | |
| Back I-Back IV | Henri Matisse | 1909–1931 Cast 1959–1960 | Hirshhorn Museum and Sculpture Garden | Bronze | 4 panels. Varied dimensions. | Smithsonian Institution | |
| Monument to Balzac | Auguste Rodin | 1898 Cast: 1966 | Hirshhorn Museum and Sculpture Garden 38°53′20.62″N 77°1′21.29″W | Bronze | 106 × 43 × 50 3/8 in. | Smithsonian Institution | |
| Last Conversation Piece | Juan Muñoz | 1995 | Hirshhorn Museum and Sculpture Garden 38°53′16.4″N 77°1′24.1″W | Bronze | 3 pieces. Installation, overall: 66 1/2 × 244¾ × 321 1/8 in. | Smithsonian Institution | |
| Subcommittee | Tony Cragg | 1991 | Hirshhorn Museum and Sculpture Garden 38°53′17.5″N 77°1′24.5″W | Steel | 100 1/2 × 74 1/4 × 64 1/2 in. | Smithsonian Institution | |
| Throwback | Tony Smith | 1979 | Hirshhorn Museum and Sculpture Garden | Painted Aluminum | 81 1/4 × 155 7/8 × 95 5/8 in. | Smithsonian Institution | |
| Voltri XV | David Smith | 1962 | Hirshhorn Museum and Sculpture Garden 38°53′20.3″N 77°1′23.9″W 38°53′18″N 77°1′23″W | Steel | 89 7/8 × 77 14 × 22 5/8 in. | Smithsonian Institution | |
| Monumental Head | Alberto Giacometti | 1960 | Hirshhorn Museum and Sculpture Garden 38°53′20.2″N 77°1′21.1″W | Bronze | 37 × 11¾ × 14¾ in. | Smithsonian Institution | |
| Untitled | Ellsworth Kelly | 1986 | Hirshhorn Museum and Sculpture Garden | Stainless Steel | 75 × 30 × 107 in. | Smithsonian Institution | |
| Monsoon Drift | Anthony Caro | 1975 | Hirshhorn Museum and Sculpture Garden 38°53′20.9″N 77°1′25.1″W | Stainless Steel | 123 1/4 × 207 × 41 in. | Smithsonian Institution | |
| Figure for Landscape | Barbara Hepworth | 1965 | Hirshhorn Museum and Sculpture Garden 38°53′21.1″N 77°1′20.1″W | Bronze | 106 1/2 × 53 7/8 × 28 3/8 in. | Smithsonian Institution | |
| Angola II | Isaac Witkin | 1968 | Hirshhorn Museum and Sculpture Garden 38°53′20.0″N 77°1′25.1″W | Steel | 102 1/2 x 100 x 45 3/8 in. | Smithsonian Institution | |
| Crown Princess Märtha | Kirsten Kokkin | 2005 | Norwegian Embassy 38°55′28.2″N 77°3′0.0″W | Bronze | | | |
| DuPont Circle Fountain | Daniel Chester French | 1920 | Dupont Circle 38°54′34.7″N 77°2′36.4″W | Marble & Concrete | Upper basin: approx. H. 3 ft. D. 11 ft. 6 in.; Lower Basin: approx. H. 1 ft. 8 in.; Pedestal: approx. H. 13 ft. D. 7 ft. 6 in.; Overall: H. approx. 16 ft; Each figure: approx. H. 8 ft. W. 4 1/2 ft. | United States Department of the Interior | |
| Second Division Memorial | James Earle Fraser | 1936 | President's Park 38°53′33.3″N 77°2′16.7″W | Gilded Bronze & Granite | Sculpture: approx. 18 ft. × 3 ft. 10 in. × 2 ft. 4 in.; Base: approx. 20 × 71 × 26 ft. | United States Department of the Interior | |
| General William Tecumseh Sherman Monument | Carl Rohl-Smith, Sigvald Asbjornsen, Theo Alice Ruggles Kitson, Stephen Abel Sinding & Lauritz Jensen | 1898 | President's Park 38°53′45.6″N 77°2′03.5″W | Bronze & Granite | Overall: approx. H. 42 ft.; Equestrian figure: approx. H. 14 ft. | United States Department of the Interior | |
| Brigadier General Thaddeus Kosciuszko | Antoni Popiel | 1910 | Lafayette Park 38°54′0.06″N 77°2′7.41″W | Bronze & Granite | Sculpture: approx. 10 × 4 × 4 ft.; Base: approx. 15 × 20 × 20 ft. | United States Department of the Interior | |
| Major General Comte Jean de Rochambeau | Fernand Hamar | 1901 | Lafayette Park 38°53′56.42″N 77°2′15.82″W | Bronze & Granite | Sculpture: approx. H. 8 ft. Diam. 6 ft.; Base: approx. 20 ft. × 12 ft. 2 in. × 12 ft. 2 in. | United States Department of the Interior | |
| Andrew Jackson | Clark Mills | 1852 | Lafayette Park 38°53′58.3″N 77°2′11.6″W | Bronze & Granite | Sculpture: approx. H. 9 ft. W. 12 ft.; Base: approx. 18 × 16.5 × 9.75 ft. | United States Department of the Interior | |
| Major General Friedrich Wilhelm von Steuben | Albert Jaegers | 1910 | Lafayette Park 38°54′0.02″N 77°2′15.78″W | Bronze & Granite | Sculpture: approx. 10 × 5 × 5 ft.; Base: approx. 15 × 20 × 20 ft. | United States Department of the Interior | |
| Major General Marquis Gilbert de Lafayette | Alexandre Falguière | 1890 | Lafayette Park 38°53′56.5″N 77°2′7.4″W | Bronze, Marble | Sculpture: approx. 10 × 4 × 4 ft.; Base: approx. 15 × 20 × 20 ft. | United States Department of the Interior | |
| The Three Soldiers | Frederick Hart | 1984 | Constitution Gardens 38°53′26.0″N 77°2′53.4″W | Bronze & Granite | Sculpture: approx. 8 × 5 × 3 ft.: Base: approx. 2.5 × 12 × 8 ft. | United States Department of the Interior | |
| Vietnam Women's Memorial | Glenna Goodacre | 1993 | Constitution Gardens 38°53′26.2″N 77°2′49.1″W | Bronze & Granite | Sculpture: approx. 80 × 95 × 70 in.; Base: approx. H. 8 × Diam. 116 in. | United States Department of the Interior | |
| Vietnam Veterans Memorial | Maya Lin | 1982 | Constitution Gardens 38°53′26.2″N 77°2′49.1″W | Granite | Each wall: approx. H. 10 ft. 1 in. × L. 246.75 ft. | United States Department of the Interior | |
| Memorial to the 56 Signers of the Declaration of Independence | Joseph Brown | 1976 | Constitution Gardens 38°53′27.9″N 77°2′34.4″W | Granite, Gold Leaf, Concrete piers, Brass & Wood | Sculpture: approx. 2 ft. 5 1/2 in. × 50 ft. × 4 ft. 3 in. | United States Department of the Interior | |
| Major General George B. McClellan | Frederick William MacMonnies | 1907 | Connecticut Ave. & Columbia Rd. NW 38°55′0.1″N 77°2′47.4″W | Bronze & Granite | Sculpture: 13 ft. 6 in.; Pedestal: 18 × 9 1/2 ft.; Base: 44 × 30 ft. | United States Department of the Interior | |
| Boy Scout Memorial | Donald De Lue | 1964 | The Ellipse 38°53′37.93″N 77°2′3.38″W | Bronze & Granite | Sculpture: approx. 168 × 120 × 104 in.; Base: approx. 62 × 92 × 98 in. | United States Department of the Interior | |
| Zero Milestone | Horace Peaslee | 1923 | The Ellipse 38°53′42.38757″N 77°2′11.57375″W | Bronze & Granite | Overall: approx. H. 3 ft. 9 1/2 in. W. 2 ft. | United States Department of the Interior | |
| First Division Memorial | Daniel Chester French | 1924 | The Ellipse 38°53′46.2″N 77°2′19.3″W | Bronze & Granite | Overall: approx. H. 80 ft.; Figure of Victory: approx. H. 15 ft. | United States Department of the Interior | |
| Robert Emmet | Jerome Connor | 1916 | Massachusetts Ave. & 24th St. NW 38°54′50.1″N 77°3′9.9″W | Bronze & Granite | Sculpture: approx. 82 × 38 × 23 in.; Base: approx. 5 × 4 × 4 ft. | Smithsonian American Art Museum | |
| Major General George Henry Thomas | John Quincy Adams Ward | 1879 | Thomas Circle 38°54′20.4″N 77°1′55.0″W | Bronze & Granite | Sculpture: approx. 16 × 15 × 5 1/2; Base: approx. 178 in. × 30 ft. 10 in. × 12 ft. 3 in. | United States Department of the Interior | |
| Commodore John Barry | John Boyle | 1913 | Franklin Park 38°54′07.0″N 77°1′54.1″W | Bronze, Marble, Granite | Sculpture: approx. H. 6 ft.; Base: approx. H. 8 ft. D. 4 ft. | United States Department of the Interior | |
| Daniel Webster | Gaetano Trentanove | 1898 | Scott Circle 38°54′26.1″N 77°2′14.3″W | Bronze & Granite | Sculpture: approx. 7 × 4 × 3 ft.; Base: approx. 17 × 14 × 14 ft. | United States Department of the Interior | |
| Brevet Lt. General Winfield Scott | Henry Kirke Brown | 1874 | Scott Circle 38°54′26.1″N 77°2′11.5″W | Bronze & Granite | Sculpture: approx. 15 × 10 × 10 ft.; Base: approx. 2 × 24 × 30 ft. | United States Department of the Interior | |
| Samuel Hahnemann Monument | Charles Henry Niehaus | 1896 | Scott Circle 38°54′26.1″N 77°2′8.6″W | Bronze, Marble & Ceramic | Figure: 6 × 2 1/2 × 3 ft. Exedra: 25 × 36 × 24 ft. Base Relief Panels: H. 4 ft. W. 10 ft. each | United States Department of the Interior | |
| General Philip Sheridan | Gutzon Borglum | 1908 | Sheridan Circle 38°54′43.8″N 77°3′2.4″W | Bronze | Sculpture: approx. 10 × 12 ft. × 5 ft.; Base: approx. 3 × 37 × 4 ft. | United States Department of the Interior | |
| Henry Wadsworth Longfellow | William Couper, Thomas Ball | 1908 | Triangle at Connecticut Ave., M St., & 18th St. NW 38°54′21.1″N 77°2′29.4″W | Bronze | Sculpture: approx. 5 ft. × 39 in. × 56 in.; Base: approx. 4 in. × 39 in. × 56 in. | United States Department of the Interior | |
| Doctor John Witherspoon | William Couper | 1909 | Connecticut Ave. & N St. NW 38°54′25.8″N 77°2′30.4″W | Bronze | Sculpture: approx. 8 ft. × 2 ft. 2 in. × 2 ft. 2 in.; Base: approx. 9 × 7 × 7 ft. | United States Department of the Interior | |
| Butt–Millet Memorial Fountain | Thomas Hastings, Daniel Chester French | 1913 | The Ellipse 38°53′43.0″N 77°2′14.8″W | Marble | Sculpture: approx. H. 130 in. Diam. 97 in.; Base: approx. H. 12 ft. Diam. 16 ft. | United States Department of the Interior | |
| Australian Seal | Thomas Bass | 1969 | Embassy of Australia 38°54′27.7″N 77°2′12.9″W | Bronze | Sculpture: approx. 8 × 5 × 2 ft. | Embassy of Australia | |
| General Jose Gervasio Artigas | Juan Manuel Blanes | 1940s | Constitution Ave. & 18th St. NW 38°53′32.4″N 77°2′29.4″W | Bronze | Sculpture: approx. 9 ft. × 63 in. × 65 in.; Base: approx. 58 × 50 × 50 in. | United States Department of the Interior | |
| Japanese Pagoda | Unknown | 17th century | West Potomac Park 38°52′57.3″N 77°2′28.4″W | Granite & Concrete | Sculpture: overall approx. H. 8 ft. W. 4 ft. (3,800 lbs.). | United States Department of the Interior | |
| Japanese Lantern | Unknown | 1651 | West Potomac Park 38°52′59.1″N 77°2′29.4″W | Granite | Sculpture: approx. H. 10 ft. Diam 2 ft.; Base: approx. H. 5 ft. | United States Department of the Interior | |
| District of Columbia War Memorial | Frederick H. Brooke | 1931 | West Potomac Park 38°53′15.4″N 77°2′36.6″W | Bronze | H. 47 ft. × Diam 44 ft. | United States Department of the Interior | |
| Wedlock | Barry Johnston | | Lafayette Center, 1120 20th St. NW 38°54′16.3″N 77°2′42.4″W | Bronze | | Lafayette Center | |
| Albert Einstein Memorial | Robert Berks | 1979 | National Academy of the Sciences 38°53′32.8″N 77°2′54.4″W | Bronze | | National Academy of the Sciences | |
| Theodore Roosevelt Memorial | Paul Manship, Eric Gugler | 1967 | Roosevelt Island 38°53′50.7″N 77°3′50.2″W 38°53′50″N 77°3′51″W | Bronze | | United States Department of the Interior | |
| American Pharmaceutical Association Reliefs | Ulysses Ricci | 1934 | American Institute of Pharmacy Building 38°53′33.9″N 77°2′58.1″W | Vermont marble | | American Pharmacists Association | |
| The Arts of Peace: Aspiration and Literature | James Earle Fraser | 1950 | Rock Creek Parkway 38°53′24.2″N 77°3′7.4″W | Gilded bronze | Sculpture: approx. 17 × 12 × 17 ft.; Base: approx. 18 × 15 × 18 ft. (13 tons). | United States Department of the Interior | |
| The Arts of Peace: Music and Harvest | James Earle Fraser | 1950 | Rock Creek Parkway 38°53′23.3″N 77°3′7.9″W | Gilded bronze | Sculpture: approx. 17 × 12 × 17 ft.; Base: approx. 18 × 15 × 18 ft. (13 tons). | United States Department of the Interior | |
| The Arts of War: Sacrifice | Leo Friedlander | 1950 | Arlington Memorial Bridge 38°53′19.4″N 77°3′7.7″W | Gilded bronze | Sculpture: approx. 17 × 12 × 17 ft.; Base: approx. 18 × 15 × 18 ft. | United States Department of the Interior | |
| The Arts of War: Valor | Leo Friedlander | 1950 | Arlington Memorial Bridge 38°53′18.5″N 77°3′7.2″W | Gilded bronze | Sculpture: approx. 17 × 12 × 17 ft.; Base: approx. 18 × 15 × 18 ft. | United States Department of the Interior | |
| Electricity, Fidelity, Steam | Guido Butti | 1856 | 701 E St. NW 38°53′48.1″N 77°1′22.1″W | Marble | | former General (Old) Post Office, as of 2002 Hotel Monaco | |
| Masonic Sphinxes: Power and Wisdom | Adolph Alexander Weinman | 1915 | Supreme Council 33 – Scottish Rite of Freemasonry 38°54′49.3″N 77°2′10.2″W | Indiana limestone | 2 sphinxes. Each sphinx: approx. 7 ft. × 5 ft. × 15 ft. 10 in.; Each base: approx. 2 ft. 3 in. × 10 ft. 2 in. × 18 ft. 1 1/2 in. | Scottish Rite of Freemasonry | |
| War | Richard von Ezdorf | 1884 | Old Executive Office Building 38°53′53.6″N 77°2′19.4″W | Iron | Pediment: approx. H. 8 ft. W. 30 ft. | United States Department of the Interior | |
| The Light of Knowledge | Philip Martiny | 1903 | Historical Society of Washington 38°54′8.9″N 77°1′22.6″W | Marble | Approx. H. 4 ft. W. 6 ft. | Historical Society of Washington | |
| George Washington | Jean Antoine Houdon | 1932 | George Washington University Campus, University Yard 38°53′57.8″N 77°2′44.8″W | Bronze | Sculpture: approx.6 ft. 8 in. × 32.5 in. × 30 in.; Base: approx.46 × 48.5 × 42 in. | George Washington University | |
| George Washington | Avard Fairbanks | 1975 | George Washington University Campus 38°54′2.5″N 77°3′1.2″W | Bronze | Sculpture: approx. 46 × 32 × 27 in.; Base: approx. 68 × 42 1/2 × 33 in. | George Washington University | |
| Benjamin Rush (1745–1813) | Roland Hinton Perry | 1904 | Surgeon General of the United States Navy 38°53′43.3″N 77°3′5.2″W | Bronze | Overall: H. 14 ft. | Surgeon General of the United States Navy | |
| Professor Joseph Henry | William Wetmore Story | 1882 | Smithsonian Institution Building 38°53′21.0″N 77°1′33.6″W | Bronze | H. 9 ft. | Smithsonian Institution | |
| John Ericsson | James Earle Fraser | 1927 | West Potomac Park 38°53′12″N 77°3′0.68″W | Granite | Sculpture: approx. H. 17 ft. Diam 8 ft.; Base: approx. 5 ft. 5 in. × 18 ft. 6 in. × 22 ft.; Ericsson: approx. 7 ft. 6 in. × 4 ft. 6 in. × 4 ft. 3 in. | United States Department of the Interior | |
| Canova Lions | Antonio Canova | 1860 | Corcoran Gallery of Art 38°53′45.0″N 77°2′22.6″W | Bronze | 2 lions. Each lion: approx. 43 × 31 1/2 × 90 1/2 feet; Each base: approx. 10¾ × 27¾ × 81 1/2 in. | Corcoran Gallery of Art | |
| Braque Bird | Pierre Bourdelle | 1960 | The Phillips Collection 38°54′42.6″N 77°2′48.4″W | Marble | Sculpture: approx. H. 3 ft. L. 7 1/2 ft. | The Phillips Collection | |
| Alexander Hamilton | James Earle Fraser | 1922 | Treasury Building 38°53′47.98″N 77°2′3.51″W | Bronze, Granite | Sculpture: approx. 10 ft. × 3 ft. 2 in. × 2 ft. 9 in.; Pedestal: approx. H. 6 ft.; Base: approx. 9 ft. × 26 ft. 5 in. × 25 ft. 10 in. | United States Department of the Interior | |
| Statue of Albert Gallatin | James Earle Fraser | 1941 | United States Treasury Department Office of the Curator, 15th St & Pennsylvania Ave, N.W. 38°53′54″N 77°2′4″W | Bronze | Sculpture: approx. H. 8 ft.; Base: approx. H. 4 ft. | United States Treasury Department | |
| Statue of John Carroll | Jerome Connor | 1912 | Healy Hall, Georgetown University 38°54′27.4″N 77°4′20.1″W | Bronze, Granite | Sculpture: approx. 82 × 41 × 70 in.; Base: approx. 57 × 70 × 102 in. | Georgetown University | |
| National Grange Marker | Unknown | 1951 | National Mall 38°53′25.5″N 77°1′4.2″W | Bronze, Granite | Plaque: approx. W. 22 in.; Base: approx. W. 28 in. | United States Department of the Interior | |
| Washington Monument | Robert Mills | 1866 | National Mall 38°53′22.1″N 77°2′6.9″W | Marble, Granite | H. 555 ft. × 5 1/2 in. | United States Department of the Interior | |
| St. Jerome the Priest | Ivan Meštrović | 1954 | Embassy of Croatia 38°54′48.6″N 77°3′8.1″W | Bronze | H. 8 ft × W. 3 ft. | Embassy of Croatia | |
| Settlers of the District of Columbia | Carl C. Mose | 1936 | The Ellipse 38°53′37.9″N 77°2′1.9″W | Granite | H 2 ft. 6 in. × W 3 ft. × D 3 ft. | | |
| Navy Yard Urns | Unknown | 1872 | Lafayette Square 38°53′56.7″N 77°2′11.6″W | Bronze | 2 urns. Each: H. 5 ft. × W. 4 ft. | United States Department of the Interior | |
| Meeting of Recently Elected President Washington and Pierre Charles L'Enfant | Raymond Mason | 1988 | Four Seasons Hotel 38°54′16.0″N 77°3′26.6″W | Synthetic Art Resin, Polyurethane Based Paints | | Four Seasons Hotel | |
| Loss and Regeneration | Joel Shapiro | 1993 | United States Holocaust Museum 38°53′12.4″N 77°1′59.9″W | Bronze | | United States Holocaust Museum | |
| Graft | Roxy Paine | 2009 | National Gallery of Art Sculpture Garden 38°53′27.2″N 77°1′24.6″W | Stainless steel | 45 ft. × 45 ft. | National Gallery of Art | |
| Thinker on a Rock | Barry Flanagan | 1997 | National Gallery of Art Sculpture Garden 38°53′27.9″N 77°1′20.4″W | Bronze | | National Gallery of Art | |
| Four-Sided Pyramid | Sol LeWitt | 1997 | National Gallery of Art Sculpture Garden 38°53′27.2″N 77°1′20.64″W | Concrete blocks & Mortar | 15 ft. 3/8 in. × 33 ft. 1/2 in. × 31 ft. 10 1/4 in. | National Gallery of Art | |
| Chair Transformation Number 20B | Lucas Samaras | 1996 | National Gallery of Art Sculpture Garden 38°53′26.7″N 77°1′21.2″W | Bronze | 11 ft. 10 in. × 2 ft. 1 1/2 in. × 7 ft. 4 in. | National Gallery of Art | |
| Moondog | Tony Smith | 1964 | National Gallery of Art Sculpture Garden 38°53′27.4″N 77°1′21.8″W | Aluminum | 17 ft. 1 1/4 in.x 15 ft. 4 1/4 in. × 15 ft. 4 in. | National Gallery of Art | |
| Cluster of Four Cubes | George Rickey | 1992 | National Gallery of Art Sculpture Garden 38°53′27.8″N 77°1′20.9″W | Stainless steel | Sculpture: 17 ft. 9 in. × 10 ft. 3 in. × 9 ft. 3 in. | National Gallery of Art | |
| Cubi XXVI | David Smith | 1965 | National Gallery of Art Sculpture Garden 38°53′26.8″N 77°1′22.8″W | Steel | 9 ft. 11 1/2 × 12 ft. 7 in. × 2 ft. 1 7/8 in. | National Gallery of Art | |
| Stele II | Ellsworth Kelly | 1973 | National Gallery of Art Sculpture Garden 38°53′29.5″N 77°1′20.4″W | Weathering steel | 10 ft. 6 in. × 9 ft. 10 in. | National Gallery of Art | |
| Untitled | Joel Shapiro | 1989 | National Gallery of Art Sculpture Garden 38°53′29.6″N 77°1′20.8″W | Bronze | 5 ft. 5 in. × 6 ft. 5 in. × 5 ft. 2 1/2 in. | National Gallery of Art | |
| Six-Part Seating | Scott Burton | 1985–1998 | National Gallery of Art Sculpture Garden 38°53′30.5″N 77°1′20.9″W | Polished Granite | 6 parts. Each part: 3 ft. 1 1/2 in. × 1 ft. 5 1/2 in. × 3 ft. 1/2 in. | National Gallery of Art | |
| Aurora | Mark di Suvero | 1992–1993 | National Gallery of Art Sculpture Garden 38°53′29.85″N 77°1′21.41″W | Steel | 16 ft. 4 in. × 19 ft. 6 in. × 26 ft. 8 1/2 in. | National Gallery of Art | |
| Puellae | Magdalena Abakanowicz | 1992 | National Gallery of Art Sculpture Garden 38°53′29.9″N 77°1′21.4″W | Bronze | | National Gallery of Art | |
| Spider | Louise Bourgeois | 1995 | National Gallery of Art Sculpture Garden 38°53′29.9″N 77°1′23.7″W | Metal & Stones | | National Gallery of Art | |
| Personnage Gothique, Oiseau-Eclair | Joan Miró | 1974 Cast 1977 | National Gallery of Art Sculpture Garden 38°53′30.5″N 77°1′24.2″W | Bronze | 14 ft. 9 1/4 in. × 6 ft. 6¾ in. × 5 ft. 3 in. | National Gallery of Art | |
| Typewriter Eraser, Scale X | Claes Oldenburg & Coosje van Bruggen | 1999 | National Gallery of Art Sculpture Garden 38°53′30.2″N 77°1′25.0″W | Painted stainless steel & Fiberglass | 19 ft. 9 1/4 in. × 12 ft. 8 1/2 in. × 11 ft. 4 in. | National Gallery of Art | |
| House I | Roy Lichtenstein | 1996–1998 | National Gallery of Art Sculpture Garden 38°53′26.6″N 77°1′24.1″W | Aluminum | 9 ft. 7 in. × 14 ft. 8 in. × 4 ft. 4 in. (2.921 × 4.470 × 1.321 m). | National Gallery of Art | |
| Cheval Rouge | Alexander Calder | 1974 | National Gallery of Art Sculpture Garden 38°53′27.3″N 77°1′23.7″W | Painted sheet metal | 16 ft. × 19 ft. 7 in. × 19 ft. 7 in. (4.877 × 5.969 × 5.969 m). | National Gallery of Art | |
| Cubi XI | David Smith | 1964 | National Gallery of Art Sculpture Garden 38°53′27.9″N 77°1′20.8″W | Chrome, Nickel, Steel | Sculpture: approx. 92 × 29 × 38 in.; Base: approx. 24 1/2 × 30 × 30 in. | National Gallery of Art | |
| Man with Beard | John Cavanaugh | 1973 | 1736 Corcoran St. NW 38°54′42.4″N 77°2′23.5″W | Hammered Lead | Sculpture: approx. H. 42 in. W. 20 in. | John Cavanaugh Foundation | |
| Fat Lips | John Cavanaugh | 1973 | 1736 Corcoran St. NW 38°54′42.4″N 77°2′23.5″W | Hammered Lead | Sculpture: approx. H. 42 in. W. 20 in. | John Cavanaugh Foundation | |
| Tympanum 1742 Corcoran Street | John Cavanaugh | | 1742 Corcoran St. NW 38°54′42.4″N 77°2′24.2″W | Lead | Relief: approx. H. 2 ft. W. 7 ft. | John Cavanaugh Foundation | |
| Nina and the Saint | John Cavanaugh | 1976 | 1614 Corcoran St. NW 38°54′42.5″N 77°2′14.8″W | Lead | Relief: approx. 36 × 30 × 1 1/2 in. | John Cavanaugh Foundation | |
| Sodom and Gomorrah | John Cavanaugh | | John Cavanaugh Foundation 38°54′53.62″N 77°2′31.22″W | Lead | 64 × 34 × 8 in. | John Cavanaugh Foundation | |
| The Captive | John Cavanaugh | | John Cavanaugh Foundation 38°54′53.62″N 77°2′31.18″W | Lead | 64 × 34 × 8 in. | John Cavanaugh Foundation | |
| Time Recaptured | John Cavanaugh | | John Cavanaugh Foundation 38°54′53.6″N 77°2′30.8″W | Lead | 64 × 46 × 8 1/2 in. | John Cavanaugh Foundation | |
| Within a Budding Grove | John Cavanaugh | | John Cavanaugh Foundation | Lead | approx. 25 × 53 1/2 × 6 in. | John Cavanaugh Foundation | |
| Swann's Way | John Cavanaugh | | John Cavanaugh Foundation 38°54′53.6″N 77°2′30.7″W | Lead | Relief: approx. 52 × 53 1/2 × 7 in. | John Cavanaugh Foundation | |
| The Fugitive | John Cavanaugh | | John Cavanaugh Foundation 38°54′53.6″N 77°2′31.5″W | Lead | 23 1/2 × 52 × 8 1/2 in. | John Cavanaugh Foundation | |
| Guermantis Way | John Cavanaugh | | John Cavanaugh Foundation 38°54′53.6″N 77°2′30.9″W | Lead | 20 × 51 1/4 × 7 1/2 in. | John Cavanaugh Foundation | |
| John Howard Payne Monument | Unknown | 1883 | Oak Hill Cemetery 38°54′46.4″N 77°3′31.4″W | Marble & Granite | Sculpture: approx. 42 × 18 × 18 in.; Base: approx. 113 × 71 × 71 in. | Oak Hill Cemetery | |
| Bishop William Pinkney Memorial | Unknown | 1883 | Oak Hill Cemetery 38°54′46.4″N 77°3′34.0″W | Marble & Granite | Sculpture: approx. 74 × 36 × 23 in.; Base: approx. 68 × 72 × 72 in. | Oak Hill Cemetery | |
| Spencer Monument | Tiffany & Co. | 1928 | Oak Hill Cemetery 38°54′47.7″N 77°3′34.2″W | Granite | Sculpture: approx. 12 ft. × 70 in. × 46 in. | Oak Hill Cemetery | |
| Van Ness Mausoleum | George Hadfield | 1833 | Oak Hill Cemetery 38°54′43.0″N 77°3′18.3″W | Brick, Sandstone, Concrete | Approx. H. 24 ft. × Diam. 24 ft. | Oak Hill Cemetery | |
| Samuel P. Carter Monument | Bradley and Sons | 1895 | Oak Hill Cemetery 38°54′47.3″N 77°3′25.3″W | Marble | | Oak Hill Cemetery | |
| Morrison Mausoleum | J.F. Manning | 1889 | Oak Hill Cemetery | Gray Granite | Relief: approx. H. 42 in. W. 94 in. | Oak Hill Cemetery | |
| Amor Caritas | | | Oak Hill Cemetery 38°54′46.4″N 77°3′25.2″W | | | Oak Hill Cemetery | |
| Jane A. Delano Memorial | R. Tait McKenzie | 1933 | American Red Cross, Garden Court, 430 17th St, NW 38°53′41.9″N 77°2′26.8″W | Bronze & Marble | H. 7 ft. | American Red Cross | |
| The Red Cross Men and Women Killed in Service | Felix de Weldon | 1959 | American Red Cross, Garden Court, 430 17th St. NW 38°53′41.0″N 77°2′26.8″W | Bronze & Marble | Sculpture: approx. 8 ft. 6 in. × 7 ft. 1/4 in. × 4 ft. 2¾ in.; Base: approx. 35 1/2 in. × 9 ft. 4 in. × 6 ft. 9 in. | American Red Cross | |
| Armenian Earthquake | F. Sogoyan | 1990 | American Red Cross National Headquarters 38°53′42.7″N 77°2′23.9″W | Metal & Granite | Sculpture: approx. 61 × 61 × 140 in.; Base: approx. H. 71 in. × 71 in. | American Red Cross | |
| American Red Cross Nurses | Edmond Romulus Amateis | 1994 | American Red Cross National Headquarters | Limestone | 2 reliefs. Each relief: approx. 7 1/2 ft. × 5 ft. | General Services Administration | |
| Benito Juarez | Enrique Alciati | 1969 | Virginia Ave. & New Hampshire Ave. NW 38°53′55.5″N 77°3′13.1″W | Bronze | Sculpture: approx. 19 ft. × 9 ft. × 3 ft. 6 in.; Base: approx. 11 ft. × 11 ft. 9 in. × 11 ft. (3,600 lbs.). | United States Department of the Interior | |
| The Prophet | Harry Abend | 1960 | Residence of the Venezuelan Ambassador 38°54′54.4″N 77°3′15.4″W | Bronze | Sculpture: approx. 75 × 33 × 16 1/2 in.; Base: approx. 30 × 30 × 30 in. | Embassy of Venezuela | |
| Samuel Gompers Memorial | Robert Ingersoll Aitken | 1933 | Gompers Square 38°54′14.4″N 77°1′35.4″W | Bronze | Sculpture: approx. 8 ft. × 21 ft. 4 in. × 12 ft. 2 in.; Base: approx. 1 ft. 6 in. × 27 ft. × 16 ft. 3 in. | United States Department of Interior | |
| Washington Planning the Battle of Trenton | Edmond Romulus Amateis | 1935 | Andrew W. Mellon Auditorium 38°53′32.6″N 77°1′48.1″W | Indiana limestone | Panel: approx. 9 ft. × 16 ft. × 10 in.; Spandrels: approx. 7 ft. 1 in. × 6 ft. 10 in. | General Services Administration | |
| General John A. Rawlins | Joseph A. Bailly | 1874 | Rawlins Park 38°53′44.5″N 77°2′31.2″W | Bronze | Sculpture: approx. H. 6 ft.; Base: approx. H. 20 ft. D. 4 ft. | United States Department of Interior | |
| Sky Landscape | Louise Nevelson | 1983 | 1101 Vermont Ave. NW 38°54′13.9″N 77°1′58.2″W | Metal | Sculpture: approx. H. 20 ft. W. 7 ft.; Base: approx. H. 1.5 ft. Diam 18 ft. 8 in. | American Medical Association | |
| Ribbons and Jewels | Hazel Rebold | 1991 | Metro Center Station 38°53′54.7″N 77°1′40.6″W | Stained glass wall sconces | | Washington Metro | |
| Scenes from Washington | G. Byron Peck | 2001 | Metro Center Station 38°53′54.7″N 77°1′40.6″W | Mural | | Washington Metro | |
| Solomon's Gate | John Dreyfus | 1993 | James Monroe Building, 2001 Pennsylvania Ave. NW 38°54′5.2″N 77°2′42.9″W | | | | |
| Transit | Wendy Ross | 2007 | Mount Vernon Square Metro Station 38°54′19.7″N 77°1′19.9″W | | | | |
| We Embrace | E. Ethelbert Miller | 2006 | Dupont Circle Metro Station 38°54′39.4″N 77°2′40.6″W | | | | |
| Excerpt from The Wound Dresser by Walt Whitman | | 2007 | Dupont Circle Metro Station 38°54′39.4″N 77°2′40.6″W | Granite | | | |
| Community | Anne Marchand | 2002 | Westminster Playground, 913 Westminster St. NW 38°54′53.9″N 77°1′29.2″W | Mixed Media | | Westminster Neighborhood Association | |
| Play Together and Live as One | Jerome Meadows | 2002 | Westminster Playground, 913 Westminster St. NW 38°54′54.0″N 77°1′28.9″W | | | Westminster Neighborhood Association | |
| Community Rhythms | Alfred J. Smith | 1995 | U Street station 38°55′0.6″N 77°1′44.8″W | | | Washington Metro | |
| Encore | Zachary Oxman | | Florida Ave. & T St. NW 38°54′56.0″N 77°1′14.4″W | | | | |
| Full Count | John Dreyfuss | 1988–1990 | Virginia Ave. & 20th St. NW 38°53′39.8″N 77°2′45.0″W | Bronze | | | |
| Limits of Infinity III | John Safer | 1979 | 2000 block H St. NW at The George Washington University 38°53′55.7″N 77°2′46.0″W | | | | |
| Alexander Pushkin | Alexander Bourganov | 2000 | H St. & 22nd St. NW at The George Washington University 38°53′59.1″N 77°2′55.1″W | Bronze | | | |
| Suffusion | Arthur Carter | 1999 | Lisner Auditorium at The George Washington University 38°53′56.7″N 77°2′49.8″W | | | | |
| Joyce | Sam Maitin | 2000 | Lisner Auditorium at The George Washington University 38°53′56.7″N 77°2′49.1″W | | | | |
| Red Cross Monument | | | American Red Cross National Headquarters 38°53′46.4″N 77°2′42.6″W | | | | |
| Always Becoming | Nora Naranjo-Morse | 2007 | National Museum of the American Indian 38°53′16.2″N 77°1′0.2″W | Dirt, sand, straw, clay, stone, black locust wood, bamboo, grass, and yam vines. | | Smithsonian Institution | |
| Colossal Head 4 | Ignacio Perez Solano | | National Museum of Natural History 38°53′30.7″N 77°1′35.3″W | Volcanic ash | | Smithsonian Institution | |
| Gwenfritz | Alexander Calder | c. 1968 | National Museum of American History 38°53′28.4″N 77°1′52.7″W | Iron | H. 413 3/8 in. | Smithsonian American Art Museum | |
| Infinity | Jose de Rivera | 1967 | National Museum of American History 38°53′27.0″N 77°1′48.1″W | Stainless Steel | Sculpture: 13 1/2 × 8 × 16 ft.; including base: H. 34 ft. (1000 lbs.). | Smithsonian Institution | |
| Daguerre Memorial | Jonathan Scott Hartley | 1890 | National Portrait Gallery 38°53′51.5″N 77°1′19.7″W | Bronze, Granite | Sculpture: approx. H. 11 ft. | National Museum of American History | |
| Delta Solar | Alejandro Otero | | National Air and Space Museum 38°53′16.9″N 77°1′17.4″W | Stainless steel | | Smithsonian Institution | |
| Columbia | Caspar Buberl | 1879–1881 | Arts and Industries Building 38°53′18.9″N 77°1′28.2″W | Zinc | | Smithsonian Institution | |
| Knife Edge Mirror Two Piece | Henry Moore | | National Gallery of Art East Building 38°53′29.1″N 77°1′1.8″W | | | National Gallery of Art | |
| Prinz Friedrich von Homburg, Ein Schauspiel, 3X | Frank Stella | 1998–2001 | National Gallery of Art East Building 38°53′28.4″N 77°0′56.6″W | Stainless steel, Aluminum, Fiberglass & Carbon fiber | | National Gallery of Art | |
| Triceratops horridus | | | National Museum of Natural History 38°53′26.4″N 77°1′28.6″W | Bronze | | Smithsonian Institution | |
| Mahatma Gandhi Memorial | Gautam Pal | | 21st St., Massachusetts Ave., and Q St. NW 38°54′39.7″N 77°2′49.1″W | Bronze & Granite | | | |
| Kenya Coat of Arms | | | Kenyan Embassy 38°54′45.8″N 77°3′1.3″W | | | Embassy of Kenya | |
| Bust of Vasil Levski | | | Bulgarian Embassy 38°54′44.2″N 77°2′55.2″W | | | Bulgarian Embassy | |
| Tomáš Garrigue Masaryk | Vincenc Makovsky | 2002 | Massachusetts & Florida Aves. at Q & 22nd Sts. NW 38°54′40.5″N 77°2′54.9″W | Bronze | | | |
| Bust of Alberto Santos-Dumont | | | Vicinity R & 22nd Sts. NW 38°54′45.7″N 77°2′55.2″W | Bronze | | | |
| Future Stars | Kenneth Valimaki | c. 1991 | National Education Association 38°54′20.8″N 77°2′10.2″W | Bronze & Concrete | | | |
| Golden Warrior Prince | Shota Valikhanov, Klara Sever and Peter Sever | c. 2006 | Embassy of Kazakhstan 38°54′31.9″N 77°2′10.6″W | Bronze | | Embassy of Kazakhstan | |
| Ursus | | | National Geographic Society | | | National Geographic Society | |
| C & O Canal Obelisk | | | Wisconsin Ave. south of M St. NW 38°54′15.7″N 77°3′46.4″W | | | National Park Service? | |
| Helix Fountain | | | 1 block S of M St. between 33rd & 34th Sts., N.W. | | | | |
| John A. Joyce | | | Oak Hill Cemetery 38°54′46.5″N 77°3′23.2″W | | | | |
| Jan Karski | | | Georgetown University 38°54′31.7″N 77°4′18.6″W | | | Georgetown University | |
| Saint Ignatius of Loyola | Vicki Winters Reid | | Georgetown University 38°54′31.8″N 77°4′20.4″W | Bronze | | Georgetown University | |
| Francis Scott Key | | | 34th and M St. NW 38°54′17.3″N 77°4′5.3″W | | | National Park Service | |
| Giant Adirondack Chair | | | Georgetown University 38°54′46.3″N 77°4′11.5″W | | | | |
| Man Helping Man | | | 2400 N St. NW 38°54′25.5″N 77°3′5.8″W | | | | |
| Pulse | Jefre Manuel | | Farragut North metro (entrance on K Street) 38°54′9.9″N 77°2′20.9″W | Refractive tile: Poly(methyl methacrylate) resin or Glass | Sculpture, installation art | Washington Metropolitan Area Transit Authority donated by Golden Triangle (Washington, D.C.) with the DC Commission on the Arts & Humanities | |
| Farragut Spheres | Michael Enn Sirvet | 2011 | Farragut West metro (17th & I NW entrance) 38°54′4.2″N 77°2′20.9″W | Aluminum, Light emitting diodes | Sculpture, installation art | Washington Metropolitan Area Transit Authority donated by Golden Triangle (Washington, D.C.) with the DC Commission on the Arts & Humanities | |
| Pillar of Fire | William Cochran | 2013 | NW corner of 14th and S Streets NW 38°54′51.08″N 77°1′55.71″W | glass, concrete | 16 feet | | |
| Scarlet Natural Chaos | Arne Quinze | 2017 | Washington Harbour (End of 30th St. NW) 38°54′3.6″N 77°3′33.2″W | Metal, Aluminum | Sculpture, installation art | Ark Restaurants | |
| Transformers | Unknown | 2021 | 3614 Prospet Street NW 38°54′20.9″N 77°4′14.3″W | metal | 10 feet | | |
