= Horse and Rider =

Horse and Rider may refer to:

== Astronomy ==
- Horse and Rider (asterism), an informal name given to the stars Mizar and Alcor

== Magazines ==
- Horse & Rider, a monthly magazine in the United States
- Horse&Rider, a magazine published in the United Kingdom

== Sculptures ==
- Horse and Rider (Frink), a modern sculpture by Elisabeth Frink
- Horse and Rider (Marini), a modern equestrian bronze sculpture by Marino Marini
- Horse and Rider (wax sculpture), a wax sculpture attributed to Leonardo da Vinci, c.1508
- Rearing Horse and Mounted Warrior, a bronze sculpture attributed to Leonardo da Vinci, and called Horse and rider by some sources

== See also ==
- Horse (disambiguation)
- Rider (disambiguation)
