= Madeline Masters Stone =

American sculptor

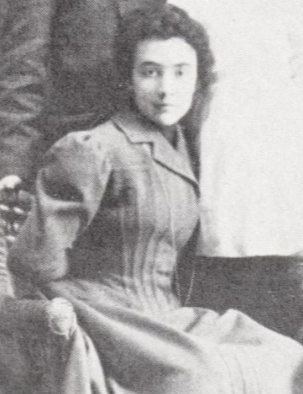
- Born: August 18, 1872; Petersburg
- Died: September 24, 1932; New York City
- Occupation: Sculptor
- Parents: Hardin Wallace Masters (father); Emma Jerusha Masters (mother)
- Relatives: Edgar Lee Masters

Madeline Masters Stone (August 18, 1872 – September 24, 1932) was an American sculptor. She was the sister of poet Edgar Lee Masters.

She was born Madeline Ellen Masters on August 18, 1872, the daughter of Hardin Wallace Masters, an attorney and law partner of Abraham Lincoln's former partner William Herndon, and Emma Jerusha Dexter Masters. She was born in a log house on the Masters' Shipley Hill farm near Petersburg, Illinois. She attended Knox College, but did not graduate. In Lewiston, Illinois, she met a wealthy Chicago doctor, Carl D. Stone, who left his fiancée and married Masters in February 1893. They had three children.

In 1903, Dr. Stone was arrested for violating postal laws by mailing advertisements for a possibly fraudulent contraceptive called Dr. Lefevre's French Female Pills. He was defended in court by lawyer Clarence Darrow. As a result of the scandal, the Stones were ostracized by Chicago society. Dr. Stone lost his medical license and died of typhoid fever in 1907.

Madeline Stone and her children moved to Europe. She met Danish diplomat Niels Grön, who declared her "the reincarnation of Joan of Arc", and they married in 1912. They had one child before divorcing in 1922. During the divorce case, Grön's lawyer read parts of Edgar Lee Masters' Spoon River Anthology in court in an attempt to demonstrate that the Masters family was "bad and immoral".

Stone relocated to Georgetown, where she worked as a sculptor. She had studied sculpture with Gutzon Borglum and Lorado Taft. Her work included a bust of young Abraham Lincoln, later presented to Lincoln's New Salem, and a bust of Red Cross president John Barton Payne for the American Red Cross National Headquarters,

Madeline Masters Stone died on 24 September 1932 at the Park East Hospital in New York City.

== Children ==
Stone's children were:

- Elizabeth Masters Stone (24 February 1894-December 1966). She married Alan Lachlan Silverwood Cope in 1915 and the Comte Louis Bernard de la Barre de Danne in 1928. The Count and Countess started a charity called Les Braves Gens to aid poor elderly people in France after World War II.
- Emma Louise Masters Stone ( 3 February 1897- 7 May 1982), an interior decorator. She married William Sergeant "Bud" Bouvier, uncle of Jacqueline Kennedy Onassis, in 1917 and Carlisle Visscher Allan in 1932.
- Horatio Odell Stone III (26 January 1899 – 12 June 1977), who served in the British Army in India.
- Niels Grön, Jr., later renamed Edgar Lee Stone and then Lee Grön (13 November 1913-?), a prominent concert pianist.
