= Armenian Earthquake (Sogoyan) =

Public sculpture in Washington, D.C.

- Artist: F. Sogoian/M.Sogoian
- Year: 1991
- Type: Bronze
- Dimensions: 360 cm × 150 cm × 360 cm (140 in × 61 in × 140 in)
- Location: Washington, D.C.; 38.895278°N 77.04°W

Armenian Earthquake is a bronze monumental sculpture by Frederich and Mikael Sogoian. It expresses gratitude following the assistance provided following after the 1988 Spitak earthquake.

The sculpture was dedicated on March 15, 1991. It is located on the north lawn of the American Red Cross National Headquarters, N.W. Washington D.C.

The inscription reads:

TO THE AMERICAN

PEOPLE
FROM A GRATEFUL
ARMENIAN PEOPLE
EARTHQUAKE ASSISTANCE

DECEMBER 7, 1988

== See also ==
- List of public art in Washington, D.C., Ward 2
