= Lighthorse =

Lighthorse or Light Horse most often refers to Light cavalry, but may also refer to:

- 2nd/14th Light Horse Regiment, Australian Army Regiment
- 3rd Squadron, 17th Cavalry Regiment (United States)
- Australian Light Horse, mounted infantry who fought in World War I
  - 1st Light Horse Brigade
  - 2nd Light Horse Brigade
  - 3rd Light Horse Brigade
  - 4th Light Horse Brigade
  - 5th Light Horse Brigade
- Calcutta Light Horse, Indian Army reserve unit during the British Raj
- Henry Lee III, nicknamed "Light Horse Harry"
- Horse&Rider, magazine formerly called Light Horse
- Light Horse Regiment, South African Army unit
- Lighthorse (American Indian police)
- The Lighthorseman, a pub in York, England
- The Lighthorsemen (film), a 1987 feature film about an Australian Light Horse unit
- Rutherford's Light Horse expedition of July 1776
- South Alberta Light Horse
