= River Horse =

River Horse may refer to:

- Hippopotamus (ἱπποπόταμος), literally River Horse in Greek
- River Horse (sculpture), a sculpture at George Washington University
- River Horse Brewery, a brewery in New Jersey
- River-Horse, a 1999 book by William Least Heat-Moon
