= Statue of Alexander Pushkin (Washington, D.C.) =

Statue in Washington, D.C., U.S.

Alexander Pushkin
- Artist: Alexander Bourganov
- Year: 2000
- Type: Bronze
- Location: Washington, D.C., United States; 38°53′59.0166″N 77°2′55.4″W
- Owner: George Washington University

Alexander Pushkin is a bronze statue by Alexander Bourganov. It is located at the corner of 22nd Street and H Street, N.W. Washington, D.C., on the campus of George Washington University. It was erected as part of a cultural exchange between the cities of Moscow and Washington; in 2009, a statue of the American poet Walt Whitman was erected in Moscow. Pushkin's statue is said to be the first monument commemorating a Russian literary figure in the United States.

James W. Symington, then the Chairman of the American-Russian Cultural Cooperation Foundation, first proposed that a statue of Alexander Pushkin be erected in Washington. Ground was broken on June 6, 1999, the 200th anniversary of Pushkin's birth. The statue was completed over the forthcoming year and dedicated on September 20, 2000, as a gift from the Government of Moscow to the city of Washington.

The figure of the author is posed in front of a tall column on which stands the winged horse Pegasus, which represents "poetry and creative inspiration".

== See also ==
- List of public art in Washington, D.C., Ward 2
