= Lunar Bird =

Sculpture by Joan Miró

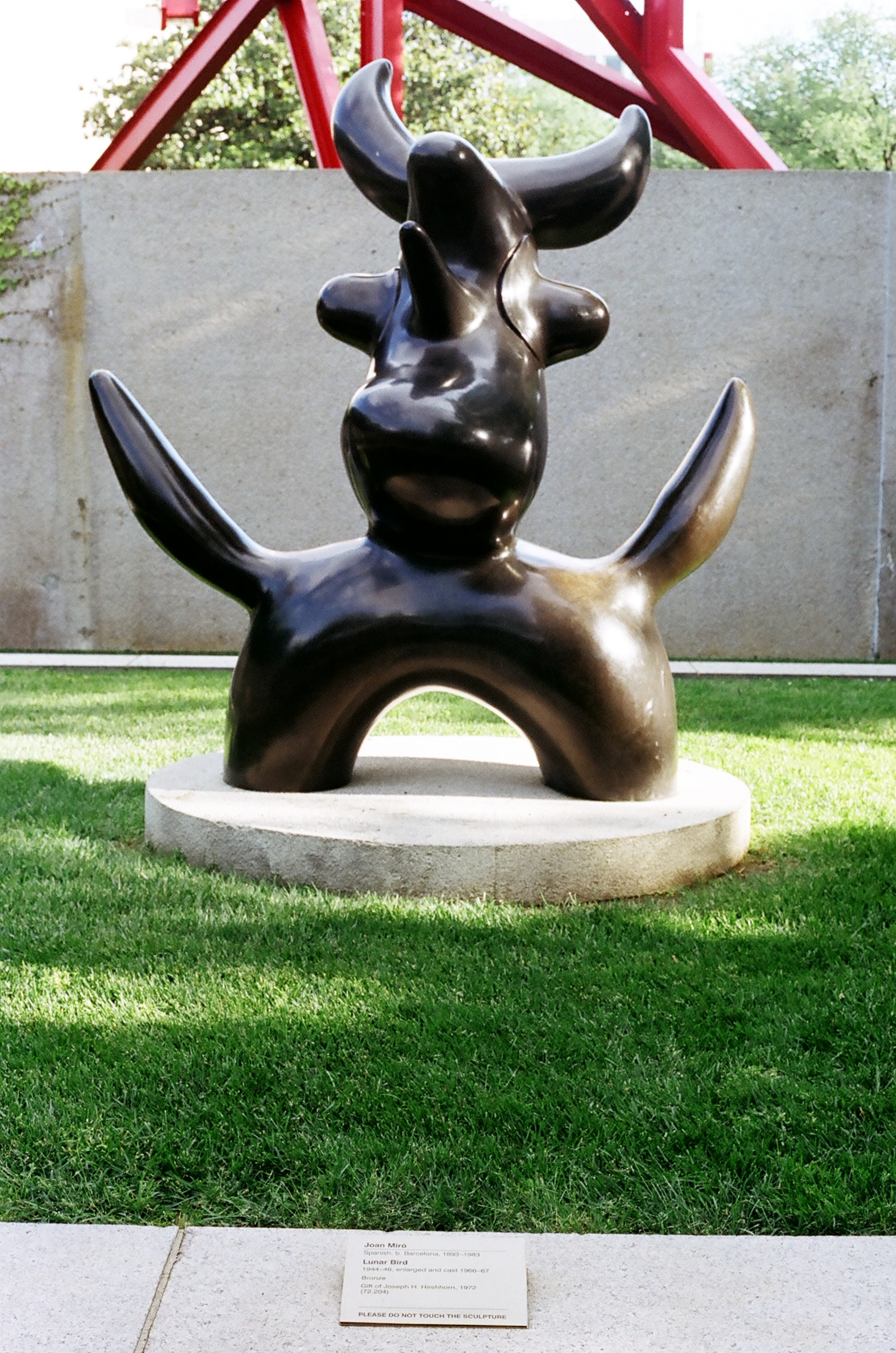
- Artist: Joan Miró
- Year: 1944-1946
- Type: Bronze
- Dimensions: 227.0 cm × 224.8 cm × 148.0 cm (89 3/8 in × 88 1/2 in × 58 1/4 in)
- Location: Hirshhorn Museum and Sculpture Garden; Washington, D.C.; 38.889017°N 77.022528°W
- Owner: Smithsonian Institution

Lunar Bird is an abstract bronze sculpture by Joan Miró. It was modeled in 1945, enlarged in 1966, and cast in 1967.

It is in the Hirshhorn Museum and Sculpture Garden, in Washington, D.C.

== See also ==
- List of public art in Washington, D.C., Ward 2
