= Kimpton Banneker Hotel =

Washington D.C. boutique hotel

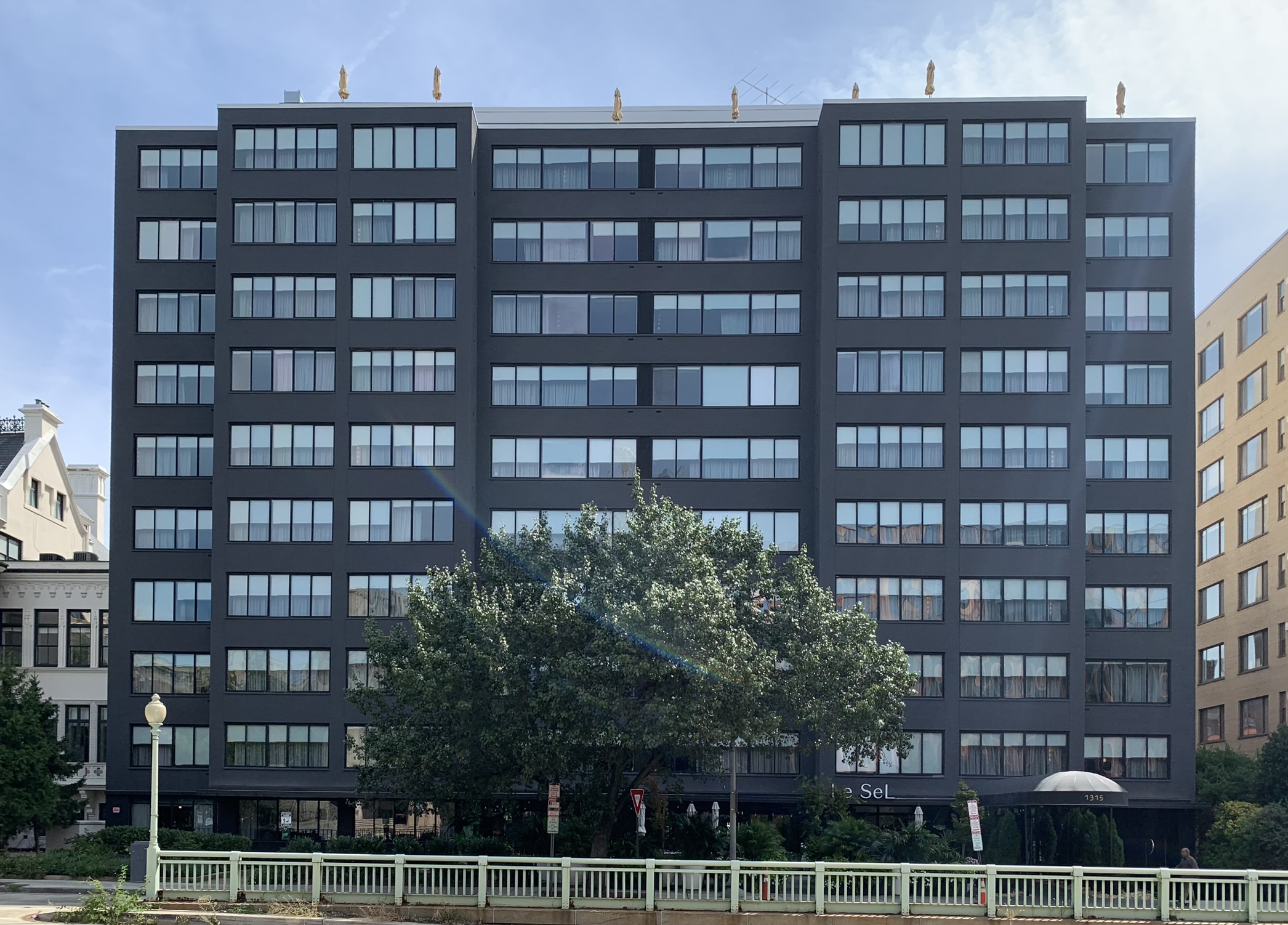
- Kimpton Banneker Hotel in 2023
- Interactive map of the Kimpton Banneker Hotel area
- Former names: Kimpton Rouge Hotel

General information
- Location: 1315 16th Street NW, Washington, D.C., United States
- Coordinates: 38.9082°N 77.0362°W
- Opened: December 14, 2001 (as Kimpton Rouge Hotel) June 16, 2021 (as Kimpton Banneker Hotel)
- Owner: Valor Hospitality Partners and Kemmons Wilson Hospitality Partners

Technical details
- Floor count: 10

Other information
- Number of rooms: 144

Kimpton Banneker Hotel is a 144-room boutique hotel located at 16th Street Northwest and Rhode Island Avenue in Washington, D.C. It is located at Scott Circle across from the Australian embassy. Originally a 1967 apartment building and then a Quality hotel, it opened as the Kimpton Rouge Hotel on December 14, 2001, and was owned by LaSalle Hotel Properties of Bethesda, Maryland. The building was purchased in 2001 and underwent a $14 million renovation along with the nearby Topaz Hotel. After selling to new owners in 2019, it underwent further renovations and reopened in June 2021 as the Kimpton Banneker Hotel.

== History ==
Kimpton hired Mike Moore, a product designer and interior decorator, to come up with the hotel's name and design. Moore chose "Rouge" and the crimson color scheme that was throughout the hotel after watching the film Moulin Rouge. Red walls, leopard print carpeting, white upholstery furniture, white shag carpets, and photographs of women were inspired by interior designers Jean-Michel Frank, Albert Hadley, and Philippe Starck.

The hotel was sold for $42 million to Kemmons Wilson Hospitality Partners and Valor Hospitality in 2019. Its subsequent 2020–2021 renovation, which cost an estimated $20 million, brought the number of rooms from 137 to 144. After delays related to the COVID-19 pandemic, the hotel reopened as the Kimpton Banneker on June 16, 2021.

The hotel's new name references Benjamin Banneker, an important early surveyor in Washington whose work included the area where the hotel is located.

== Features ==
The hotel features 144 rooms, a rooftop event space called Lady Bird (after Lady Bird Johnson), and a French bistro called Le Sel.

The previous incarnation housed a hotel lounge that served breakfast, dinner and late-night drinks called Bar Rouge.

== See also ==
- List of public art in Washington, D.C., Ward 2
