= Sky Hooks =

Coordinates: 38°53′20.2″N 77°1′22.9″W

- Interactive map of Sky Hooks
- Designer: Alexander Calder
- Type: Sculpture
- Material: Steel

Sky Hooks is a painted sheet steel sculpture by Alexander Calder, constructed in 1962. It is located at the Hirshhorn Museum and Sculpture Garden.

== See also ==
- List of Alexander Calder public works
- List of public art in Washington, D.C., Ward 2
