= Self-Portrait with Model at Bergamo =

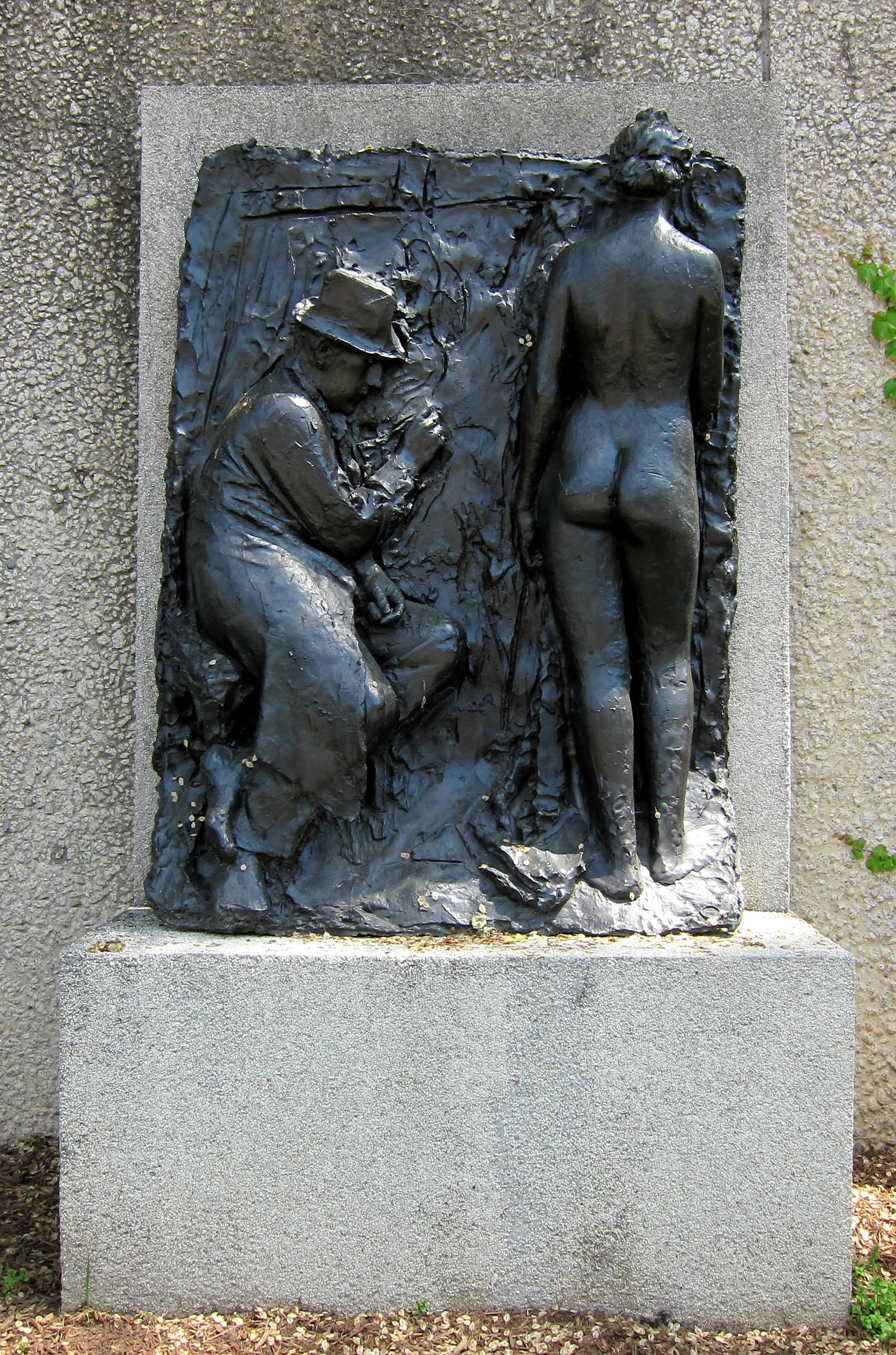
- Artist: Giacomo Manzù
- Year: 1942
- Type: Bronze
- Dimensions: 132.7 cm × 98.1 cm × 25.7 cm (52 1/4 in × 38 5/8 in × 10 1/8 in)
- Location: Washington, D.C., United States
- Owner: Smithsonian Institution

Self-Portrait with Model at Bergamo is a bronze sculpture by Giacomo Manzù, originally modeled in 1942. One cast, made by 1960, is located at the Hirshhorn Museum and Sculpture Garden of the Smithsonian Institution in Washington D.C..

== See also ==
- List of public art in Washington, D.C., Ward 2
- Young Girl on a Chair, another sculpture by Manzù at the Hirshhorn Museum and Sculpture Garden
