= Voltri XV =

Voltri XV

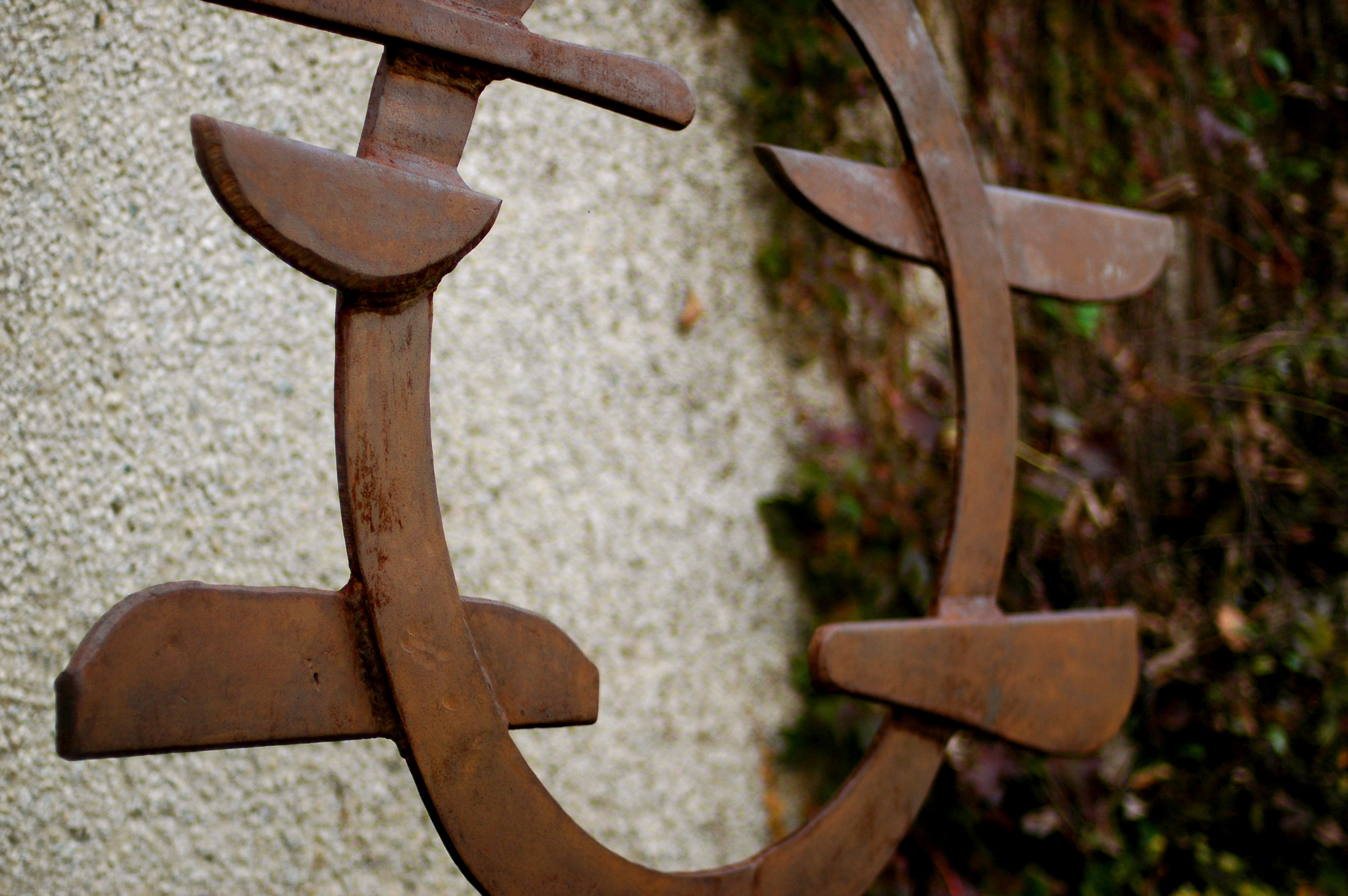

Voltri XV is an abstract sculpture by David Smith.

It is part of the Voltri series created in May through June 1962 in Italy. He worked at an abandoned steel factory, where he welded scrap steel. With assistants, he produced Twenty Six sculptures in thirty days.

It showed at Spoleto, Italy, the White House, and the Guggenheim Museum, and is at the Hirshhorn Museum and Sculpture Garden.

== See also ==
- List of public art in Washington, D.C., Ward 2
