= Monsoon Drift =

Sculpture by Anthony Caro

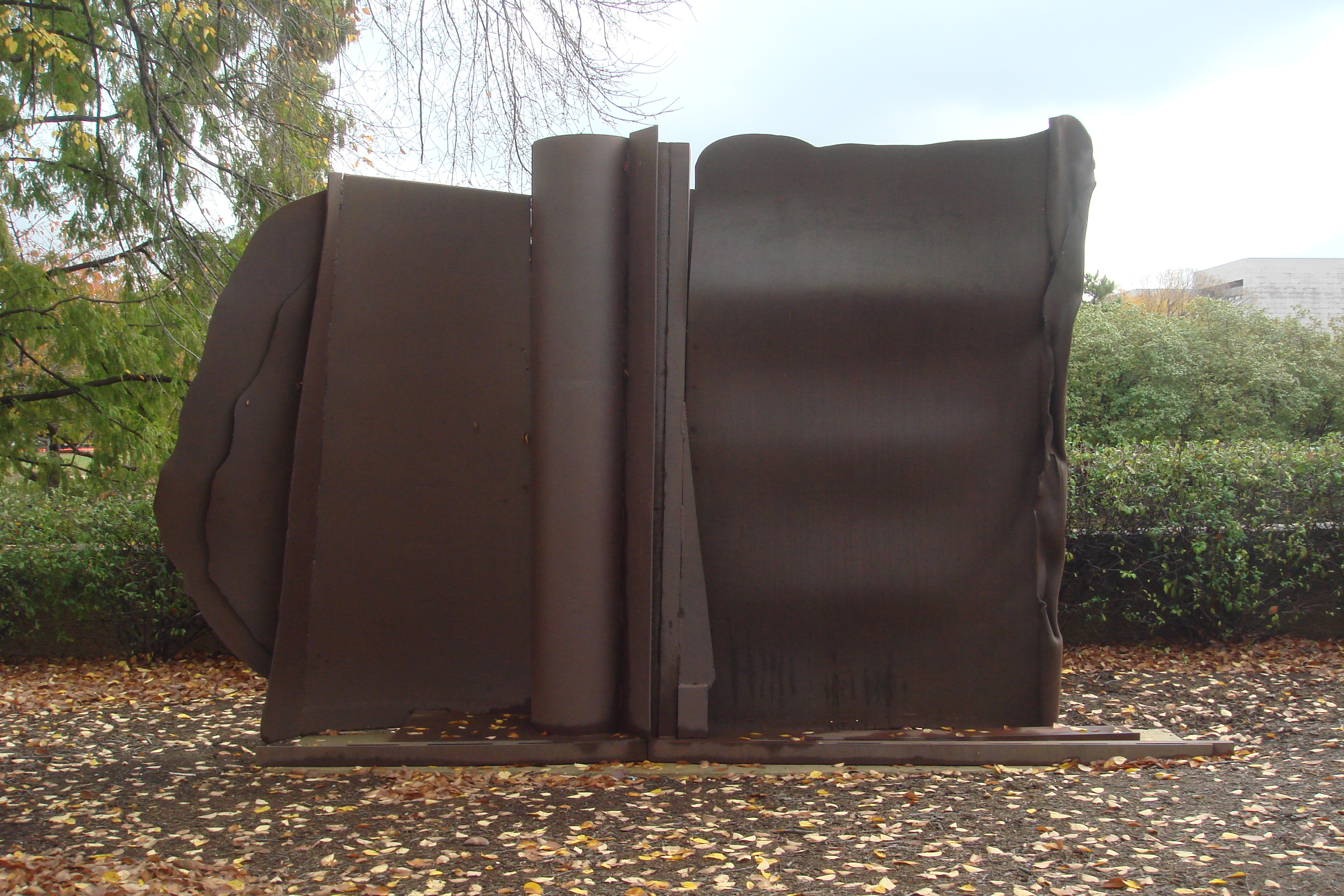
- Artist: Anthony Caro
- Year: 1975
- Type: Steel
- Dimensions: 530 cm × 100 cm (123 1/4 in × 207 in × 41 in)
- Location: Hirshhorn Museum and Sculpture Garden; Washington, D.C.; 38.889167°N 77.023056°W
- Owner: Hirshhorn Museum

Monsoon Drift is an abstract steel sculpture by English sculptor Anthony Caro, from 1975. It is located in the Hirshhorn Museum and Sculpture Garden, in Washington, D.C.

In 1973, he salvaged rolled steel material, at the Consett steel mills, County Durham, to later use in his sculptures.

== See also ==
- List of public art in Washington, D.C., Ward 2
