= Young Girl on a Chair =

Sculpture by Giacomo Manzù

- Artist: Giacomo Manzù
- Completion date: 1955
- Movement: Bronze sculpture
- Location: Hirshhorn Museum and Sculpture Garden, Washington, D.C., U.S.

Young Girl on a Chair is a 1955 bronze sculpture by Giacomo Manzù, installed at the Hirshhorn Museum and Sculpture Garden in Washington, D.C. The work measures 45 by 23 3/8 by 43 3/4 inches (1,140 mm × 590 mm × 1,110 mm) and depicts a nude young girl with her arms rested in her lap.

== See also ==
- List of public art in Washington, D.C., Ward 2
- Self-Portrait with Model at Bergamo, another sculpture by Manzù at the Hirshhorn Museum and Sculpture Garden
