= Daguerre Memorial =

Sculpture in Washington, D.C.

Coordinates: 38.89761°N 77.02214°W

- Daguerre Memorial in 2010
- Artist: Jonathan Scott Hartley
- Medium: Bronze and granite
- Movement: Sculpture
- Location: Washington, D.C.

The Daguerre Memorial is a bronze and granite sculpture by Jonathan Scott Hartley in Washington, D.C. It was erected in memory of Louis Daguerre.

== History ==
Erected at the instigation of the Photographers Association of America, a worldwide trade association of professional photographers, the Daguerre Memorial was dedicated on 15 August 1890 at the Arts and Industries Building. It was later moved outside, where it remained from 1897 to 1969, when it was removed and placed in storage to allow for the construction of the Hirshhorn Museum.

The 11-foot-tall (3.4 m) memorial was relocated and was rededicated in 1989, the 150th anniversary year of photography. It is outside the Old Patent Office Building, now home to the Smithsonian American Art Museum and the National Portrait Gallery, on 7th Street N.W., near F Street, in Washington.

The figure was cast by the Henry-Bonnard Bronze Company of New York.

The inscriptions read:

(Front of granite base, just below bust:)

DAGUERRE

(Side of granite base:)

PHOTOGRAPHY, THE ELECTRIC TELEGRAPH, AND THE STEAM ENGINE ARE THE THREE GREAT DISCOVERIES OF THE AGE. NO FIVE CENTURIES IN HUMAN PROGRESS CAN SHOW SUCH STRIDES AS THESE.

(Side of granite base:)

TO COMMEMORATE THE FIRST HALF-CENTURY IN PHOTOGRAPHY 1839–1889. ERECTED BY THE PHOTOGRAPHER'S ASSOCIATION OF AMERICA AUG. 1890.

== See also ==
- List of public art in Washington, D.C., Ward 2
