= Spatial Concept: Nature =

Bronze sculpture by Lucio Fontana

- Spatial Concept: Nature in 2022 at the Hirshhorn Museum and Sculpture Garden
- Artist: Lucio Fontana
- Year: 1959-1960
- Medium: Bronze sculpture
- Movement: Arte Povera
- Location: Hirshhorn Museum and Sculpture Garden & Minneapolis Sculpture Garden, Washington, DC & Minneapolis, Minnesota

Spatial Concept: Nature is a series of bronze sculptures by Lucio Fontana designed between 1959 and 1960. A series of these sculptures cast in 1965 is installed at the Hirshhorn Museum and Sculpture Garden in Washington, D.C., United States, and a set cast in 1961 is owned by the Walker Art Center and installed in the Minneapolis Sculpture Garden in Minneapolis, United States.

== See also ==
- List of public art in Washington, D.C., Ward 2
