= Bust of Alberto Santos-Dumont =

Sculpture in Washington, D.C., U.S.

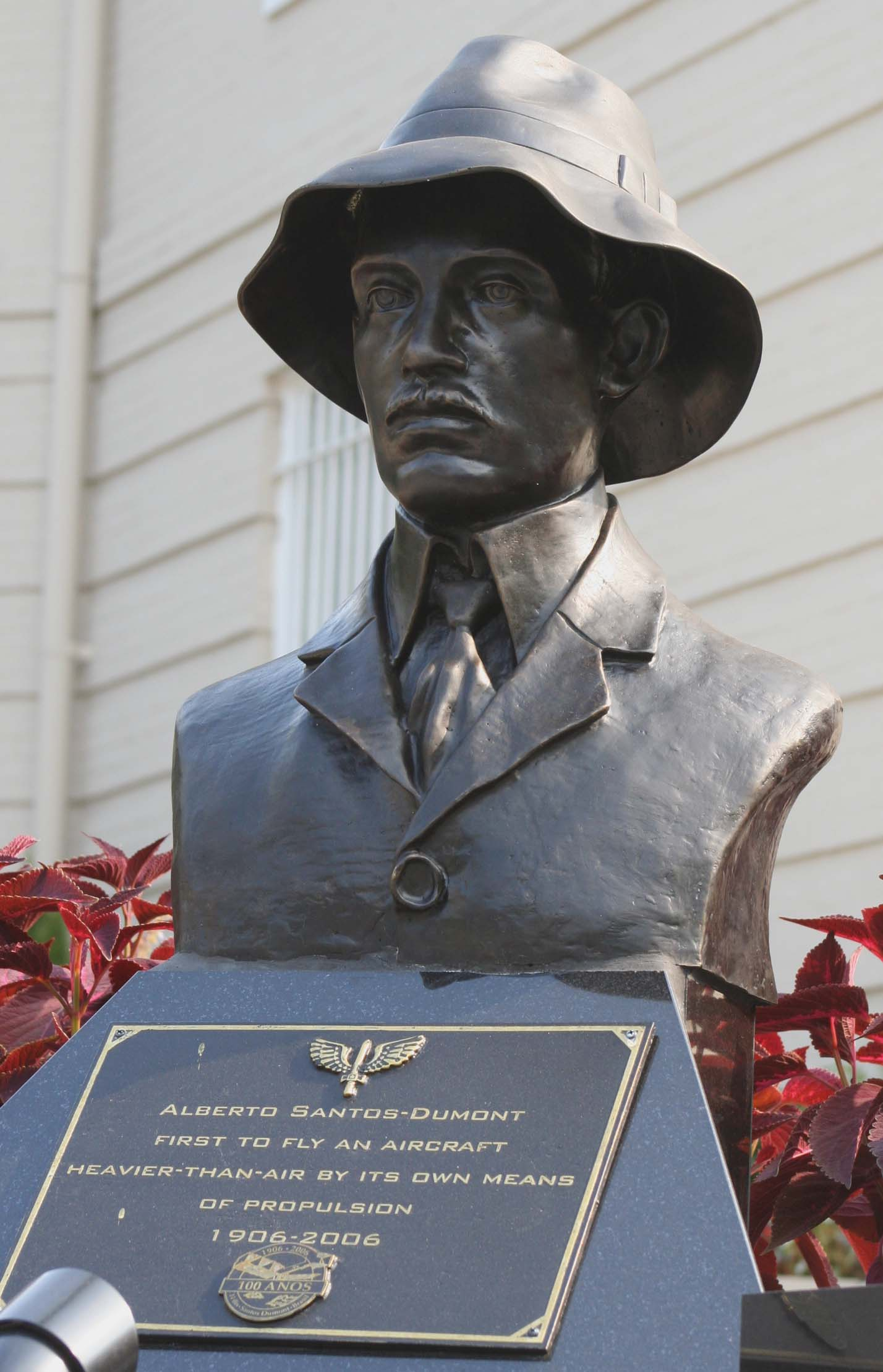
- Bust in 2006
- Type: Sculpture
- Medium: Bronze
- Subject: Alberto Santos-Dumont
- Location: Washington, D.C., United States; 38.912707°N 77.048685°W

An outdoor bust of Alberto Santos-Dumont is installed near the Embassy of Brazil, at the corner of 22nd and R Street NW, in the Kalorama Heights neighborhood of Washington, D.C., United States.

The bust is made out of bronze.

== See also ==
- List of public art in Washington, D.C., Ward 2
