= Geometric Mouse, Variation I, Scale A =

Sculpture by Claes Oldenburg

Geometric Mouse, Variation I, Scale A (1971) by Claes Oldenburg

Geometric Mouse, Variation I, Scale A is an abstract sculpture by Claes Oldenburg. created in 1971.

Examples are located at the Hirshhorn Museum and Sculpture Garden, Museum of Modern Art, and Walker Art Center.

== See also ==
- List of public art in Washington, D.C., Ward 2
