= Eros, Inside Eros =

Bronze sculpture by Arman

Eros, Inside Eros

Eros, Inside Eros (1986) is a bronze sculpture by Arman.

It is in the Hirshhorn Museum and Sculpture Garden.

The artist began cutting up works in 1962; the work comments on the emptiness of the god, Eros.

== See also ==
- List of public art in Washington, D.C., Ward 2
