= Subcommittee (Cragg) =

Sculpture by Tony Cragg

- Artist: Tony Cragg
- Year: 1991
- Type: Steel
- Location: Hirshhorn Museum and Sculpture Garden; Washington, D.C.
- Owner: Smithsonian Institution

Subcommittee is a sculpture by English artist Tony Cragg. Constructed of mild steel in 1991, in an edition of 4, it will rust with the passage of time.

The rack of stamps serves as a satiric commentary on committees. It is held in the Hirshhorn Museum and Sculpture Garden, in Washington, D.C..

== See also ==
- List of public art in Washington, D.C., Ward 2
