= Evocation of a Form: Human, Lunar, Spectral =

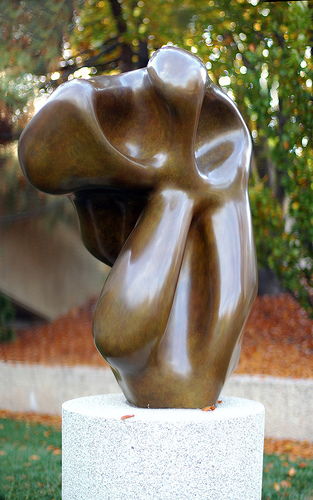
- Sculpture in 2006
- Artist: Jean Arp
- Year: 1950
- Type: Bronze
- Dimensions: 115.6 cm × 82.2 cm × 85.1 cm (45 1/2 in × 32 3/8 in × 33 1/2 in)
- Location: Washington, D.C., United States; 38.889092°N 77.022958°W
- Owner: Smithsonian Institution

Evocation of a Form: Human, Lunar, Spectral is an abstract bronze sculpture by Jean Arp. Modeled in 1950; it was cast in 1957.

It is in the Hirshhorn Museum and Sculpture Garden.

== See also ==
- List of public art in Washington, D.C., Ward 2
