= Untitled (Ellsworth Kelly) =

1986 stainless steel sculpture

- Artist: Ellsworth Kelly
- Year: 1986
- Dimensions: 200 cm × 78 cm (79 in × 31 in)
- Location: Washington, D.C., United States

Untitled is a 1986 stainless steel sculpture by Ellsworth Kelly, installed at the Hirshhorn Museum and Sculpture Garden, in Washington, D.C., United States. The sculpture measures 78 inches (200 cm) x 135.25 inches (343.5 cm) x 129.75 inches (329.6 cm).

== See also ==
- 1986 in art
- List of public art in Washington, D.C., Ward 2
