= The Drummer (Flanagan) =

Public sculpture in Washington, D.C.

- Artist: Barry Flanagan
- Year: 1996
- Type: Bronze
- Dimensions: 240 cm × 170 cm × 91 cm (96 in × 68 in × 36 in)
- Location: Washington, D.C.; 38.8889°N 77.02265°W
- Owner: Smithsonian Institution

The Drummer is a bronze sculpture, by Barry Flanagan, from 1996.

It is at the Hirshhorn Museum and Sculpture Garden, in Washington, D.C.. It was made in 1996, and donated by the artist in 2001.

== See also ==
- List of public art in Washington, D.C., Ward 2
