= Pittsburgh Landscape =

Sculpture by David Smith

Pittsburgh Landscape

Pittsburgh Landscape is a 1954 painted steel abstract sculpture, by David Smith. It is in the Hirshhorn Museum and Sculpture Garden.

== See also ==
- List of public art in Washington, D.C., Ward 2
