= River Horse (sculpture) =

Sculpture in the United States

The River Horse
- Type: Bronze
- Location: Washington, D.C., United States; 38.899491°N 77.04678°W
- Owner: George Washington University

The River Horse is a bronze sculpture of a hippopotamus located on the campus of George Washington University. It is in front of Lisner Auditorium, at 21st Street and H Street, Northwest, Washington, D.C., in the Foggy Bottom neighborhood.

In 1996, George Washington University President Stephen Joel Trachtenberg presented this bronze statue as a gift to the University's Class of 2000. The hippo stands with its mouth wide. Its nose is slightly worn due to passersby rubbing it. A plaque is placed on the base:

Legend has it that the Potomac was once home to these wondrous beasts.
George & Martha Washington are even said to have watched them cavort in
the river shallows from the porch of their beloved Mount Vernon on summer evenings.
Credited with enhancing the fertility of the plantation, the Washingtons believed
the hippopotamus brought them good luck & children on the estate often attempted
to lure the creatures close enough to the shore to touch a nose for good luck.

So, too, may generations of students of the George Washington University.
Art for wisdom,
Science for joy,
Politics for beauty,
And a Hippo for hope.

The George Washington University Class of 2000
August 28, 1996

The hippopotamus is not native to North America. President Trachtenberg admitted he invented the story. He said that, for fun, he made up a story that George Washington watched hippos swim in the Potomac River.

According to Mary V. Thompson, research Historian at the Mount Vernon Estate and Gardens, George Washington did explore the possibility of purchasing a piece of agricultural equipment known as a Hippopotamus, which he hoped would efficiently remove nutrient-rich soil from the Potomac to be used as fertilizer for his fields.

== See also ==
- List of public art in Washington, D.C., Ward 2

== Sources ==
- "Order of the Hippo’s not-so-secret secrets unveiled", GW Hatchet, Cindy J. Roth, 2/8/01
- J. Goode, Washington Sculpture, The Johns Hopkins University Press, 2008. ISBN 0-8018-8810-7, A cultural history of outdoor sculpture in the Nation's capital, discussing the River Horse.
- http://wikimapia.org/6286328/Hippopotamus-Statue
