= Horse and Rider (Marini) =

Sculpture by Marino Marini

Coordinates: 38°53′20.97″N 77°1′22.62″W

- Artist: Marino Marini
- Year: 1952–1953
- Type: Bronze.
- Location: Hirshhorn Museum, Washington, D.C.
- Owner: Hirshhorn Museum

Horse and Rider is a modern equestrian bronze sculpture by Marino Marini. Executed in 1952–1953, it is located at the Hirshhorn Museum and Sculpture Garden.

After the Second World War, Marini developed a horse and rider theme, where the figure is not in control of his mount.

== See also ==
- List of public art in Washington, D.C., Ward 2
