= Zachary Oxman =

American sculptor (born 1968)

- Born: 1968 (age 57–58); Reston, Virginia
- Education: BFA in Sculpture from Carnegie Mellon University; Independent Study at Studio Arts Center International, Florence, Italy
- Known for: Sculptures, Installations
- Website: zacharyoxman.com

Zachary Oxman (born 1968) is a contemporary sculptor and artist who creates sculptures, architectural pieces, and installations using varying types of media. Oxman uses the lost-wax casting technique for the majority of his work with several types of metal, including brass and stainless-steel. He was born in Reston, Virginia, in 1968 and currently lives and works in Maryland.

== Early life and education ==
Oxman was born in Reston, Virginia in 1968. His father, an architect, and his mother, an accomplished artist in several mediums, were some of his biggest influences in starting his career as an artist. His mother, Laney Oxman, says he exhibited talented from a very early age. His second biggest influence was when he studied sculptures of the Baroque period while traveling in Florence, Italy.

In addition to his independent studies in Italy in 1988, Oxman studied at the Corcoran School of Art in Washington, DC, and went on to receive his Bachelor of Fine Arts in sculpture from Carnegie Mellon University in 1990.

== Notable works ==
In 2013, Oxman was contacted by the Obama Administration to create the official White House gifts to Israeli Prime Minister Benjamin Netanyahu. The gifts included Sabbath candlesticks for Netanyahu's daughter and a Kiddush (ceremonial wine) goblet for his son. His work first became noticed by the Clinton Administration, who asked Oxman to create menorahs that were displayed in the White House. Oxman was contacted again in 2015 to create another official White House gift that Barack Obama presented to Pope Francis. The sculpture consists of a stainless-steel dove, perched atop an iron bar that was part of the Statue of Liberty's original armature.

Among the many museums where his work has been exhibited are the Smithsonian American Art Museum (Washington, DC), the American Craft Museum (New York, NY), The Jewish Museum San Francisco (San Francisco, CA), the Museum of Fine Arts (Springfield, MA), and the Los Angeles County Museum of Art.
