= Michael Enn Sirvet =

American sculptor

- Born: May 9, 1967 (age 59); Englewood, New Jersey
- Education: Fordham University; University of Maryland, College Park
- Known for: Sculpture
- Awards: Award of Distinction for Metal, James Renwick Alliance, 2009

Michael Enn Sirvet (born 1967) is an American sculptor, designer, and structural engineer. He acquired skills and exposure to traditional sculpture techniques while studying undergraduate art history as a minor at Fordham University in the Bronx, New York, and while studying for his Bachelor of Science in Civil Engineering, at the University of Maryland, College Park, by pursuing a minor in Studio Arts.

== Early career ==
Sirvet is largely self-taught. In his early career as an artist, while maintaining full-time employment as a structural engineer as a member of Land Sculpture Studio in Beltsville, Maryland, he worked principally at making abstract, contemporary minimalist constructions using recycled metals and wood. His first shows at Washington D.C.'s Artomatic introduced him to the larger contemporary arts community in the metropolitan area. His bowl "Millennia" was awarded Award of Distinction for Metal by the James Renwick Alliance, a program of the Renwick Gallery, Smithsonian American Art Museum.

== Mid-career ==
Sirvet's mid-career started flourishing when he left full-time work in 2008 to concentrate on fine art sculpture and functional design.

Having experimented with new forms in the early 2000s, Sirvet still works by hand, but has also pioneered use of new industrial technology for his art, using skills learned in the engineering field to create solid forms out of structural aluminum, architectural plastics, and wood, which are sometimes combined in modular components.

Sirvet has garnered several public art installations, including two commissions for the United States' Art in Embassies Program for the United States Embassy in Valletta, Malta and the United States Consulate in Dubai, United Arab Emirates. In the United States, public art installations include Farragut Spheres for District of Columbia's Washington Metropolitan Area Transit Authority MetroArts Art in Transit program, and Red Orchard Wall for the Montgomery County Public Arts Trust.
