= Wendy Ross =

American pediatrician

Wendy Ross MD, FAAP
- Education: Brandeis University; Icahn School of Medicine at Mount Sinai
- Occupations: Developmental pediatrician, clinical professor
- Known for: Director of Jefferson Health’s Center for Autism and Neurodiversity (JeffCAN)
- Awards: CNN Hero (2014), Philadelphia City Council Honor (2018), Alpha Omega Alpha, Morris Y. Krosnick Award, Main Line Parent LOVE Award (2019)

Wendy Ross is an American developmental pediatrician and clinical professor. She is the director of Jefferson Health’s Center for Autism and Neurodiversity (JeffCAN) in Philadelphia, Pennsylvania. Ross’s clinical work focuses on supporting children with developmental differences by integrating medical, educational, and therapeutic plans. Through JeffCAN, she develops programs for neurodivergent individuals, including those with intellectual and developmental disabilities, across the lifespan. Her work addresses healthcare accessibility and community inclusion for neurodiverse populations.

Ross has collaborated with Philadelphia sports teams to create inclusive game-day experiences for neurodivergent fans. She also helped establish programs to make air travel more accessible for individuals with autism and related conditions, which informed policies at the U.S. Department of Transportation and Department of Homeland Security. In 2014, Ross was recognized as a Top 10 CNN Hero for her efforts to improve inclusion in sports and travel. During the COVID-19 pandemic, she contributed to research on individuals with intellectual and developmental disabilities, which influenced guidance from the Centers for Disease Control and Prevention (CDC).

== Education ==
Ross completed her undergraduate studies at Brandeis University. She attended the Humanities and Medicine Program at Mount Sinai School of Medicine in New York, graduating in 1997. Ross completed her residency in pediatrics at Yale University in 2000. She then completed a fellowship in behavioral pediatrics at Boston Children's Hospital in 2002.

== Career ==
Ross worked as a developmental pediatrician at Boston Children's Hospital and served as an instructor at Harvard Medical School until 2006. She then moved to Philadelphia, where she became Director of Developmental Medicine and Genetics at Albert Einstein Medical Center until July 2011. In 2011, Ross founded Autism Inclusion Resources (AIR), an organization focused on improving accessibility and inclusion for individuals with autism. She established her private practice, the Center for Pediatric Development, in 2012.

== Awards and recognition ==
In 2014, Ross was named a CNN Hero for her work supporting children with autism and their families. In 2018, the Philadelphia City Council honored Ross during Autism Awareness Month. Ross graduated from the Mount Sinai School of Medicine as a member of the Alpha Omega Alpha medical honor society. During her residency at Yale, she received the Morris Y. Krosnick Award for Dedication, Compassion, and Caring. In 2019, Ross received a Local Parent of the Year LOVE Award from Main Line Parent magazine.

== Personal life ==
Ross married Michael Ross on June 8, 1997. Ross is Jewish and serves on the inclusion committee at her synagogue, Beth Am Israel, in Penn Valley, Pennsylvania. She is the mother of two sons.
