= Jonathan Scott Hartley =

American sculptor (1845–1912)

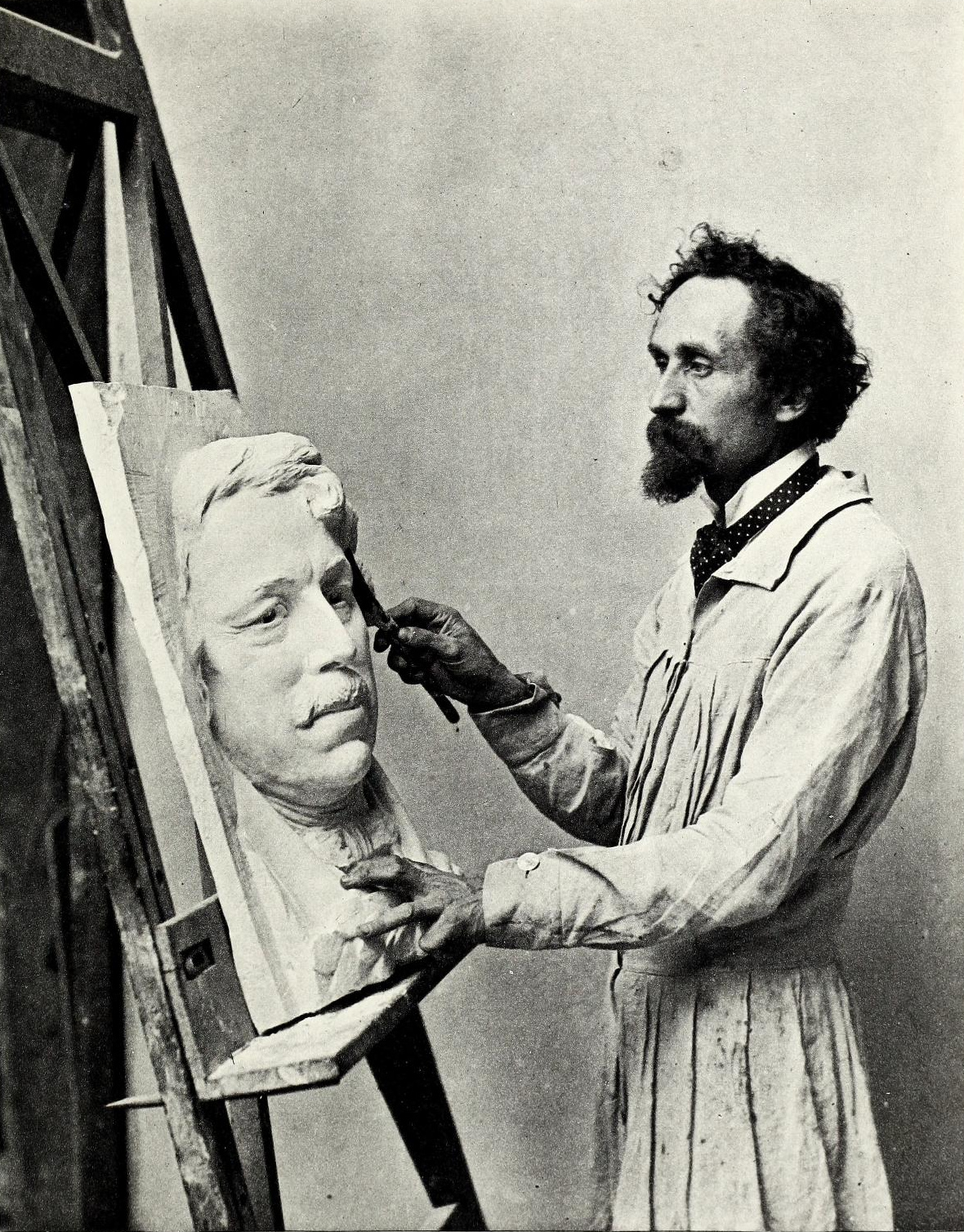
- Born: September 23, 1845; Albany, New York
- Died: December 6, 1912 (aged 67); New York, New York
- Education: The Albany Academy
- Occupation: Sculptor
- Spouse: Helen Inness (m. 1888)

Jonathan Scott Hartley (September 23, 1845 – December 6, 1912) was an American sculptor.

== Biography ==
Jonathan Scott Hartley was born in Albany, New York on September 23, 1845. He was educated at The Albany Academy, and married Helen Inness in 1888.

He was a pupil of Erastus Dow Palmer, New York, and of the schools of the Royal Academy, London; he later studied for a year in Berlin and for a year in Paris. His first important work (1882) was a statue of Miles Morgan, the Puritan, for Springfield, Massachusetts. Among his other works are the Daguerre Memorial in Washington; Thomas K. Beecher, Elmira, New York, and Alfred the Great, Appellate Division Courthouse of New York State. He devoted himself particularly to the making of portrait busts, in which he attained high rank. In 1881 he became a member of the National Academy of Design. Hartley was a founding member of the Salmagundi Club New York and served as its president from 1903 to 1905.

He sculpted three of the nine busts around the front of the Thomas Jefferson Building of the Library of Congress in Washington, DC. His Nathaniel Hawthorne, often mistaken for Mark Twain, has pride of place in the ornate west front gallery of the original Library of Congress building, finished in 1897. He also sculpted the Washington Irving and the Ralph Waldo Emerson and the Noah Davis. The Emerson bust is an exact likeness, as Hartley, and especially his supervisor, Ainsworth Rand Spofford, knew how prominent Emerson's nose actually was.

Hartley died at his home in New York City on December 6, 1912.

== Gallery ==
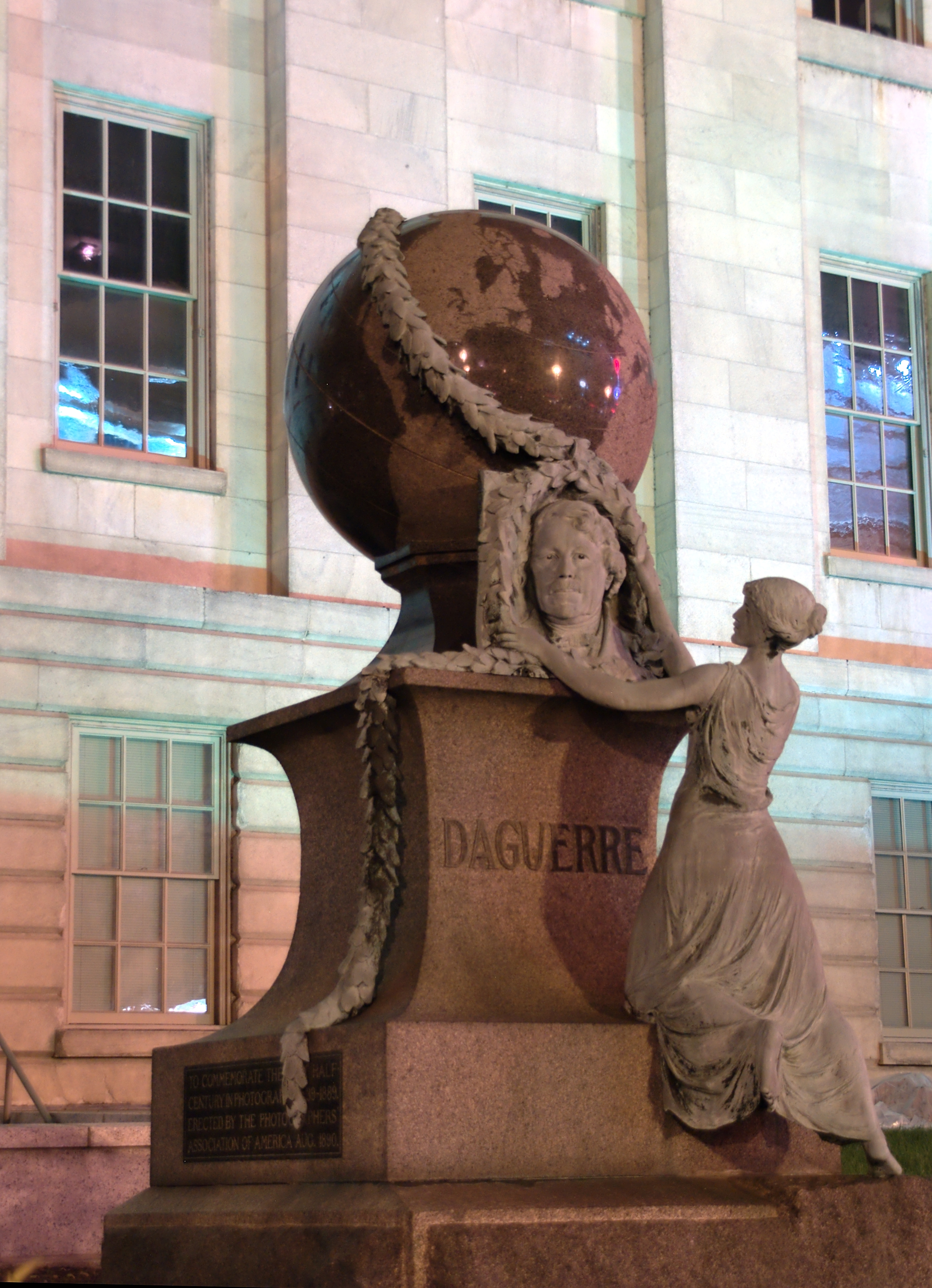

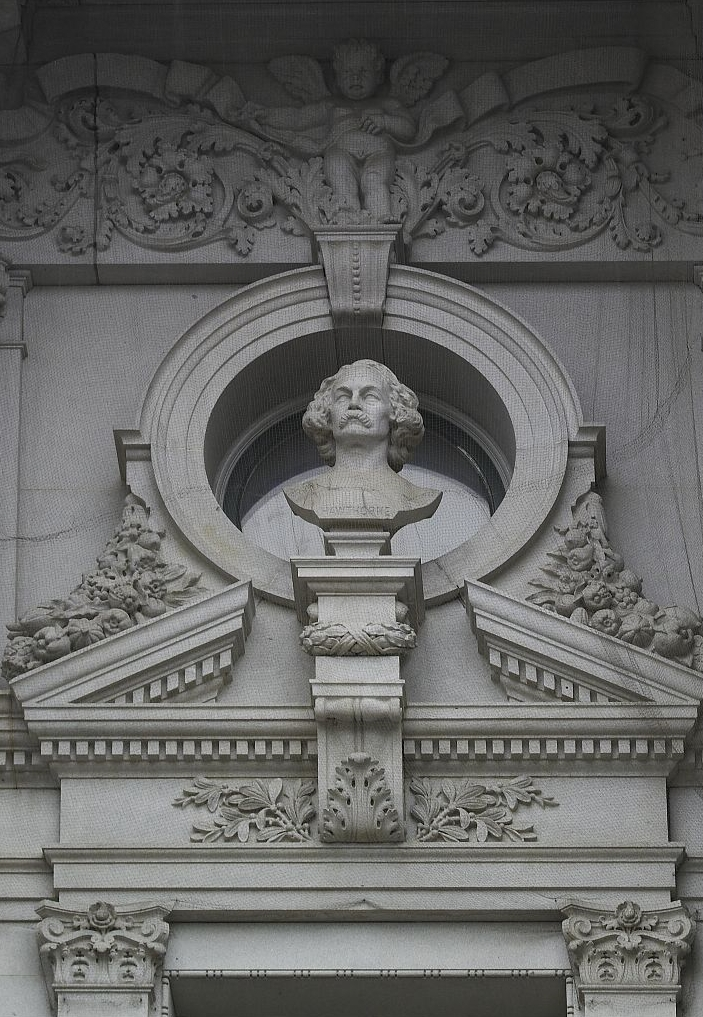

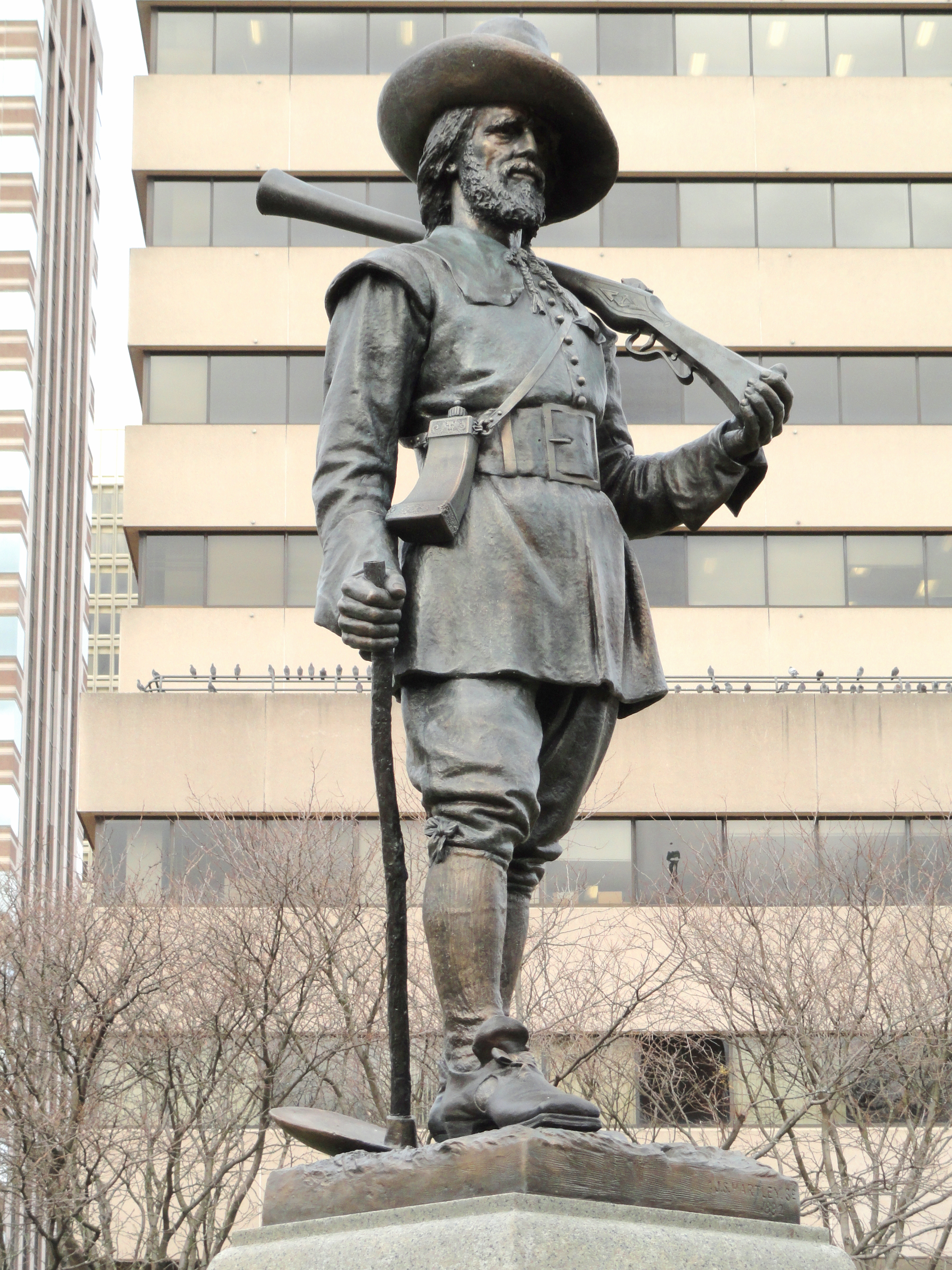

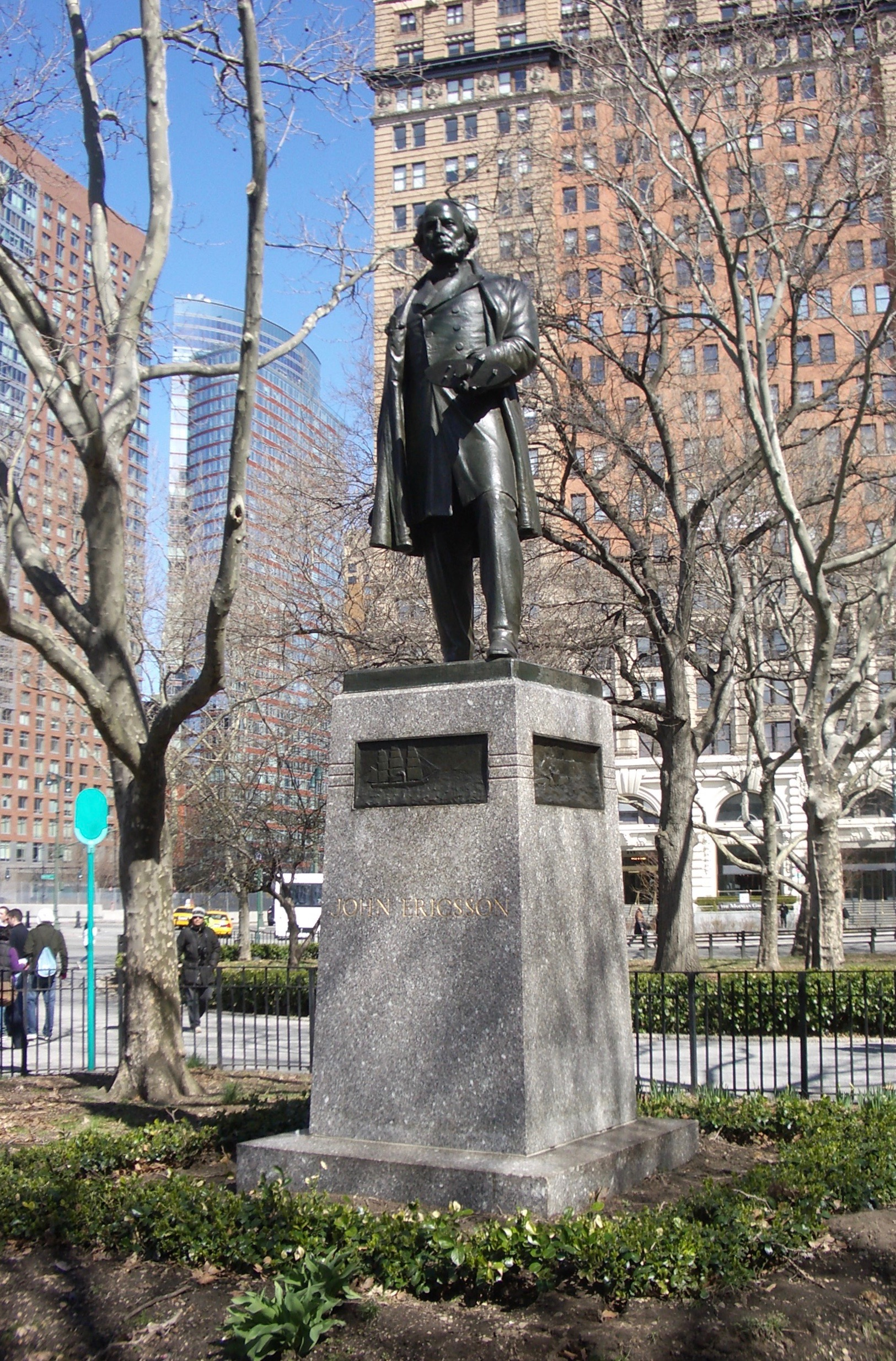
