= Horse&Rider =

British equestrian magazine

- Frequency: 13 times per year
- Founder: David J. Murphy
- Founded: 1950
- Company: DJ Murphy
- Country: United Kingdom
- Language: English
- Website: horseandrideruk.com
- ISSN: 0955-5366

Horse&Rider (also Horse&Rider Magazine) is a newstrade and subscription magazine published in the United Kingdom by DJ Murphy.

It is issued 13 times per year and features "riding and practical advice for your horse." It is claimed to be one of the UK's leading equestrian magazines for riders and horse owners.

== History ==
The magazine was founded by David J. Murphy in 1950, under the title Showjumping then Light Horse. After decades as Light Horse, in 1981 the title was changed to Horse&Rider.
