= American Red Cross National Headquarters =

Building in Washington, D.C.

- American National Red Cross
- U.S. National Register of Historic Places
- U.S. National Historic Landmark
- D.C. Inventory of Historic Sites
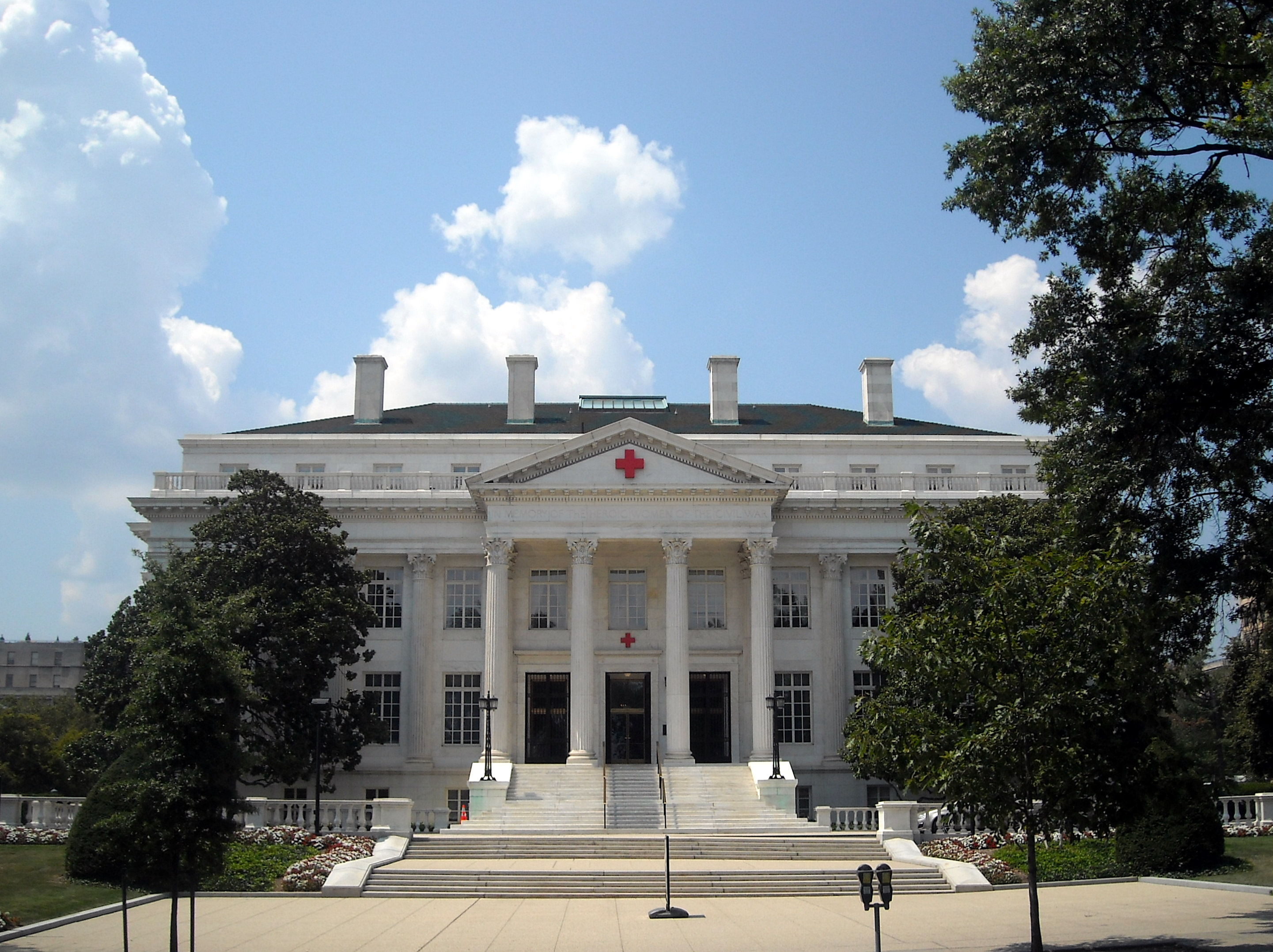
- American Red Cross National Headquarters in Washington, D.C.

- Location within Central Washington, D.C. Location within the District of Columbia Location within the United States
- Location: 17th and D Sts., NW, Washington, D.C.
- Coordinates: 38°53′41.6″N 77°2′24.6″W
- Built: 1915 to 1917
- Architect: Trowbridge & Livingston
- Architectural style: Classical Revival
- NRHP reference No.: 66000853
- DCIHS No.: 15

Significant dates
- Added to NRHP: October 15, 1966
- Designated NHL: June 23, 1965
- Designated DCIHS: November 8, 1964

The American Red Cross National Headquarters is located at 430 17th Street NW in Washington, D.C. Built between 1915 and 1917, it serves both as a memorial to women who served in the American Civil War and as the headquarters building for the American Red Cross. It was declared a National Historic Landmark in 1965.

== Architecture ==
The national headquarters of the American Red Cross is located in central Washington, D.C., on the east side of a city block bounded by 17th, D, and E Streets NW. This block, on the west side of The Ellipse south of the White House, is entirely devoted to Red Cross facilities. The main headquarters building is a large stone structure, faced in white Vermont marble and roofed with Ludowici tile. It is three stories in height, its third floor recessed behind a balustrade. Its east-facing main facade has a central classical temple portico, with six Corinthian columns supporting a gabled pediment with a red cross at the center. The flanking building bays are articulated by attached Corinthian columns. The main bronze doorways lead into a large central marble entrance hall, with a broad stairway to the second floor. Niches in the hall are filled with sculptural depictions of "Faith", "Hope", and "Charity", executed by Hiram Powers.

=== Tiffany windows ===
The Board of Governors room contains three Favrile windows by designer Louis Comfort Tiffany. The windows are notable for being the largest suite of Tiffany windows outside a religious building. Unlike many other Tiffany windows, these windows have remained in their original setting. The costs of these windows were donated by two organizations of American Civil War women: the Woman's Relief Corps of the North and the United Daughters of the Confederacy. The left panel was based on Henry Wadsworth Longfellow's poem, "Santa Filomena" that honored the work of Florence Nightingale. The center panel depicts the conception of the International Red Cross and Red Crescent Movement at the Battle of Solferino near Solferino, Italy. The right panel depicts a scene from Edmund Spenser's poem "The Faerie Queene".

== History ==
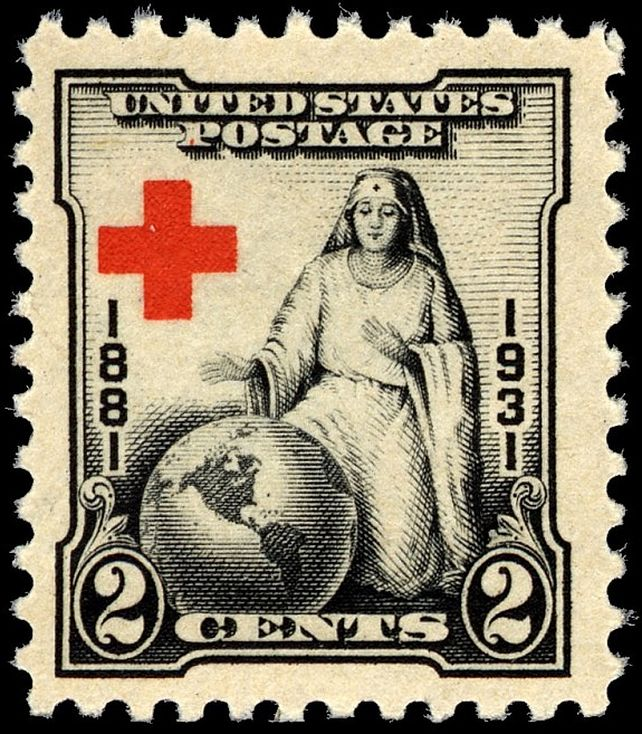
American Red Cross 50th anniversary commemorative issue of 1931

The American Red Cross was founded in 1881 in the aftermath of the American Civil War as a unique public-private partnership for providing disaster relief and medical support for military forces. This headquarters building was built between 1915 and 1917 to a design by Trowbridge & Livingston. It cost approximately $800,000 and was dedicated on May 12, 1917.

== See also ==
- List of National Historic Landmarks in Washington, D.C.
- National Register of Historic Places listings in central Washington, D.C.
