= Bernd Grimm =

German architectural model builder

- Born: 1962; Ellwangen, Baden-Württemberg, Germany
- Known for: architectural models

Bernd Grimm (born 1962) is a German product designer, architectural model builder and artist. He became known through the creation of architectural models of historical and antique buildings. Ten of his models belong to the collection of the architectural icons of the architect Oswald Mathias Ungers.

== Biography ==
Grimm was born in Ellwangen an der Jagst, Germany. He studied Industrial Design from 1983 to 1989 at the Hochschule für bildende Künste Hamburg with Lambert Rosenbusch and graduated as a designer. During his studies he developed an interest in the field of architectural theory. Together with his fellow student Jan Kraege, he carried out scientific research on historical buildings such as the Temple of Clitumnus near Spoleto (1985) and produced a model of it. He also investigated the functionality of the proportional compass developed by Balthasar Neumann. During his studies, the German Archaeological Institute commissioned him to create a model of the Temple of Mars Ultor at the Forum of Augustus in Rome (1987). After completing his studies, Grimm worked from 1990 to 2007 as a free-lance designer in the architectural office of Oswald Mathias Ungers, where he was responsible for the creation of architectural models of historically significant buildings. The idea was to create a kind of "three-dimensional collection". Over the years, ten architectural icons of the Ungers Collection were created, which Grimm produced after intensive research from Alabaster gypsum. The model thus becomes a high-quality cultural item.

From 2007 until Grimm was the artistic director of Oswald Mathias Ungers Archive for Architectural Research. From 2012 to 2014 he was an academic staff member at the Atelier Gerhard Richter in Cologne. In 2015 he received a practical scholarship of the Villa Massimo in Rome.

== Architectural models ==
My models depict abstraction: they do not show buildings, but pure ideas.
(in German: Meine Modelle abstrahieren: sie zeigen keine Bauten, sondern die reine Idee.)

— Bernd Grimm,

Architectural models can perform various functions. The architect can use a sketch model to check the realisability of his ideas. Presentation models can be submitted to competitions, more extensive models can show how a planned building integrates into the existing environment. In the field of architectural theory, models are also used as teaching and learning models to illustrate the aesthetics and construction of historical buildings. Against this background, Grimm's works can be understood as models after built architectures or memory models.

Every model building project by Grimm starts with scientific research; old sketches and measured drawings are consulted and literature on the respective buildings are analyzed. Usually this is followed by local investigations, e.g. Grimm spent several months in Rome for the model of the Temple of Mars Ultor and photographed and measured the temple. Only after this extensive preparatory work can he make decisions about how the respective model should be designed: "First of all, I'm developing a mindset. What are the basics? What best describes the core and essence of a building? Two things are always decisive: reduction and interpretation."

For the representation of the Tempietto del Bramante it had to be considered that originally a circular courtyard surrounded by columns was planned, whereas the courtyard today is square and without surrounding columns. Steps also originally led to the temple, so that the observer could see the building from below. Grimm designed the pedestal historically correct as a circular surface and made it so high that the underside of the building, mediated by the steps of the temple, became visible. In the reconstruction of ancient temples such as the Pantheon or Parthenon, fundamental decisions had to be made as to which phase of the respective building should be represented – the ideal state or an image of what the temples look like today. Finally, a scale had to be chosen that illustrates the essential elements of the architecture without getting lost in details.

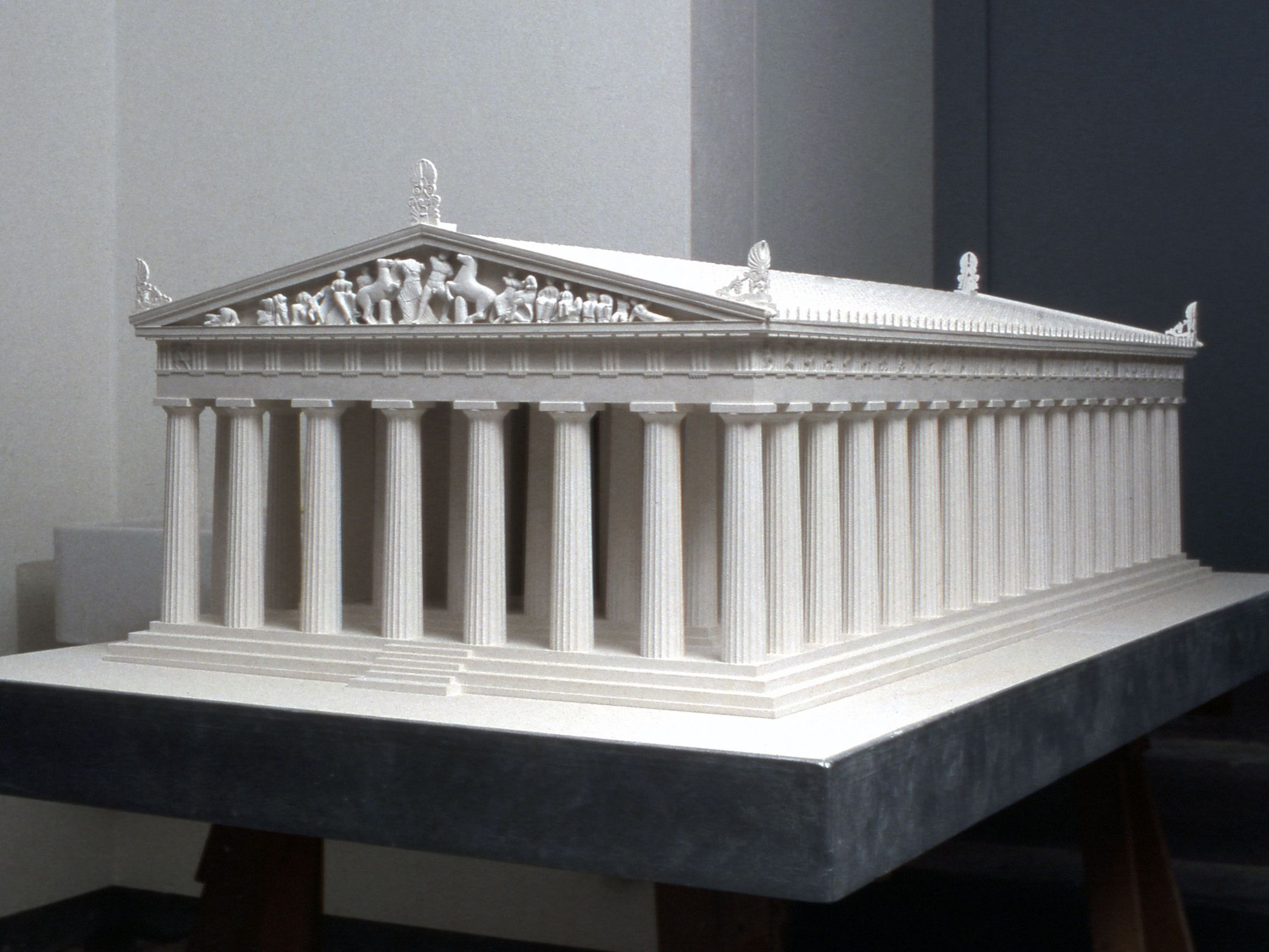
Model of the Parthenon,
Model in scale 1:50,
Architectural icon model collection by Oswald Mathias Ungers, Cologne

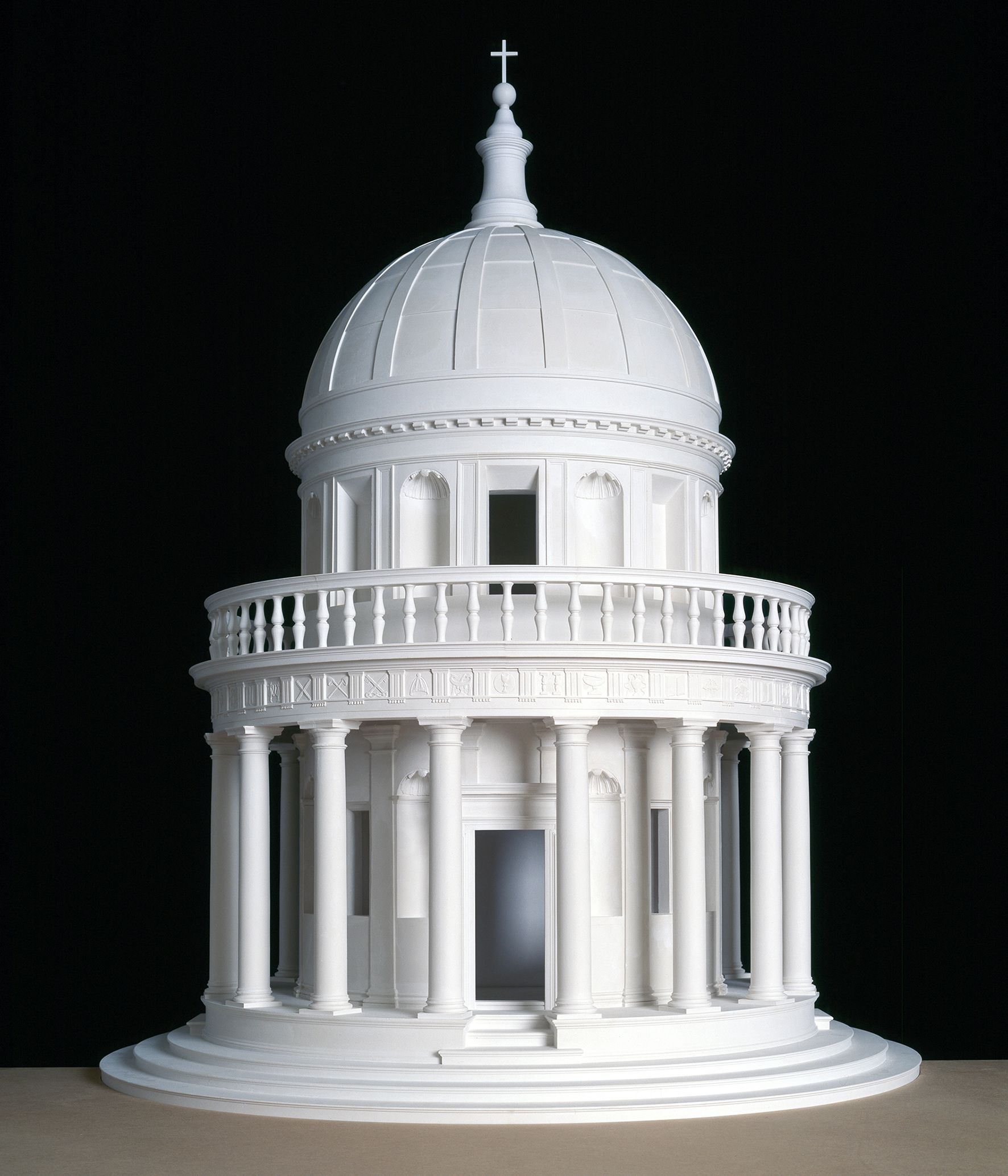
Model of the Tempietto del Bramante,
Model in scale 1:15
Architectural icon model collection by Oswald Mathias Ungers, Cologne

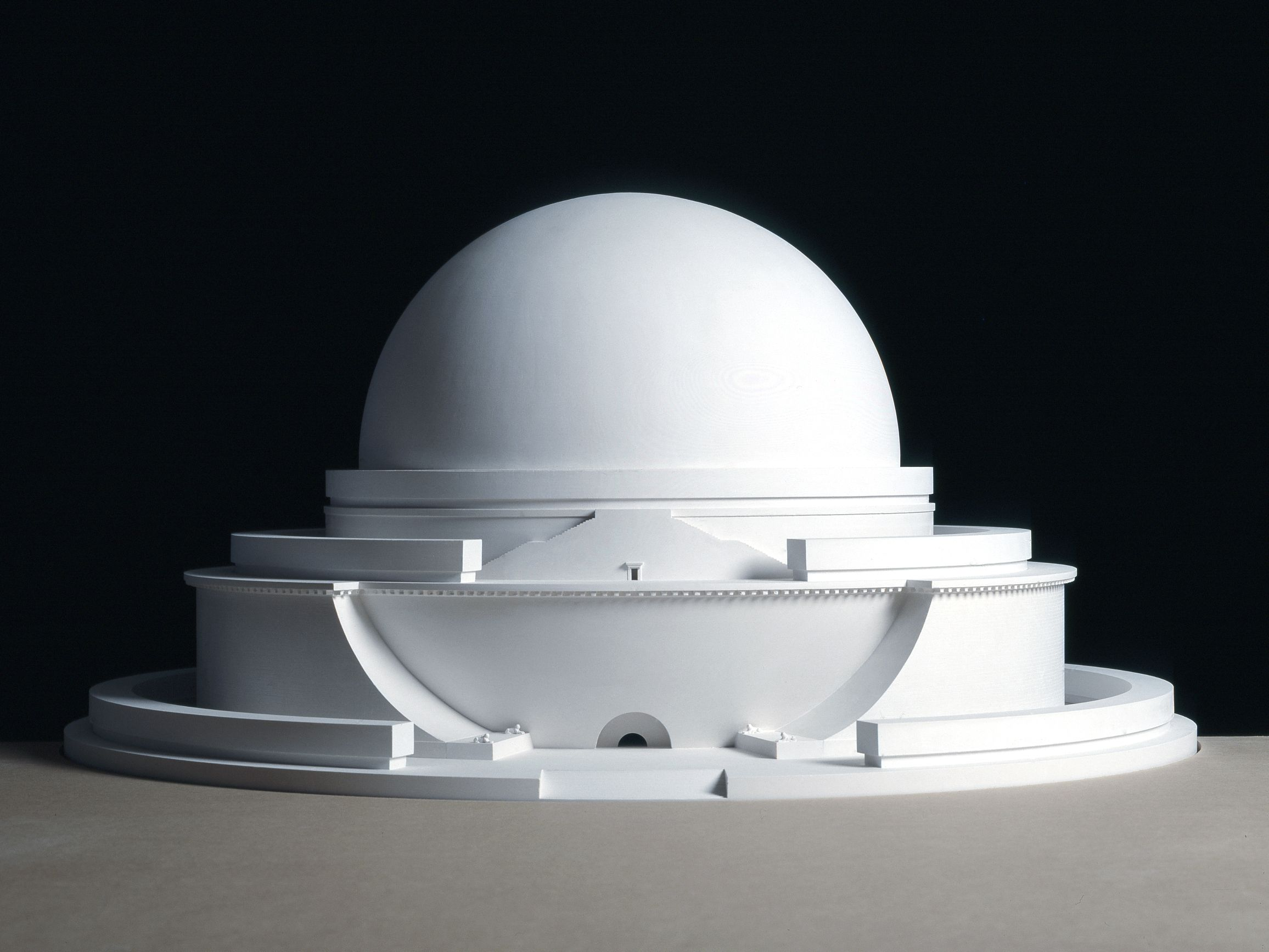
Model of the
Kenothaph for Isaac Newton,
Model in scale 1:400
Architectural icon model collection by Oswald Mathias Ungers, Cologne

Grimm manufactures all his architectural models in pure-white Alabaster gypsum., as this material has a neutral effect and is well suited for the presentation of fine details due to its properties. For recurring parts of buildings, such as columns, he creates silicone moulds. He also works with templates and develops his own tools if necessary. As plaster is heavy, the models have a wooden substructure. For the model of the Parthenon alone, Grimm needed 200 kilograms of gypsum. and over a year to complete the construction. While one always imagines something small with the word model, Grimm's works are by no means small: For example, the model of the Pantheon measures 74 × 170 × 97 cm and his other models also have similar dimensions. "After a long period of work, an architecture emerges as a sculpture that is as unique as ancient figures – just like the techniques of working with plaster, which only a few have mastered and which require a great deal of experience."

The magazine Architectural Digest refers to Grimm as the Cologne Model–Michelangelo in its theme book Best of Germany.

== Bronze reliefs in public space ==
Since 2011 Grimm has been documenting the landscape and structural change in the Cologne district Vogelsang, Cologne from the rural area to the industrial park "Triotop". The contractor for this work was the businessman Anton Bausinger (construction company Friedrich Wassermann). The bronze reliefs are each 1 × 1 metre in size and are positioned at the Belvedere Bridge in Cologne. The spatial situations from the following years are depicted in detail: 1893, 1926, 1934, 1975, 2000, 2010 and 2025. So far (2019) six of the bronze sculptures have been realized and can be viewed on location.

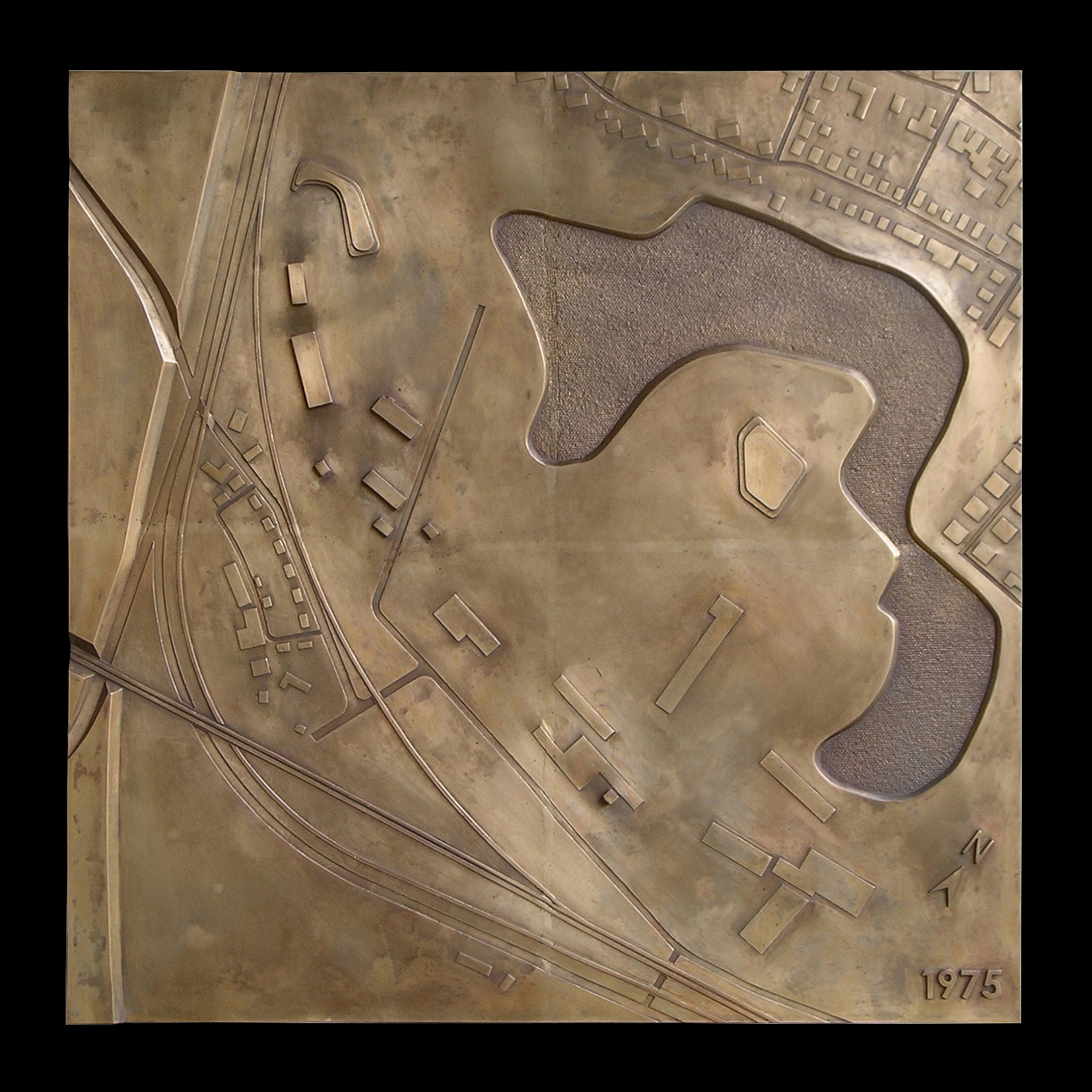
Transformations - The history of an area in Cologne-Vogelsang
(1893–2010), here depiction of the situation in 1975, bronze relief

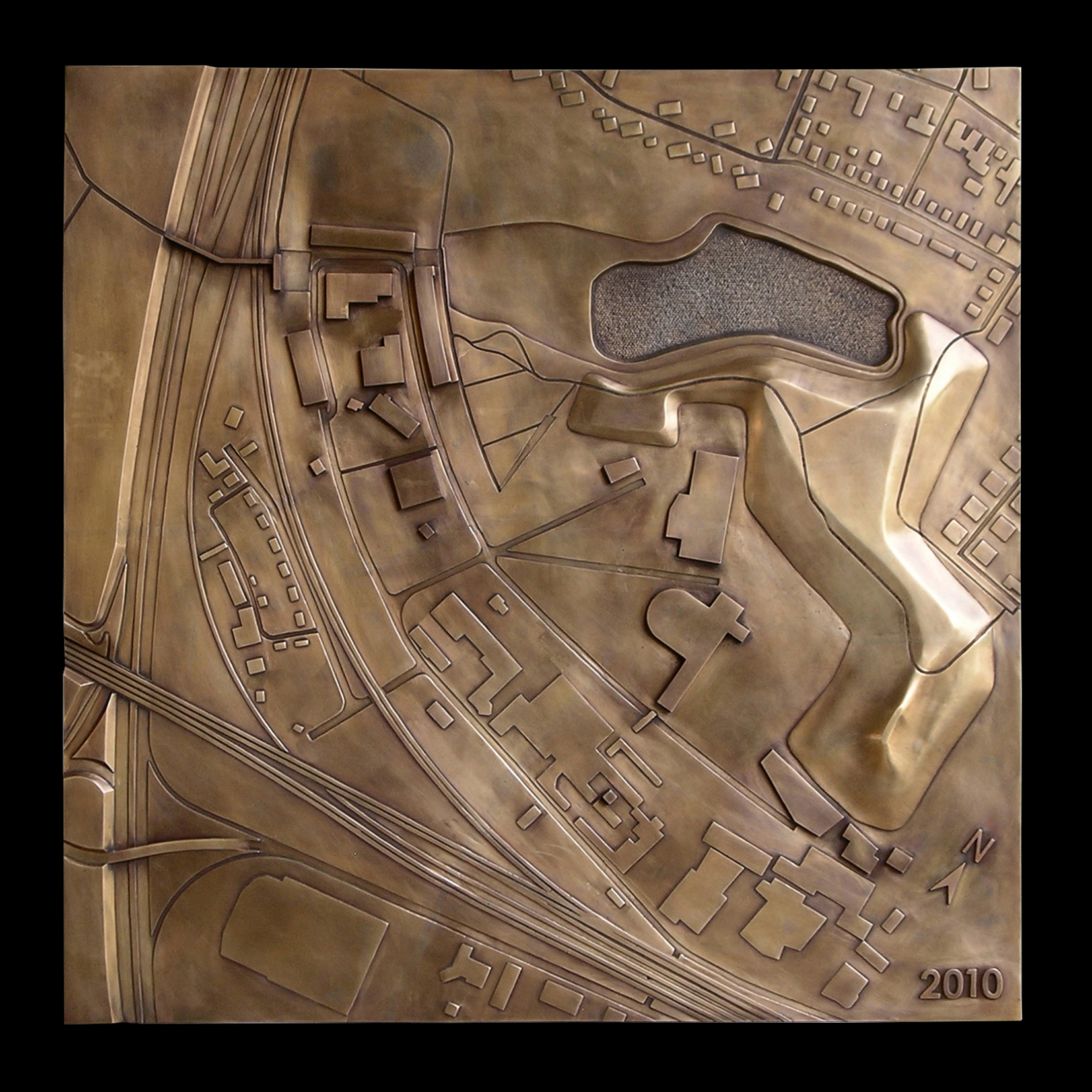
Transformations - The history of an area in Cologne-Vogelsang
(1893–2010), here depiction of the situation in 2010, bronze relief

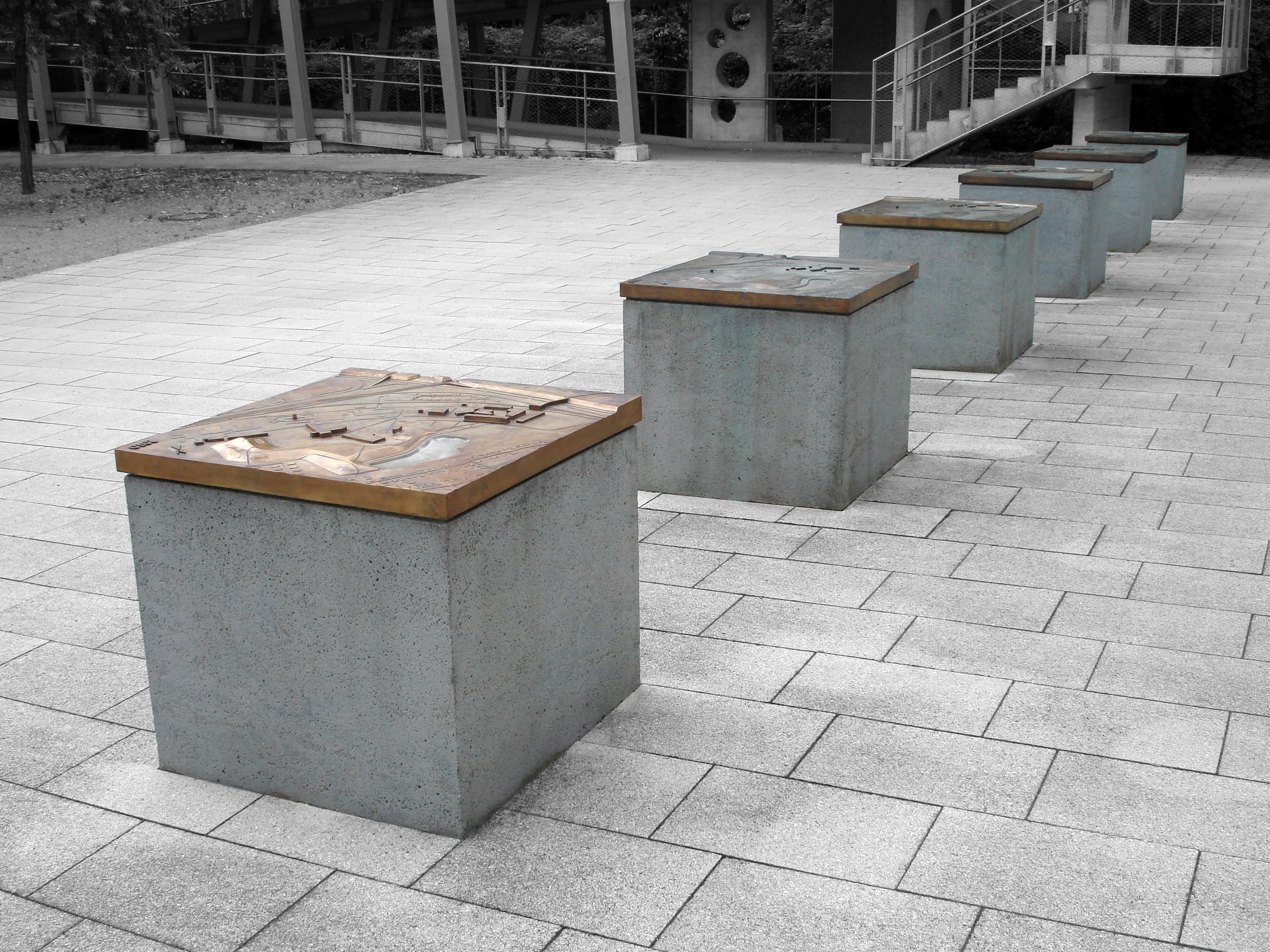
Transformations - The history of an area in Cologne-Vogelsang
(1893–2010), here general view of the hitherto existing reliefs, bronze relief

== Reconstruction "Scala del Bramante" ==
During his time as a practice scholarship holder at Villa Massimo in Rome in 2015, Bernd Grimm did research on the Scala del Bramante of the architect Donato Bramante, which is located in the Vatican Museums. It is a spiral staircase built in 1512 to connect the Pope's Palace with the city of Rome. It was built as a stepless ramp (Italian Rampa), therefore Grimm calls his research report Rampa del Bramante.

The staircase is housed in a square tower and has 36 columns of different types. Grimm received permission from the Vatican to measure and photograph the stairs in detail. He subsequently drew up his report. Part of the investigation was the "decoding of the mathematical and geometrical basic structure" of the ramp. In addition, Grimm investigated the structural composition of the columns. In the Classical antiquity and since the Renaissance, so-called order of columns formed an important architectural system with a hierarchy of different types of columns. Grimm in his report revealed that Bramante did not strictly adhere to this system in the construction of his staircase. Thanks to a scholarship from the Rolf Linnenkamp-Stiftung he was able to produce a three-dimensional model of the staircase in stainless steel and birch multiplex in 1:20 scale.

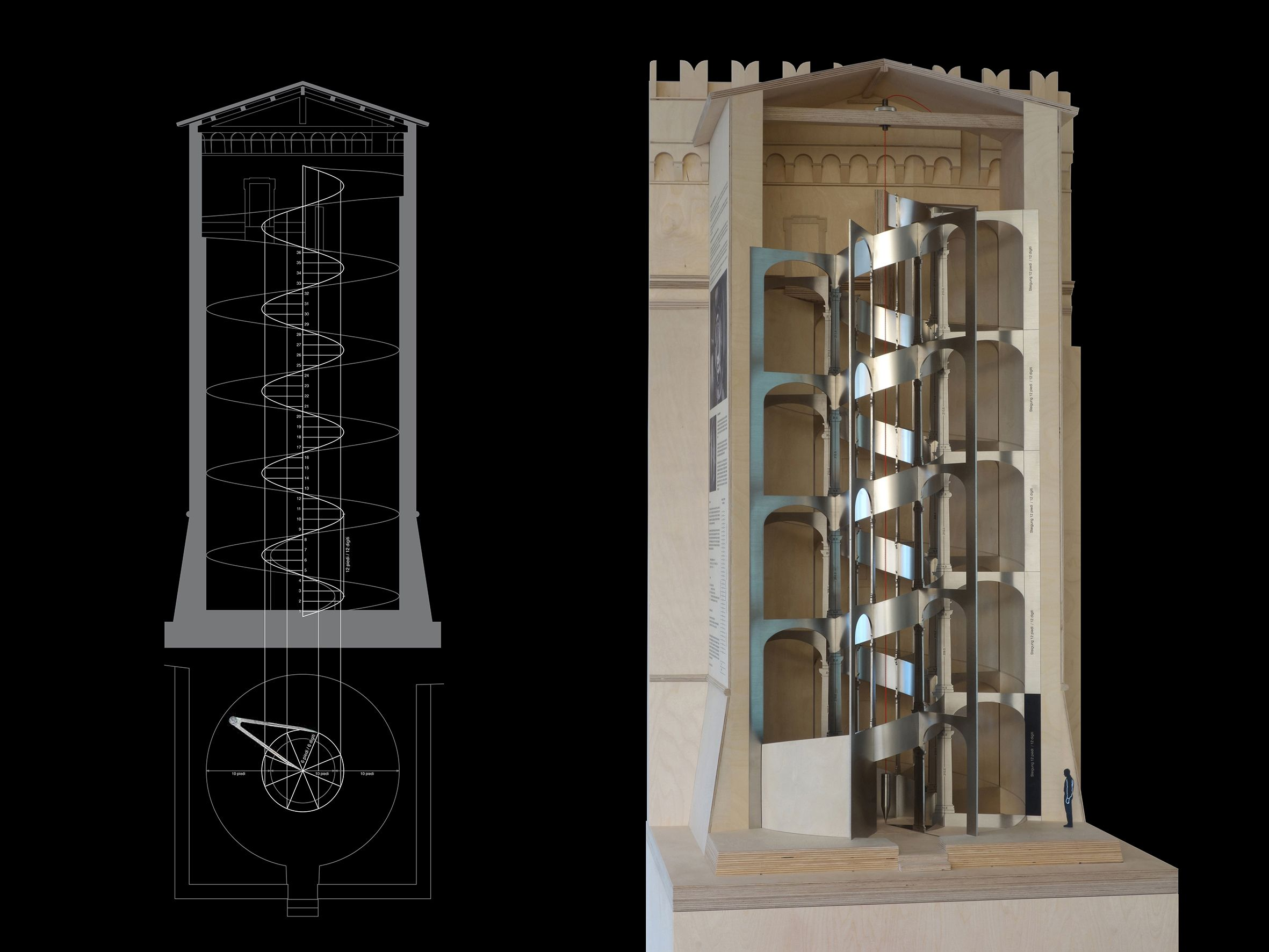
Mathematical-geometric structural analysis of the Scala del Bramante, drawing and model in scale 1:20

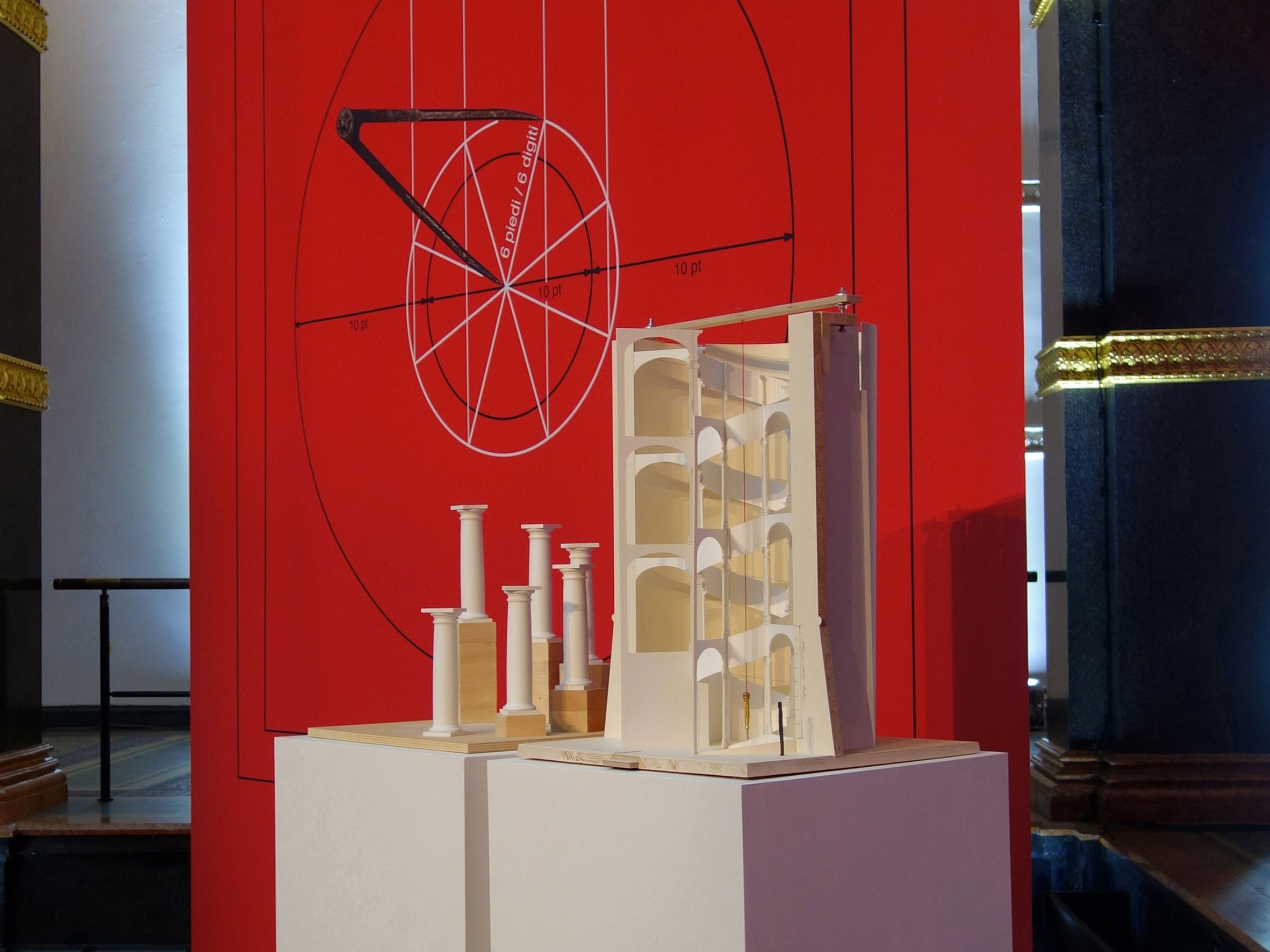
Presentation on the occasion of the exhibition "10 Years Villa Massimo at Martin-Gropius-Bau", Berlin 2016

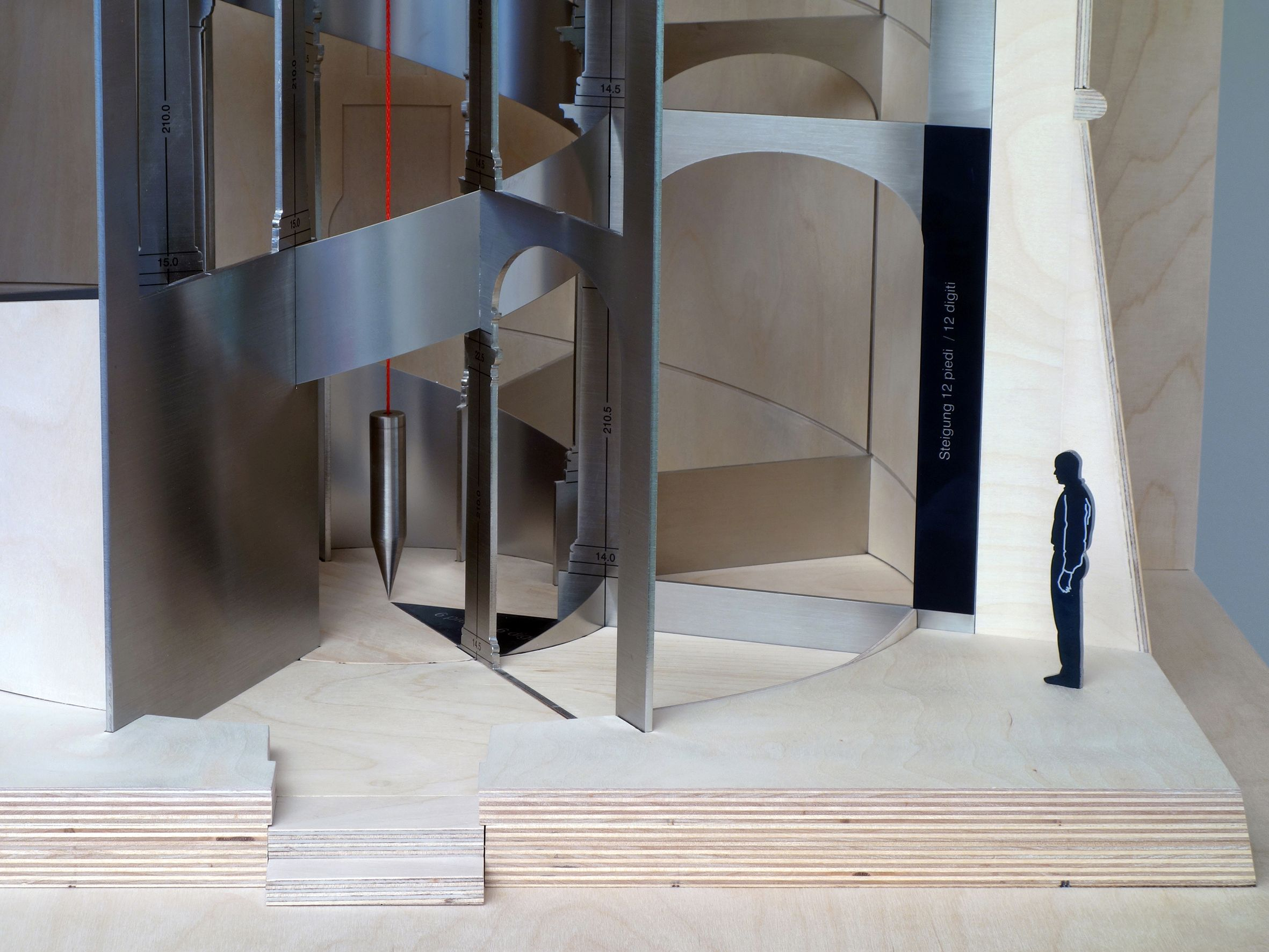
Detail of the mathematical-geometric model of the staircase

The construction and structure of the staircase were made evident by the fact that the columns were only reproduced as outlines in stainless steel. To illustrate the dimensions of the building, Bernd Grimm gave the measurements in centimetres as well as in piedi and digiti, Ancient Roman units of measurement which were also used in the Renaissance – and came to the result:

"The Rampa (Scala) del Bramante is designed and built from a single point. Based on a simple geometric structure that always allows a reference to the center, a high precision in the positioning of the components is achieved. [...] The exceptional quality of the spiral ramp lies in its strong core design idea, namely to combine simple and ideal geometric shapes with column orders, as an important element of architectural design."
(In German: "Die Rampa (Scala) del Bramante ist von einem einzigen Punkt aus konzipiert und verwirklicht. Auf der Grundlage einer einfachen geometrischen Struktur, die immer einen Bezug zum Zentrum ermöglicht, ist eine hohe Präzision in der Positionierung der Bauelemente erreicht. […] Die außergewöhnliche Qualität der Wendelrampe liegt in ihrem starken entwurflichen Kerngedanken, nämlich einfache und ideale geometrische Formen mit den Säulenordnungen, als wichtiges Element baukünstlerischer Gestaltung, zu verbinden.")

=== Other building surveys and reconstructions by Grimm ===
- 1987: Palazzo Spada,
- 1987: L’edicola di Leone X., Castel Sant'Angelo, Rome, Italy
- 1989: Basilika St. Vitus (Ellwangen), Ellwangen (Jagst), Germany
- 1989–1990: Temple of Mars Ultor, Measurement of the capital, Rome, Italy
- 1995: Ursulinenkirche St. Corpus Christi, Cologne
- 1997: St. Kolumba, Cologne, Enclosure walls
- 2002: Putbus Palace, Putbus, reconstruction and model in alabaster gypsum, model in scale 1:50
- 2009: Santa Maria del Priorato Church, Rome, Italy, Architect Giovanni Battista Piranesi, Model in scale 1:50

== Architectural icons of the Oswald Mathias Ungers Collection ==
- 1993: Parthenon, Athens, 447–438 BC, model in scale 1:50
- 1995: Pantheon Rom, 118–128 BC, model in scale 1:50
- 2000: Cheop's pyramid, Giza, Completion ca. 2580 BC, model in scale 1:250
- 2001: Castel del Monte by Friedrich II, Apulia, 1240–1250, model in scale 1:70
- 2001: Tiempietto del Bramante, Rome, 1502, Architect: Donato Bramante, model in scale 1:15
- 2002: Kenotaph for Isaac Newton, 1784, Architect: Étienne-Louis Boullée, model in 1:400 scale
- 2002: Casa del Fascio, Como, Architect: Giuseppe Terragni, model in scale 1:60
- 2003: Mausoleum at Halicarnassus, Bodrum, circa 370–350 BC, model in scale 1:66
- 2004: Mausoleum of Theoderic, Ravenna, circa 520 AD, model in scale 1:20
- 2005: Villa Capra "La Rotonda" (Villa Almerico Capra Valmarana), Vicenza, 1565–1569 AD, architect: Andrea Palladio, model in scale of 1:20

== Lecturing experience ==
- 1993–2000: Fachhochschule Köln, Department of Design
- 2002–2004: Braunschweig University of Art, Department of Industrial Design
- 2005: Leibniz University Hannover, Department Architectur
- 2008: Technical University of Dortmund, Faculty of Construction Engineering
- 2016: HafenCity University Hamburg, Summer Studio "The Rural in the City"
- 2018: University of the Arts Bremen, Department of Industrial Design

== Group exhibitions (selection) ==
- 1999: O. M. Ungers: Zeiträume – Architektur – Kontext, Kunsthalle Köln, Cologne, Germany
- 1999: Bauaufnahme Ursulinenkirche Köln, University of Fine Arts of Hamburg, Hamburg, Germany
- 2000: Von der Renaissance zur Gegenwart, University of Fine Arts of Hamburg, Hamburg, Germany
- 2003: ZwischenRaumZeit, gallery suitcasearchitecture, Berlin, Germany
- 2003: Via Culturalis, Romano-Germanic Museum, Cologne, Germany
- 2004: ArchiSkulptur, Beyeler Foundation, Basel, Switzerland
- 2006: O. M. Ungers: Kosmos der Architektur, Neue Nationalgalerie, Berlin, Germany
- 2012: Das Architekturmodell – Werkzeug, Fetisch, kleine Utopie, German Architecture Museum, Frankfurt/Main
- 2015: Abschlusspräsentation der Stipendiaten, Deutsche Akademie Villa Massimo, Rome, Italy
- 2016: Das Architekturmodell – ein Medium in Theorie und Praxis, ETH Zurich, Department Architecture, Zürich, Switzerland
- 2016: 10 Jahre Villa Massimo, Vorstellung des Forschungsberichts Scala del Bramante, Martin-Gropius-Bau, Berlin, Germany
- 2017: Globes. Architecture & Sciences explorent le monde, Cité de l'Architecture et du Patrimoine, Paris, France
