= Oswald Mathias Ungers =

German architect (1926–2007)

- Ungers, in c. 1990
- Born: 12 July 1926; Kaisersesch, Germany
- Died: 30 September 2007 (aged 81); Cologne, Germany
- Occupation: Architect
- Buildings: Messe Torhaus, Frankfurt; Wallraf-Richartz Museum, Cologne

Oswald Mathias Ungers (12 July 1926 – 30 September 2007) was a German architect and architectural theorist, known for his rationalist designs and the use of cubic forms. Among his notable projects are museums in Frankfurt, Hamburg and Cologne.

== Biography ==
Oswald Mathias Ungers was born in Kaisersesch in the Eifel region. From 1947 to 1950 he studied architecture at the University of Karlsruhe under Egon Eiermann. Since 1950 he was a partner to Helmut Goldschmidt, set up his own architectural practice in Cologne in 1954 and opened offices in Berlin in 1964, Frankfurt in 1974 and Karlsruhe in 1983.

He was a professor at Technische Universität Berlin from 1963 to 1967 and served as the dean of the faculty of architecture from 1965 to 1967. In 1968 he moved to the United States, where he became the chair of the department of architecture at Cornell University from 1969 to 1975. In 1971 he became a member of the American Institute of Architects. He was also a visiting professor at Harvard University (1973 and 1978) and the University of California, Los Angeles (1974/75). He returned to Germany in 1976, becoming a visiting professor at the University of Applied Arts Vienna (1979/80) and a full professor at the Kunstakademie Düsseldorf (1986).

Ungers died on 30 September 2007 from pneumonia. He was married to Liselotte Gabler (1926–2010) and had one son, the architect Simon Ungers, and two daughters.

== On his work ==
Ungers' buildings especially in his last decades of his life, are characterized by strict geometrical design grid. Basic design elements of his architecture are often elementary forms such as square, circle or cube and sphere, which Ungers varied and transformed in his designs. As an architectural theorist and university lecturer, Ungers developed what his critics called "quadratism", whereas observers, as Arata Isozaki, "directly involved in the events but who remained detached" noted that "Ungers' and Rossi's early work coincides with the emergence of rationalism".

In doing so, he resorted to the teaching of Jean-Nicolas-Louis Durand who had published in 1820 his pattern books with geometric prototypes for "any building". In his formal language, Ungers explicitly referred to elementary architectural design elements that are independent of contemporary tastes. His historical role models in the history of architecture come mainly from Roman-Greek antiquity. His work was therefore occasionally criticized as formalistic. In connection with his construction on the Frankfurt Messe grounds, there was often talk of a "new clarity". Like hardly any other architect, Ungers has remained true to his once chosen formal language for decades. He was one of the leading theoreticians of Second Modernism.

The rather formal initial view of Unger’s design methods as "quadratism" is corrected by reconsidering his early, more complex works, which — as in the case of the 1964 design for the student housing in Enschede, for example — deal with typological and morphological transformations in the spirit of Ramon Lull’s “Ars Combinatoria”. This combinatorial strategy was supplemented by Ungers in 1976–77 with “DESIGNING AND THINKING IN IMAGES, METAPHORS, AND ANALOGIES", at a time, when the silhouette of the Magritte man played a significant role as a guiding image.

Beyond this perspective, another defining characteristic of "OMU" was his approach—developed as early as its formative years—of viewing architecture within the context of its urban environment and developing his projects out of this dialogue. Its catchphrase for this concept, inspired by Peter Smithson, was "architecture as found." The most significant examples of this attitude were the unbuilt "Grünzug-Süd" competition in Cologne the realized project of the "Neue Stadt" with Karl-Lothar Dietzsch and the conceptual model of the "City within a City," developed for the IBA Berlin during the First Cornell Summer Academy in 1977, in which Berlin, as a "shrinking metropolis," was to be transformed into an urban "Green Archipelago".

O.M. Ungers' office manager in Cologne was Karl-Lothar Dietzsch, who worked with him on his projects for 35 years, beginning in 1953. Well-known staff members at the Ungers office include Max Dudler, Jo. Franzke, Hans Kollhoff, Rem Koolhaas, Rob Krier, Ludwig Leo, Christoph Mäckler, Franz Oswald, Jürgen Sawade, Simon Ungers and Eun Young Yi.

== The Archive for Architectural Research (UAA) ==
Ungers Archive for Architectural Research contains his architecture library, which he began building in the 1950s, as well as the architect's entire artistic legacy. The library focuses on architecture tractate, works on the emergence and further development of perspective and publications on theory of colour. The library includes the first edition of Vitruv's De Architectura Libri Decem of 1495 as well as rare editions such as the Staatliche Bauhaus in Weimar 1919–1923 and publications of the Russian avantgarde, for example Von zwei Quadraten by the architect El Lissitzky. Together with his estate it is housed in the library cube of Ungers' listed building in Belvederestraße 60, Müngersdorf and is available to the scientific public for research purposes.

=== Ungers' collection of architectural icons ===
Part of the Ungers Archive for architectural Research are the models of historical architectural icons which the diploma designer and architectural model builder Bernd Grimm built in collaboration with the architect. Ungers goal was to create a "three-dimensional collection" of historically significant buildings. The models are made of white Alabaster gypsum and have a wooden substructure.

- 1993: Parthenon, Athens, 447–438 BC, model in scale 1:50
- 1995: Pantheon Rom, 118–128 BC, model in scale 1:50
- 2001: Castel del Monte by Friedrich II, Apulia, 1240–1250, model in scale 1:70
- 2002: Kenotaph for Isaac Newton, 1784, Architect: Étienne-Louis Boullée, model in 1:400 scale
- 2001: Tiempietto del Bramante, Rome, 1502, Architect: Donato Bramante, model in scale 1:15
- 2004: Mausoleum of Theoderic, Ravenna, circa 520 AD, model in scale 1:20

== Selected projects ==
Major renovation and expansion of the Pergamon Museum in Berlin (O.M. Ungers/Kleihues + Kleihues), completion phase 2026

- 1958–1959 Haus Ungers in Lindenthal, Cologne
- 1979–1984 German Architecture Museum in Frankfurt
- 1980 The Presence of the Past exhibition at the Venice Biennale
- 1980–1983 Messe Torhaus in Frankfurt
- 1981–1984 Konstantinplatz in Trier
- 1983–1991 Baden State Library in Karlsruhe
- 1986 Former main building of the Alfred Wegener Institute for Polar and Marine Research in Bremerhaven
- 1993–1996 Friedrichstadt-Passagen (Quartier 205) in Berlin
- 1994 Residence of the German ambassador in Washington D.C.
- 1994–1995 Haus ohne Eigenschaften (house without qualities) in Cologne
- 1995 Hamburger Kunsthalle, Galerie der Gegenwart
- 1998–2001 Dorotheenhöfe, Berlin
- 2001 Wallraf-Richartz Museum in Cologne
- 2006 Entrance to the ruins of a Roman bath in Trier

Proposed or under construction

- In 2000, he won an architectural competition to redesign the Pergamon Museum in Berlin. His controversial plan proposes large alterations to the building complex, which has remained unchanged since 1930. The rebuilding was scheduled to be completed in 2025. It will open on 4 June 2027.

== Gallery ==
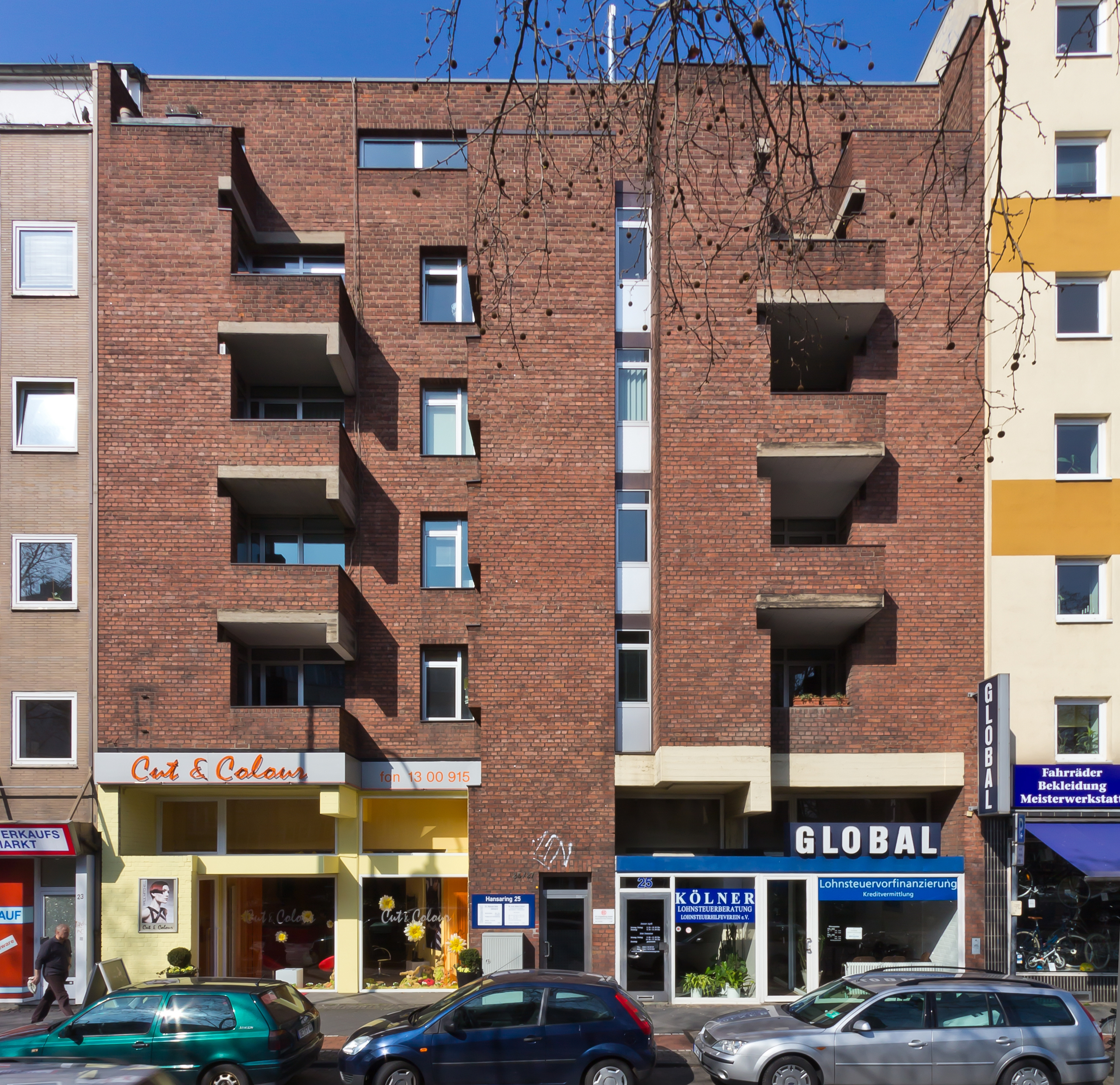
Residential and commercial building (historic landmark), Cologne (1959)

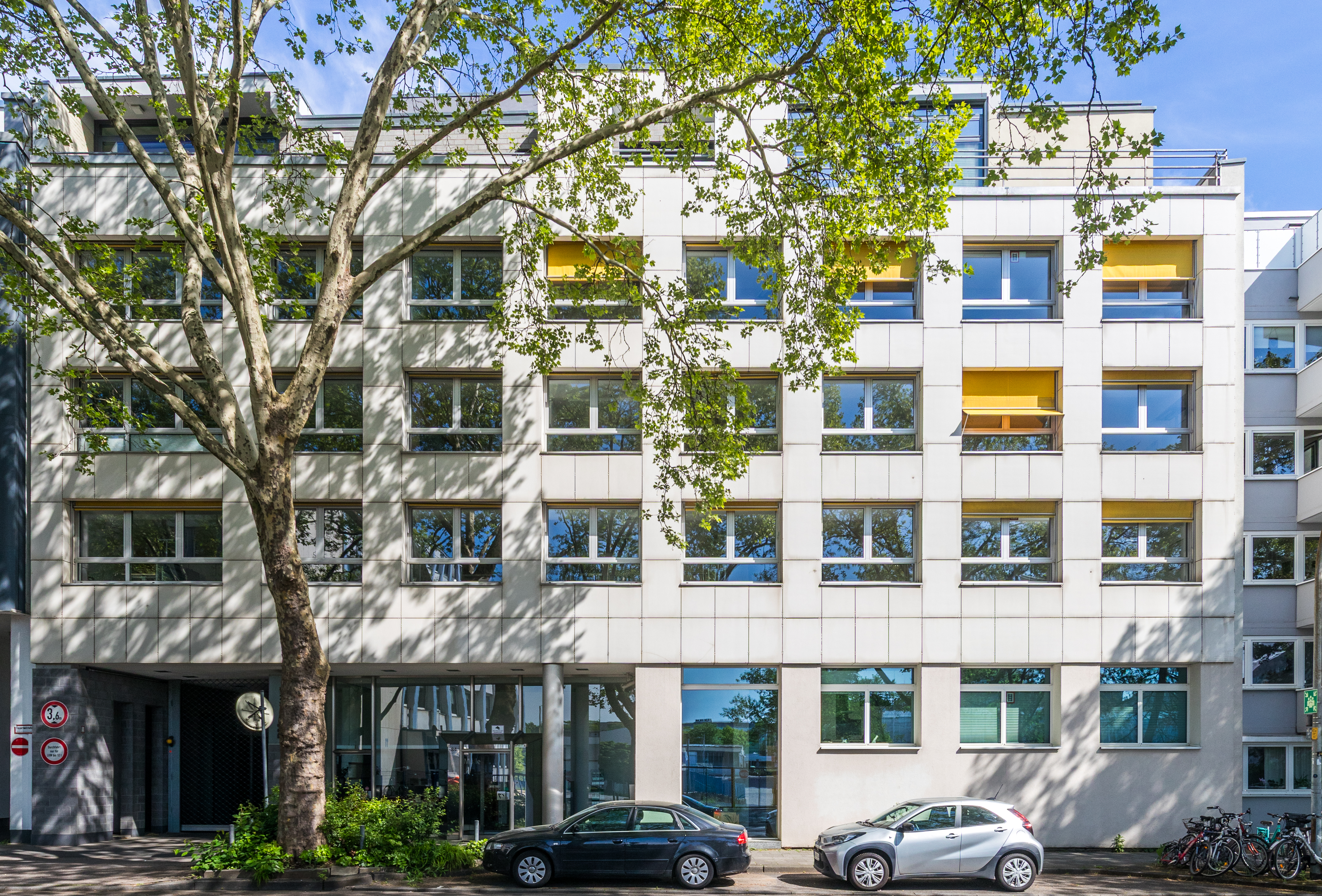
Office Building for a media publishing company, Cologne (1960-1964)

"Neue Stadt" Seeberg housing development, Cologne (1961-1964

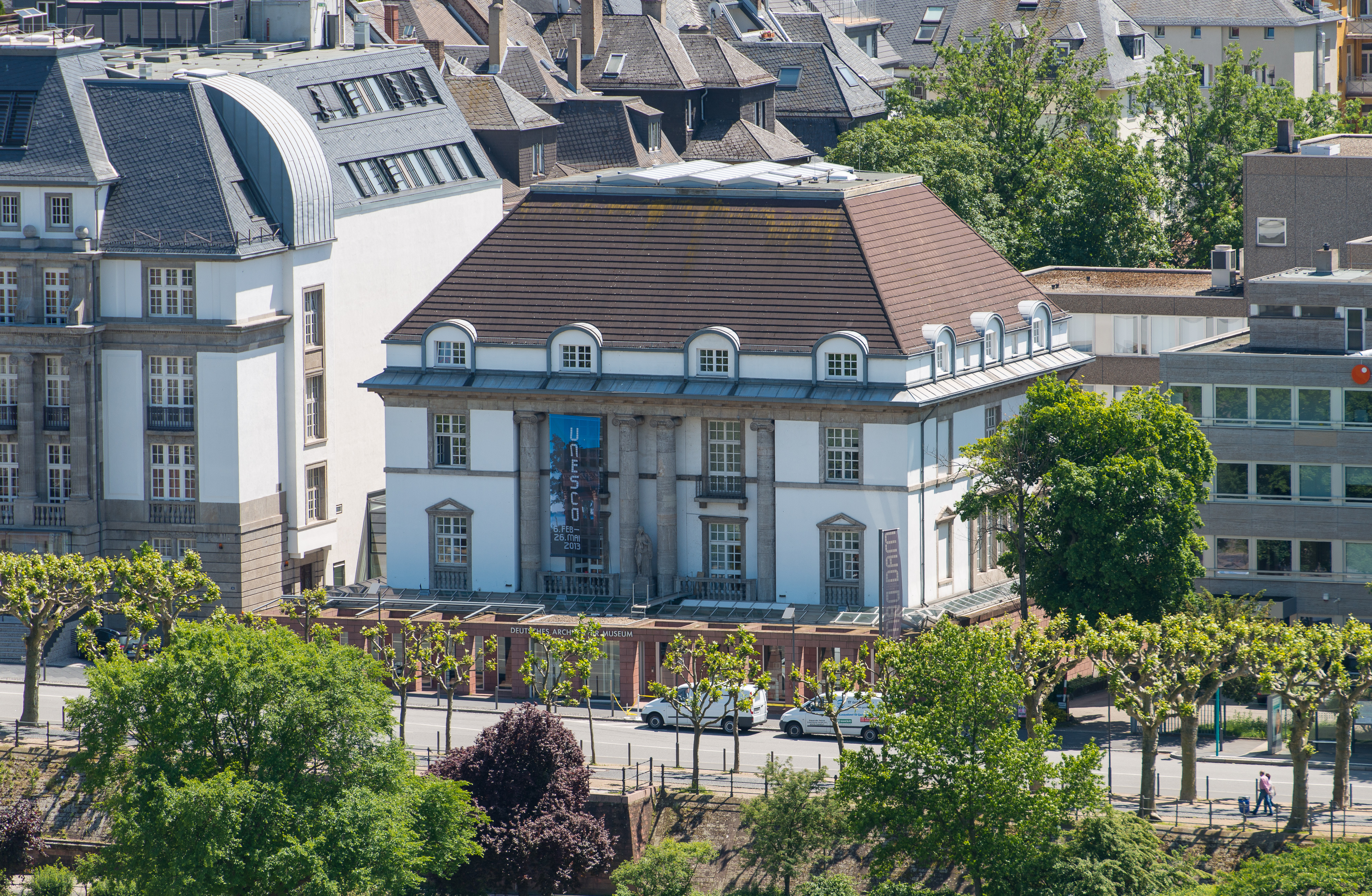
German Architecture Museum in Frankfurt (1979-1984)

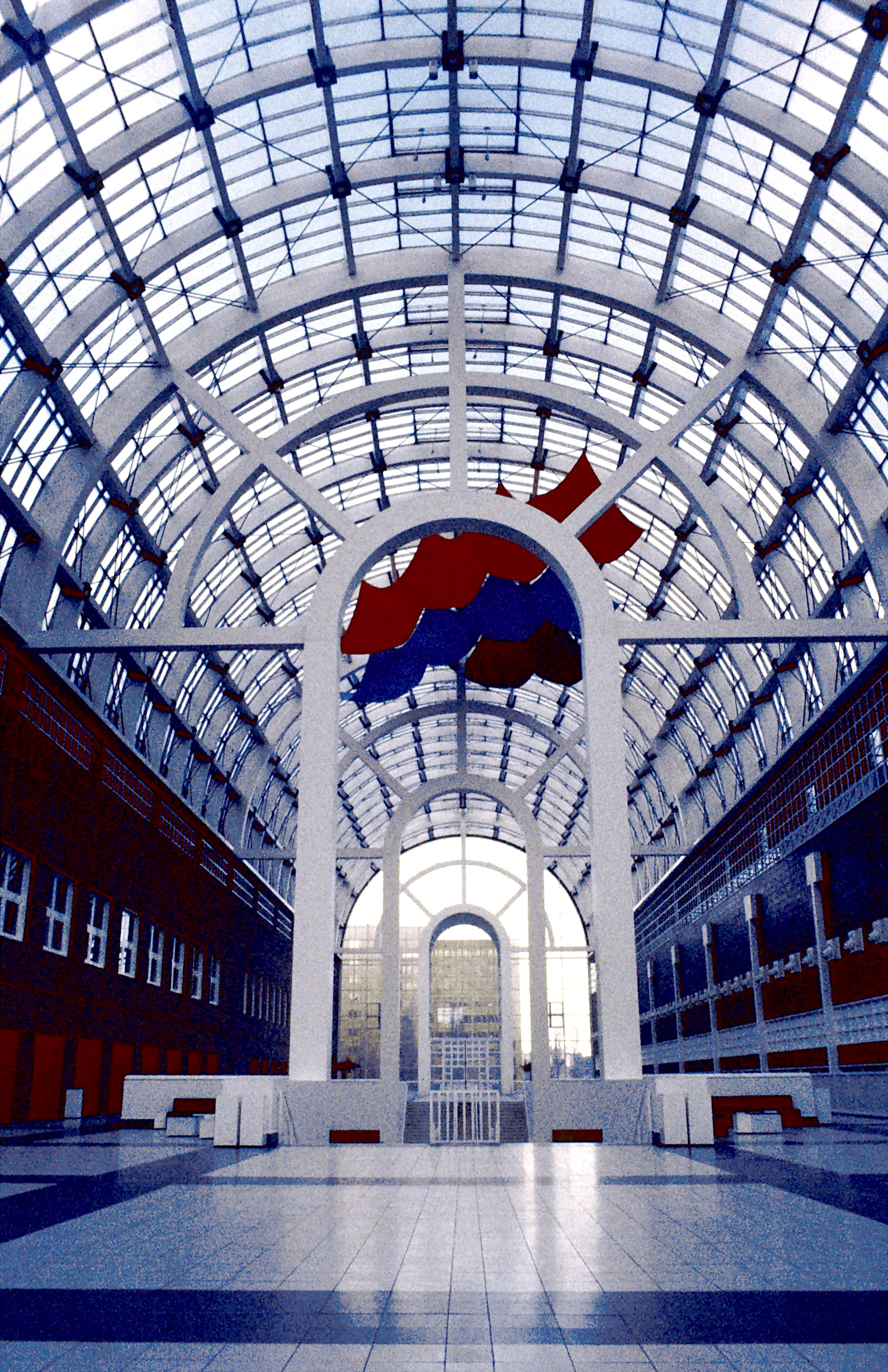
"Galleria" building at the Frankfurt Trade Fair (1980-83)

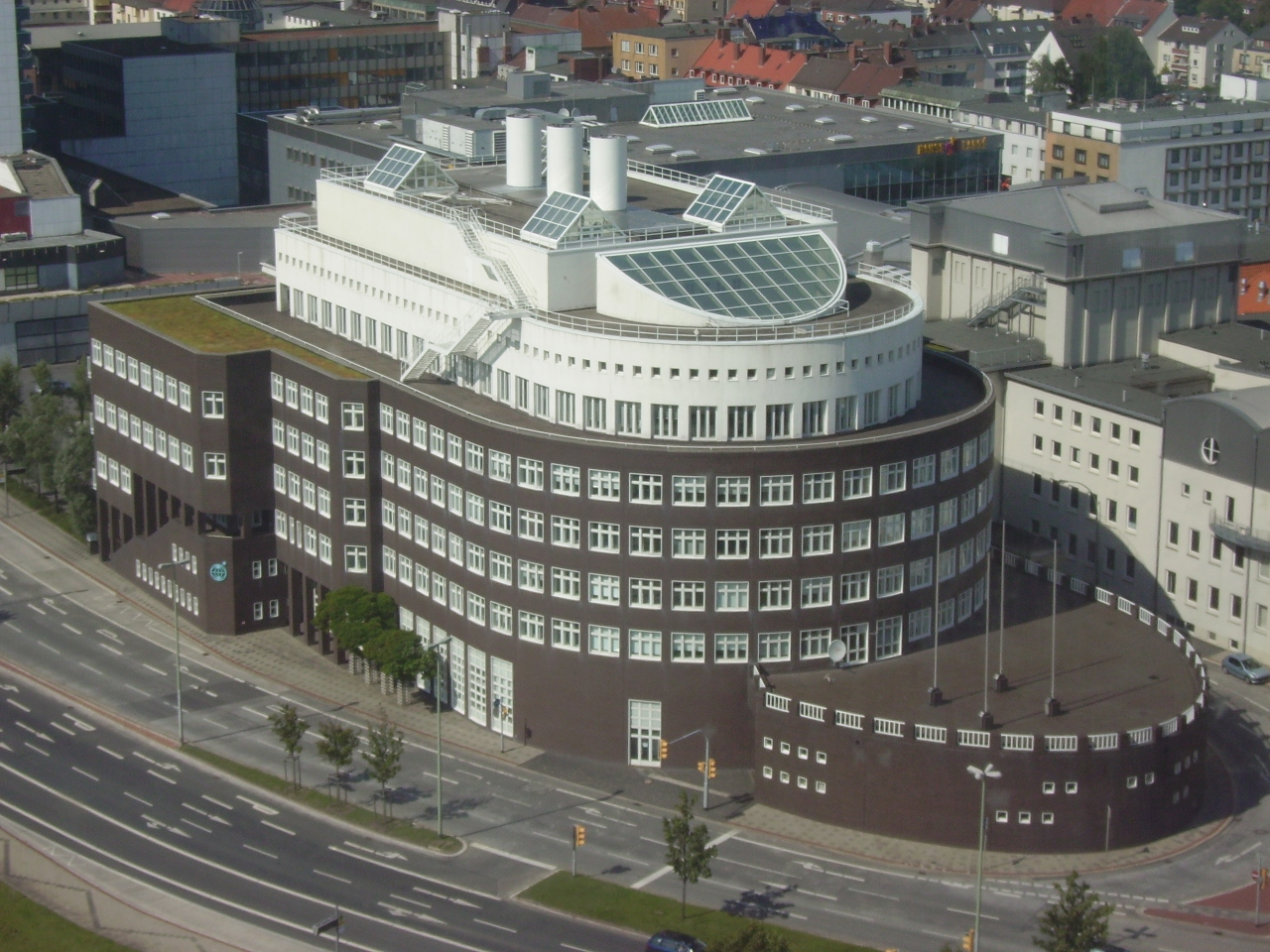
Alfred Wegener Institute for Polar and Marine Research in Bremerhaven (1980-1984)

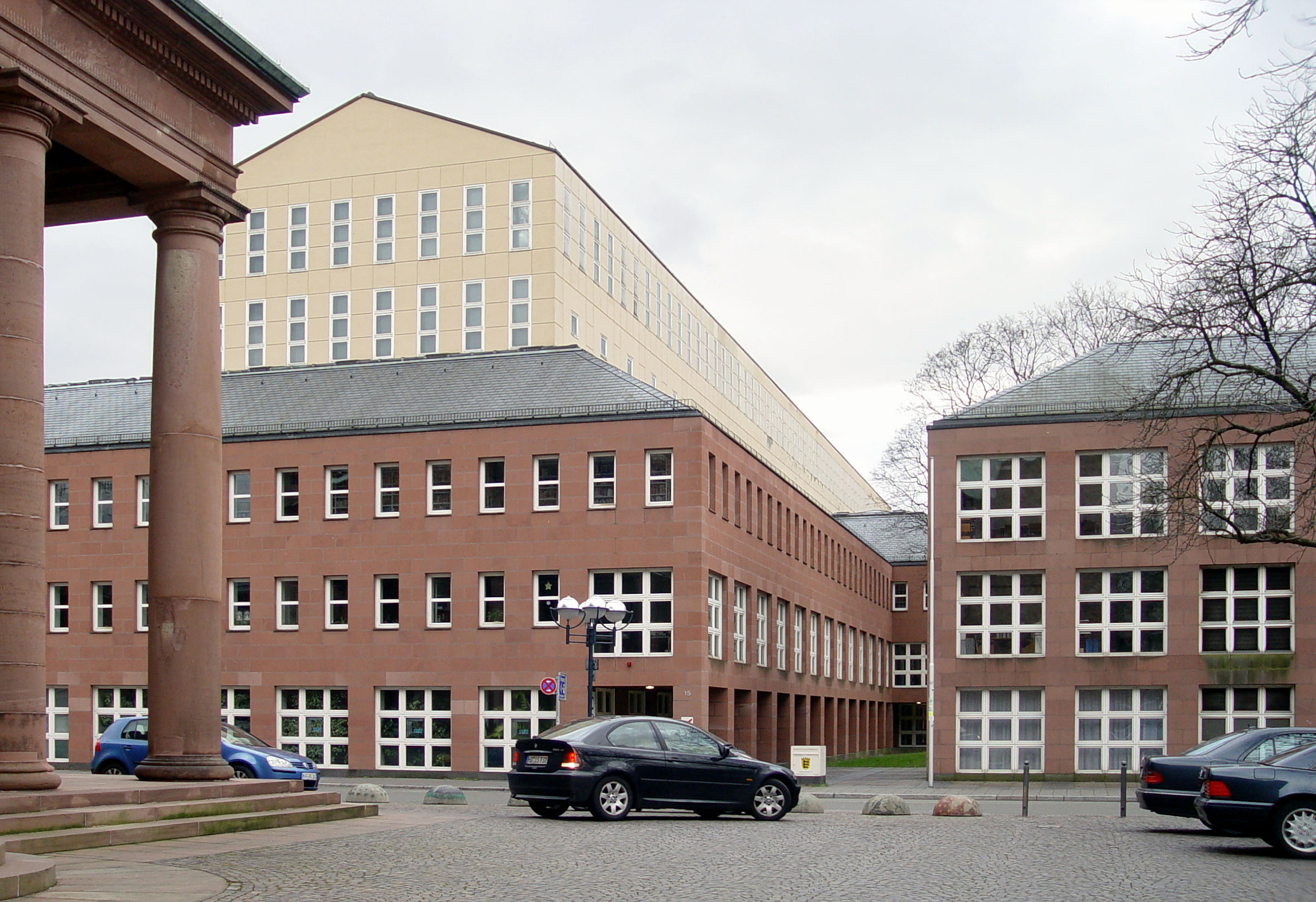
Badische Landesbibliothek in Karlsruhe (1980-1991)

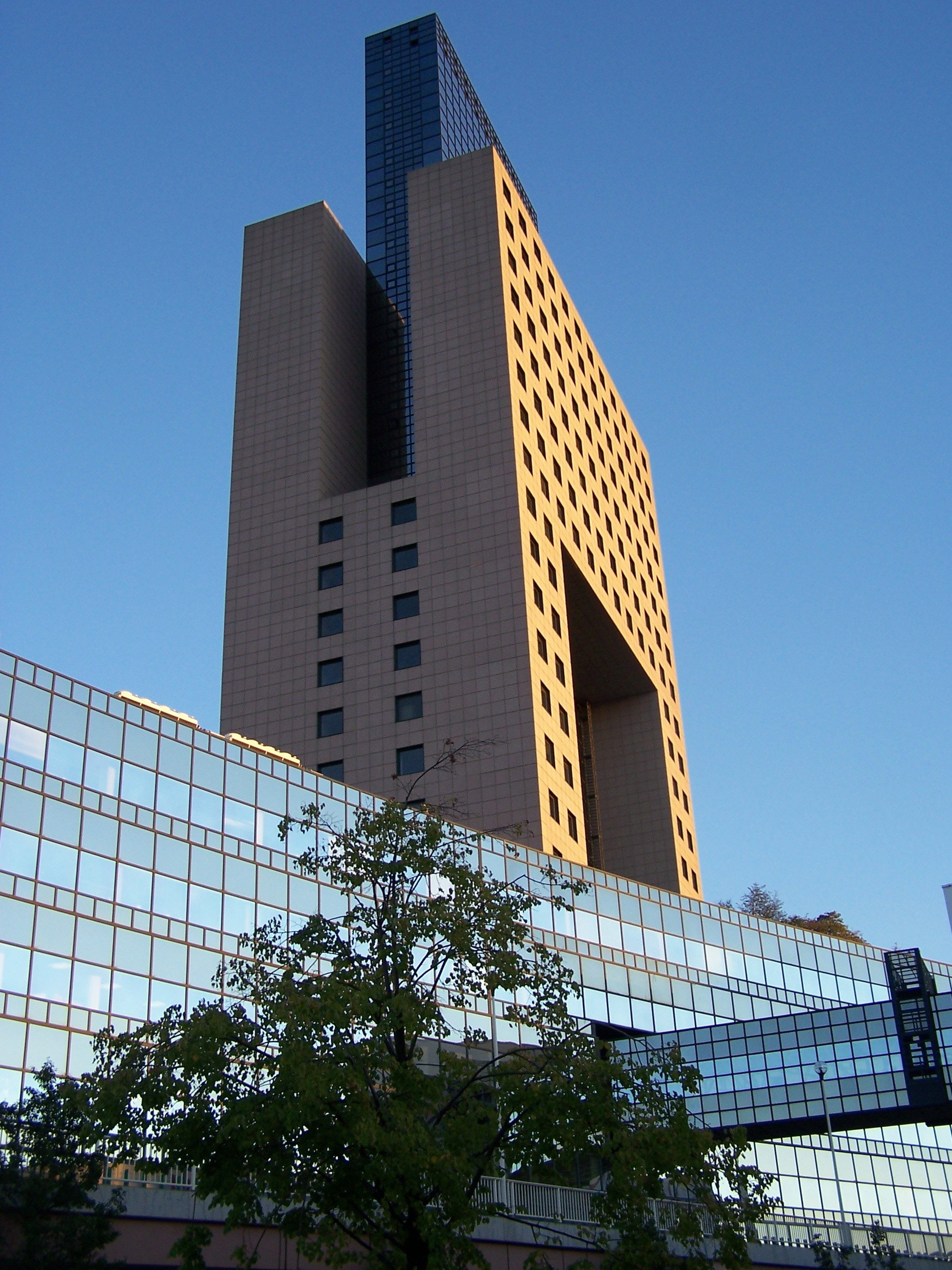
Messe Torhaus in Frankfurt (1983-1984)

New art museum Hamburger Kunsthalle (1986-1996)

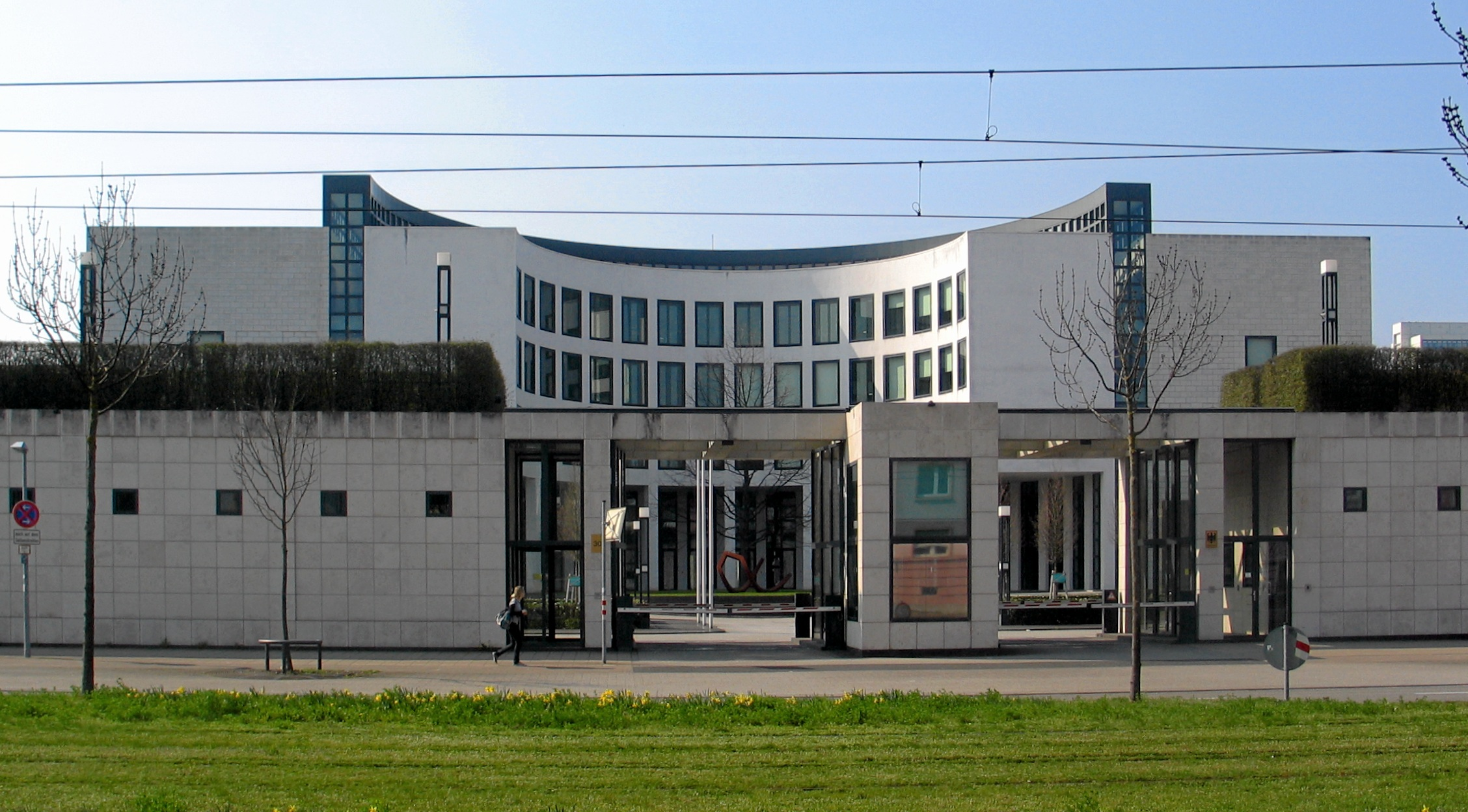
Headquarters of the Public Prosecutor General in Karlsruhe (1986-1998)

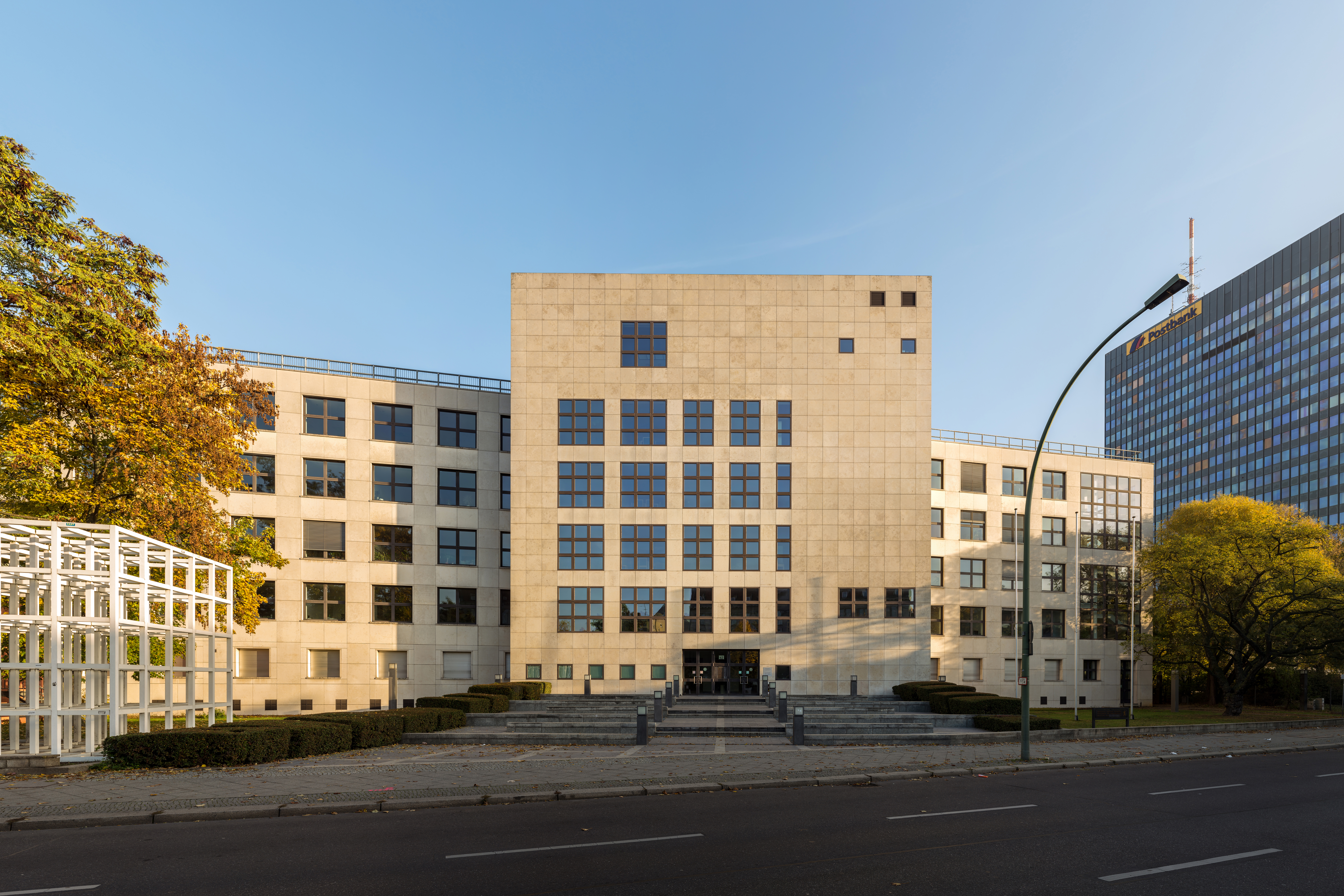
Court of Family Affairs Berlin-Kreuzberg (1989-1995)

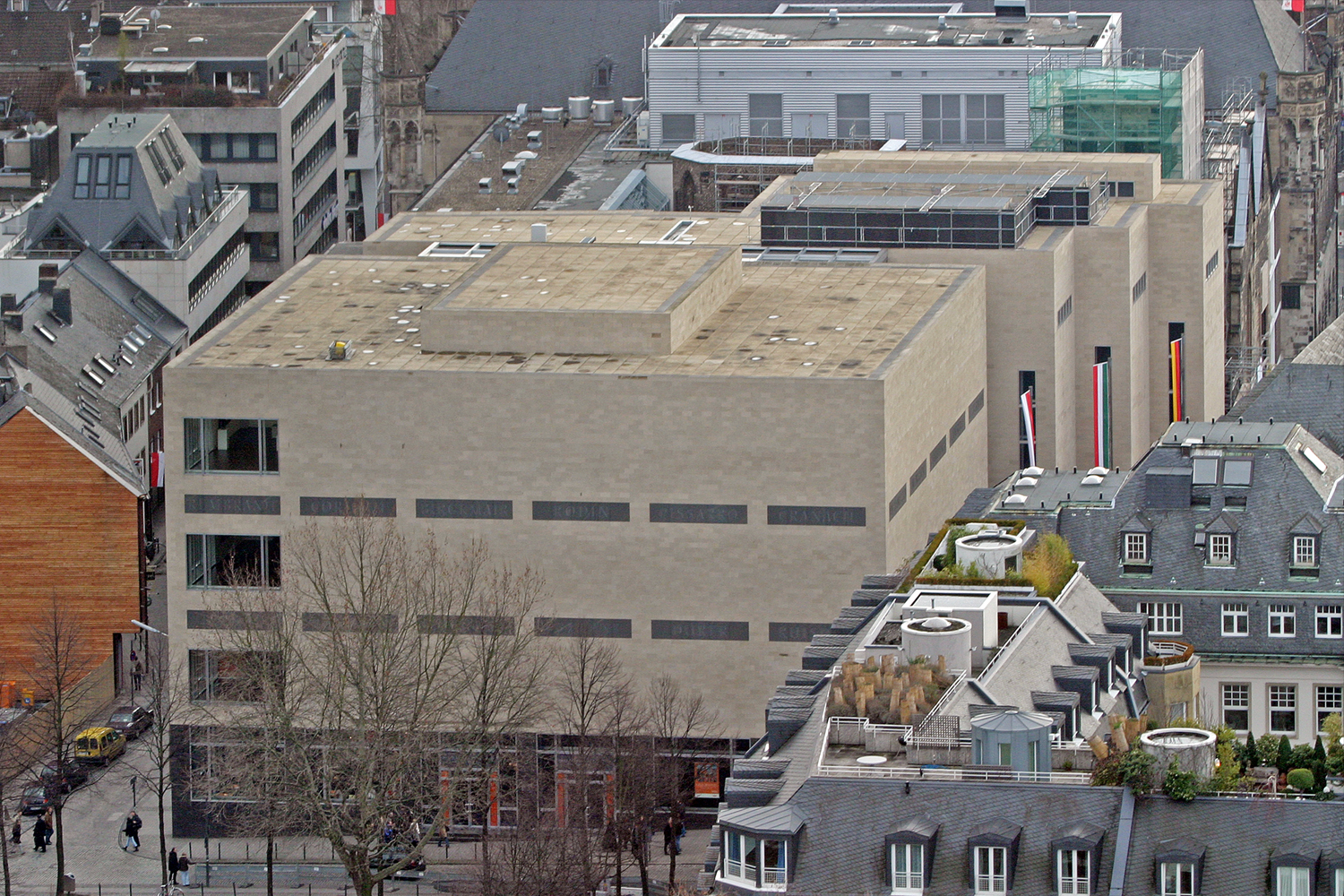
Wallraf-Richartz Museum in Cologne (1996-2001)

== Awards ==
- 1987 Großer BDA Preis, Jürgen Paul (Kunsthistoriker): „O. M. Ungers, der Architekt in seiner Zeit“, der architekt, BDA, 1987, pp: 421-429
- 1997 Commander's Cross of the Order of Merit of the Federal Republic of Germany

== Writings ==
- Ungers, Oswald Mathias (2011). City metaphors (in German). Köln: Walther Konig Verlag. ISBN 978-3-86560-946-5.
- —— (2011). Die Thematisierung der Architektur (in German). Sulgen: Niggli. ISBN 978-3-7212-0698-2.
- —— (1999). Was ich immer schon sagen wollte über die Stadt, wie man sich seine eigenen Häuser baut, und was andere über mich denken: Aphorismen zum Häuserbauen (in German). Wiesbaden Braunschweig: Vieweg. ISBN 978-3-528-08143-0.
- ——; Neumeyer, Fritz (1991). "Entwerfen mit Vorstellungsbildern, Metaphern und Analogien. Anmerkungen zu einem morphologischen Konzept". Architektur 1951 – 1990 (in German). Stuttgart: Dt. Verl.-anst. ISBN 978-3-421-03010-8.
