= Messe Torhaus =

Coordinates: 50°06′41″N 8°38′34″E

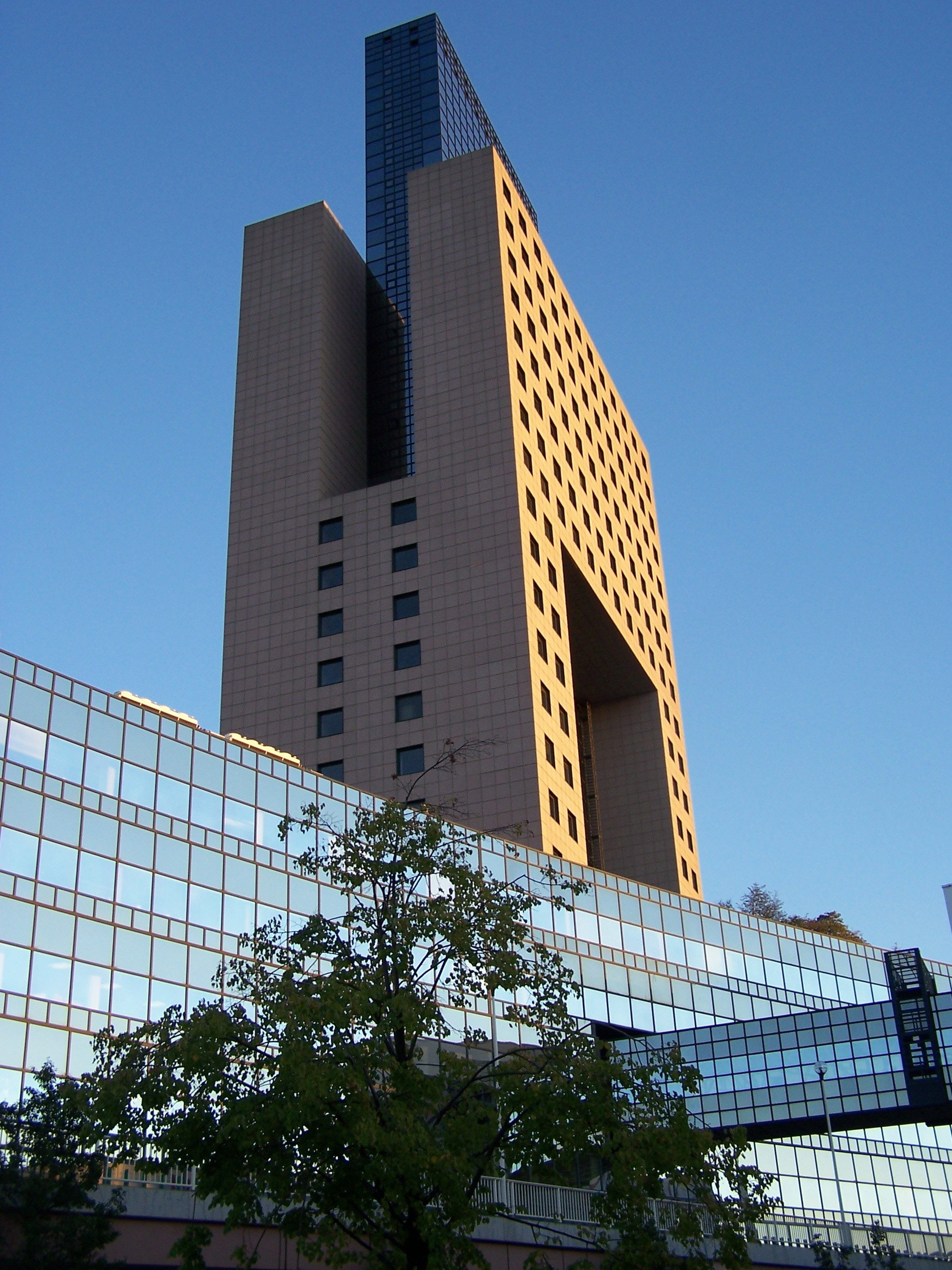
- Interactive map of the Messe Torhaus area

General information
- Type: Commercial offices
- Location: Ludwig-Erhard-Anlage 1 Frankfurt; Hesse, Germany
- Construction started: 1983
- Completed: 1984

Height
- Roof: 117 m (384 ft)

Technical details
- Floor count: 30
- Floor area: 17,000 m^{2} (180,000 sq ft)

Design and construction
- Architect: Oswald Mathias Ungers

Other information
- Public transit access: Frankfurt Messe

Messe Torhaus is a high-rise building in the Bockenheim district of Frankfurt, Germany. It was designed by Oswald Mathias Ungers.

Built by Hochtief, 400 workers constructed the 60,000 ton building in a record time of 13 months from 1983 to 1984. Its unusual shape and use of materials resembles a guillotine. The building houses the administration of Messe Frankfurt as well as services like a kindergarten and the press centre.

The building consists of three interconnected components: from a single triangular concave grows out a building with a red stone façade. He pointed at the front and back is a lot of storeys high, square opening. Through this opening, an inner, spiegelverglaster component is seen, grows out of the outer and reaches about double of its height. It is 117 m high and has 30 floors.

In addition to the headquarters of the Administration Center, the gatehouse, the central point of contact for exhibitors and visitors: The level two and three house all the necessary service facilities of contacts for the stand construction, catering and hostess service throughout the central exhibition, as well as tourist information including accommodation reservation to supermarket, post office and hairdresser. Even with a nursery (level one) can be used by Messe Frankfurt, and the only German trade fair location, it offers in-house opportunity for reflective moments prayer room (level four). Also at level four we find the press center with all service facilities for journalists. From level three of the gatehouse can be reached since January 1999 directly to the Frankfurt Messe S-Bahn station.

In the immediate vicinity is located on the fairgrounds of Messe Frankfurt, the CHP Mainova AG, which serves as a gate house chimney. Therefore, the building is also known as "Frankfurt's most beautiful fireplace".

== See also ==
- List of tallest buildings in Frankfurt
- List of tallest buildings in Germany
