= Messe Frankfurt =

Trade fair in Germany

Coordinates: 50°06′41″N 8°38′54″E

Messe Frankfurt GmbH

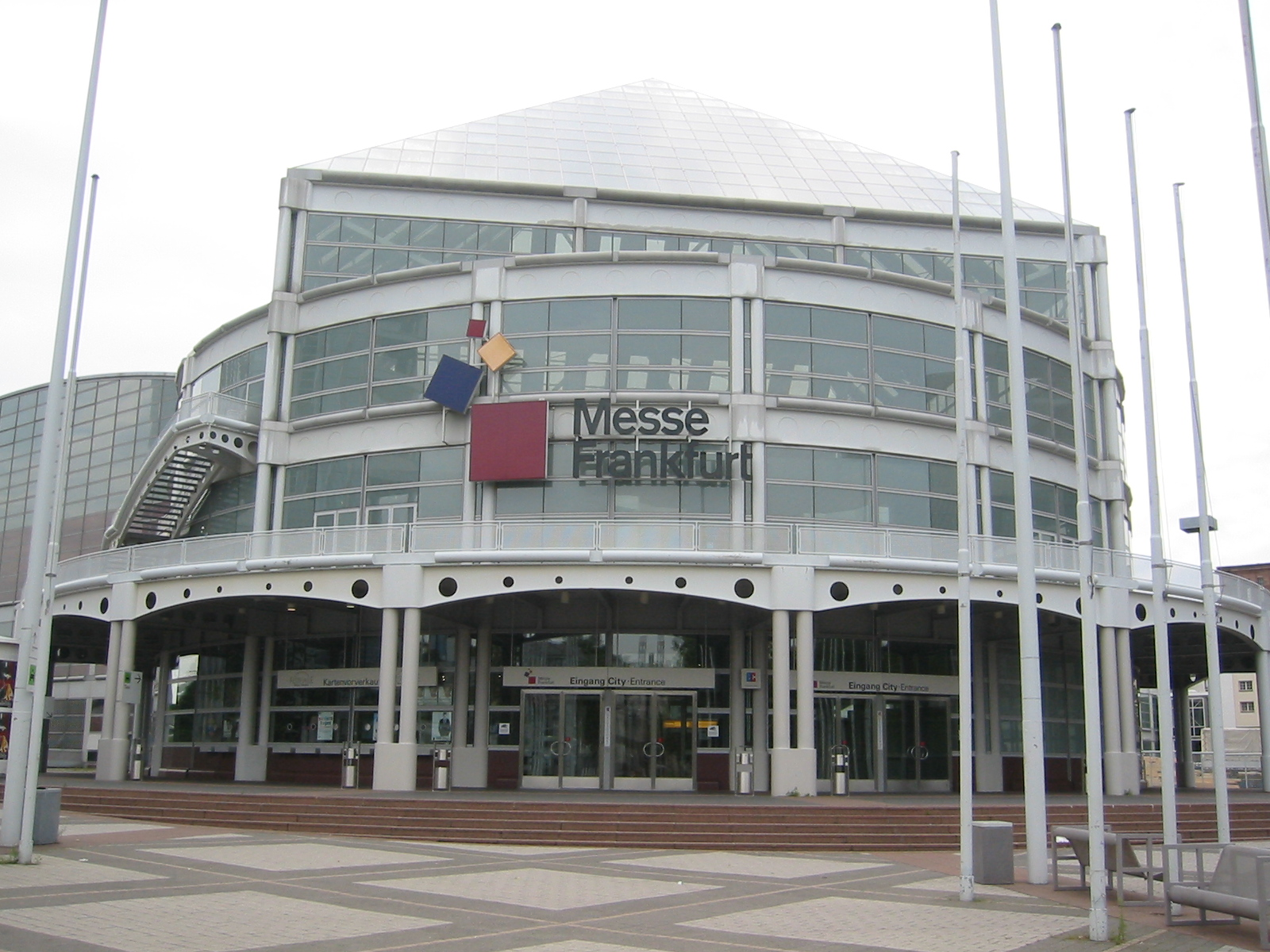
- Frankfurter Messe building in 2005
- Type: GmbH
- Industry: Trade fair
- Founded: 1907
- Founder: City of Frankfurt
- Headquarters: Frankfurt am Main, Germany
- Key people: Wolfgang Marzin (Chairman), Uwe Behm, Detlef Braun
- Revenue: 154 million Euro (2021)
- Number of employees: c. 2,500 (2022)
- Website: messefrankfurt.com

Messe Frankfurt or Frankfurter Messe (lit. 'Frankfurt Trade Fair') is one of the world's largest trade fair, congress and event organizer with its own exhibition grounds. The organization has 2,500 employees at some 30 locations, generating annual sales of around €661 million. Its services include renting exhibition grounds, trade fair construction and marketing, personnel and food services.

Headquartered in Frankfurt am Main, the company is owned by the City of Frankfurt (60 percent) and the federal state Hesse (40 percent). The Board of Management of Messe Frankfurt consists of Wolfgang Marzin (Chairman), Detlef Braun, and Uwe Behm.

== History ==
Frankfurt has been known for its trade fairs for over 800 years. In the Middle Ages, merchants and businessmen met at the "Römer", a medieval building in the heart of the city that served as a market place; from 1909 onwards, they met on the grounds of the Festhalle Frankfurt, to the north of Frankfurt Central Station. The first Frankfurt trade fair to be documented in writing dates back to 11 July 1240, when the Frankfurt Autumn Trade Fair was called into being by Emperor Frederick II, who decreed that merchants travelling to the fair were under his protection. Some ninety years later, on 25 April 1330, the Frankfurt Spring Fair also received its privilege from Emperor Louis IV. And from this time onwards, trade fairs were held in Frankfurt twice a year, in spring and autumn, forming the basic structure for Messe Frankfurt's modern consumer goods fairs.

== Trade fairs ==
In 2003 Frankfurt hosted a total of 24 trade fairs of international magnitude. These 24 international trade fairs included the International Motor Show Germany (IAA), and the Frankfurt Book Fair. That year, a total of 40,295 exhibitors presented their products in Frankfurt. In excess of 2.4 million visitors came to see and examine these products. In 2021, the IAA moved to Munich.

Messe Frankfurt hosts an annual consumer goods trade fair called Ambiente. Between 2012 and 2019, this fair included Partner Country Exhibitions and Design Ambassadorships. showcasing international design excellence.

Year	Partner Country	Design Ambassadors	Exhibitions
2012	Denmark	Danish Design Council	"Design Forecast Denmark"
2013	France	Olivia Putman	"La France un art de vivre"
		Olivier Gagnère	"Café Manufaktur" (cafe)
2014	Japan	Yukio Hashimoto	"Super Ennichi"
2015	United States	Scott Henderson	"Seashore Galore"
		Jason Miller	"Lifespace Lounge" (cafe)
2016	Italy	Paola Navone	"Dolce Vita"
		Paola Navone	"Milano Milano" (cafe)
		Giulio Lachetti	"Rimini Rimini" (cafe)
2017	United Kingdom	Janice Kirkpatrick	"Providence and Provenance"
		Bethan Gray	"Jade Serenity" (cafe)
2018	Netherlands	Robert Wim Bronwasser	"Do Dutch"
		Brechtje Troost	"Infinity" (cafe)
2019	India	Ayush Kasliwal	"Hande Make in India"
		Sandeep Sangaru	"Starry Night" (cafe)

== Frankfurt fairground ==
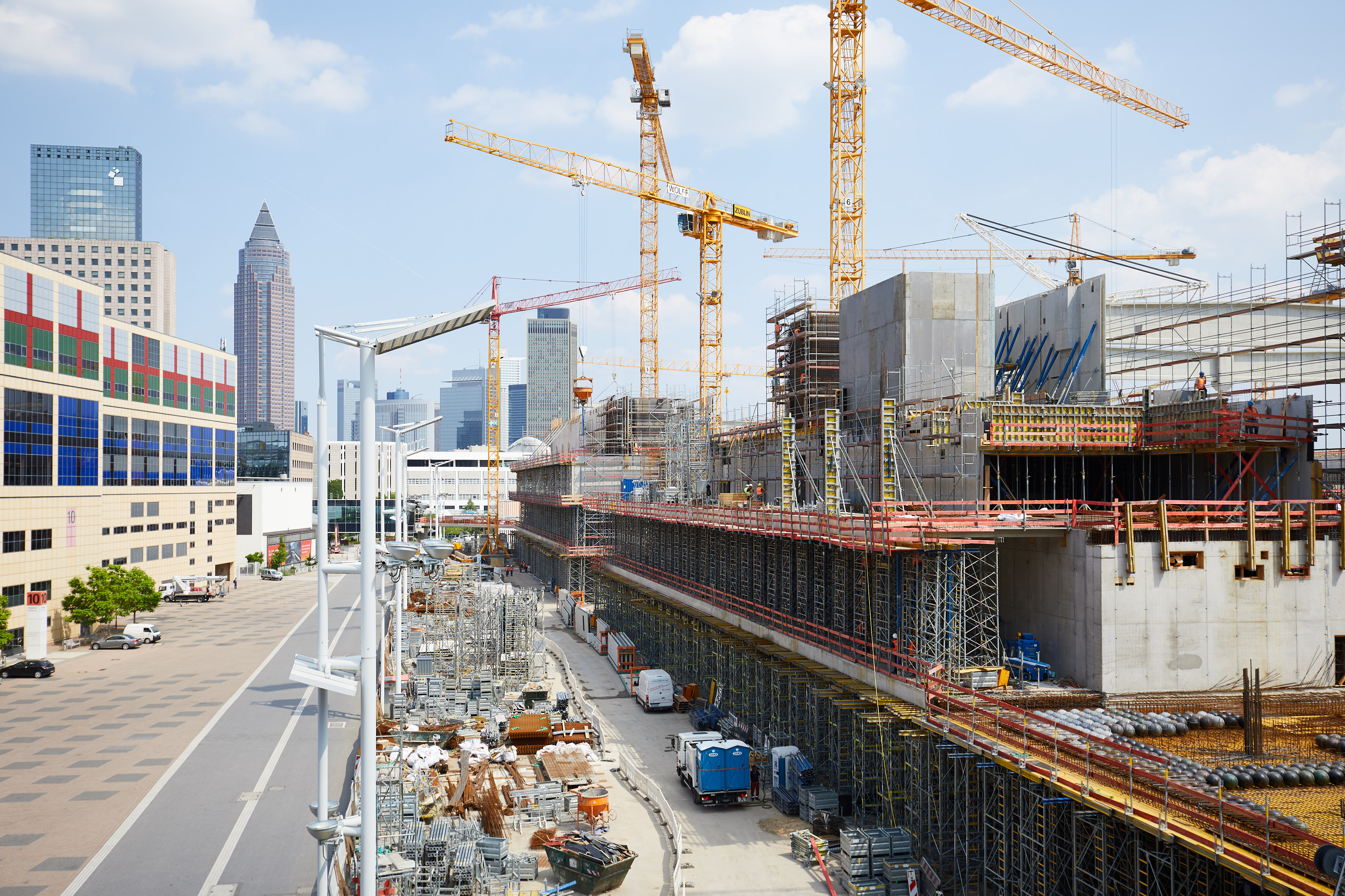
Hall 12 under construction in 2017

The Frankfurt fairground gives exhibitions the characteristics of a downtown trade fair with an urban backdrop. The expansion of the fairground building complex was completed in 2020.

=== Location and size ===
Located near the centre of Frankfurt, the exhibition grounds are among the largest and most modern worldwide with 372,350 m^{2} (4,007,900 sq ft) of hall area and more than 66,764 m^{2} (718,640 sq ft) of free space at its disposal.

=== Public transit ===
- air: Frankfurt Airport
- rail: Frankfurt (Main) Hauptbahnhof (On foot: 20 min)
- Rhine-Main S-Bahn: Frankfurt Messe station
- underground: Festhalle/Messe
- tram: 16 17 Festhalle/Messe

=== Architecture ===
Notable architects of the exhibition ground were Helmut Jahn (Messeturm), Oswald Mathias Ungers (Messe Torhaus) and Nicholas Grimshaw (Frankfurt Trade Fair Hall). The company operates two congress centres, the Congress Center and Kap Europa. Hall 12 is the newest and ultramodern hall. The new Hall 5 was completed in 2023 and connects the exhibition center with the Congress Center.

== Gallery ==
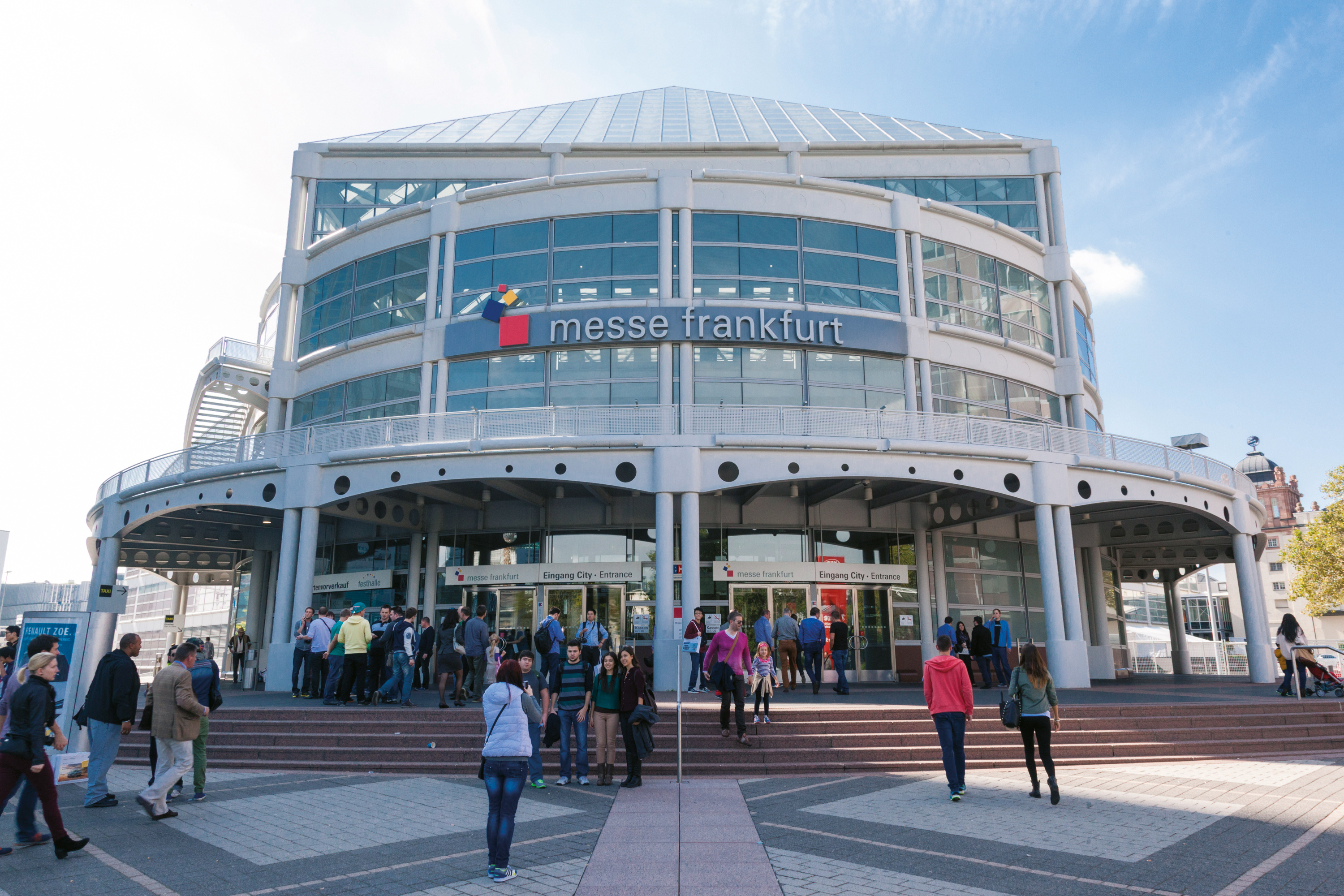
Messe Frankfurt – City Entrance

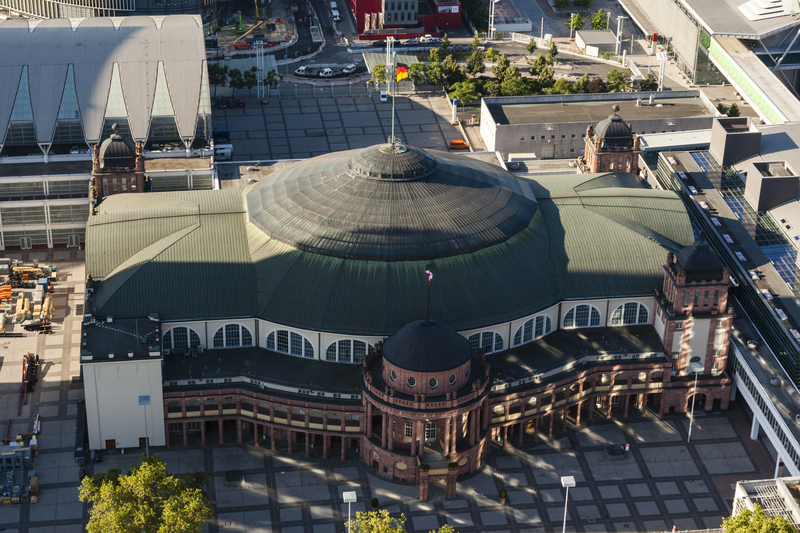
Festhalle Frankfurt

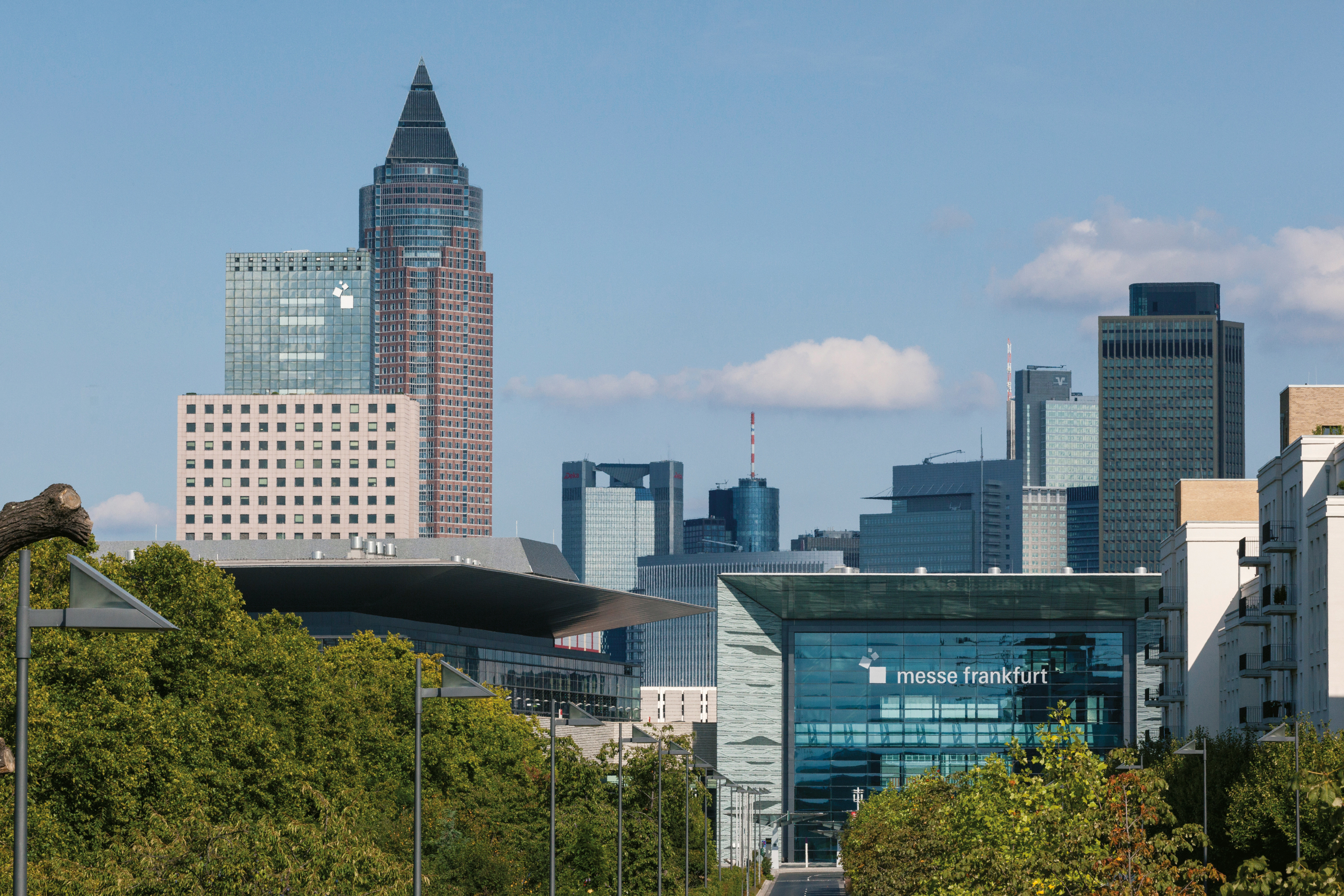
Hall 11 and Portalhaus

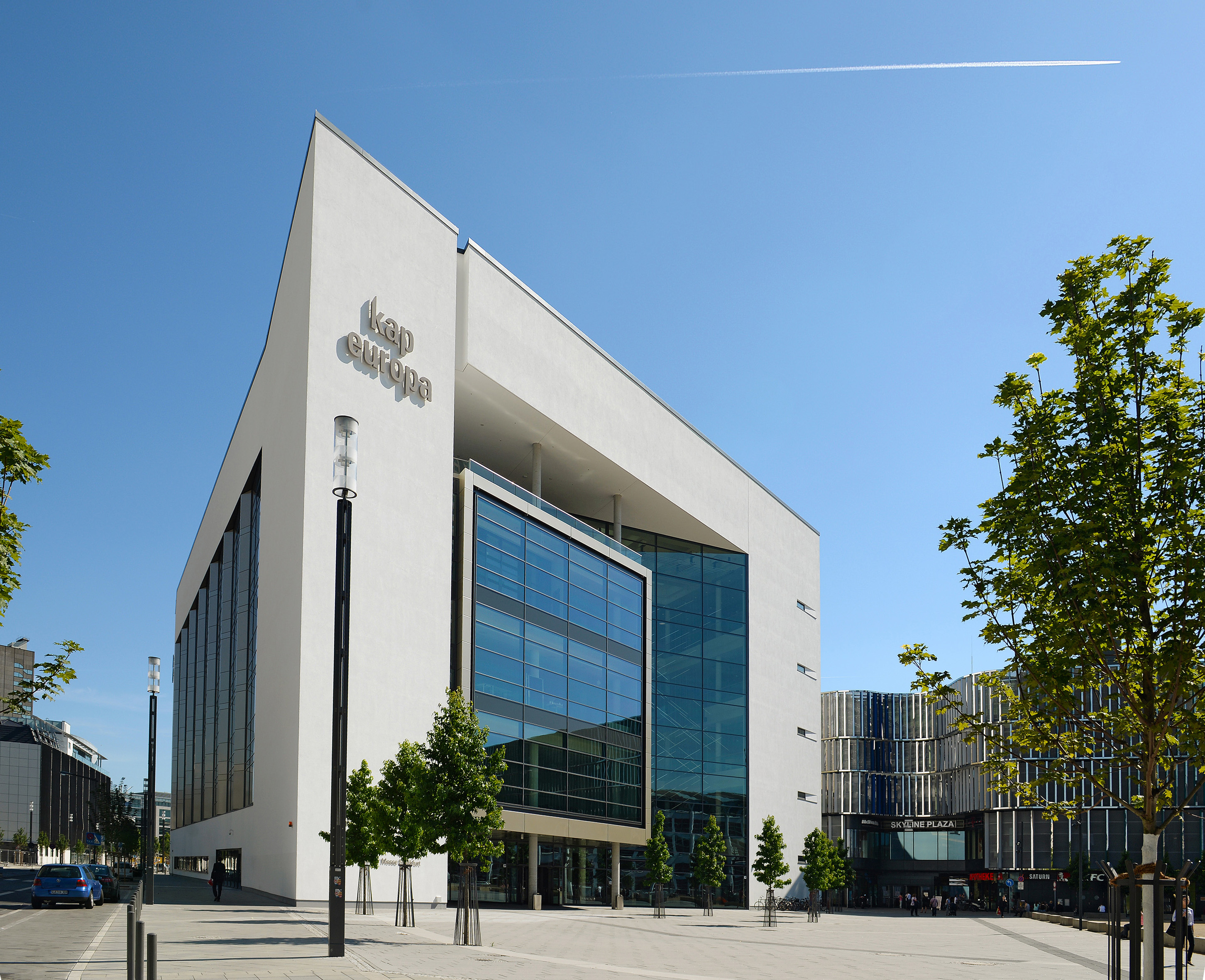
Congress Centre Kap Europa
