= Architectural icon =

Building with a unique design

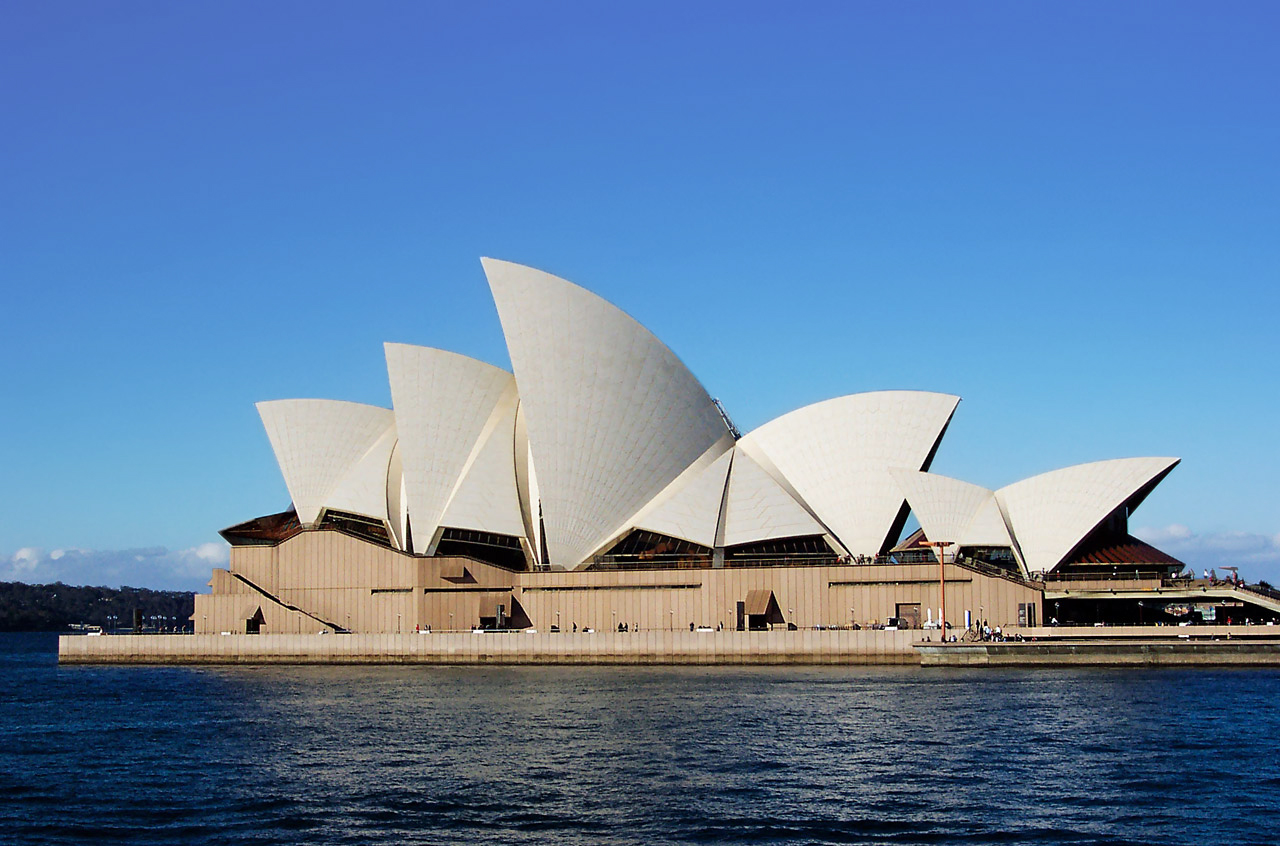
The Sydney Opera House counts among the world-famous architectural icons.

An architectural icon is a building considered to be groundbreaking, or to claim uniqueness because of its design.

== Definition ==
These outstanding buildings and ensembles meet several of the following criteria:

1. widespread recognition
2. popularity
3. originality
4. symbol value
5. significance for the development of architecture
6. representative of an architectural style

Sabine Thiel-Siling writes in her preface to Architectural icons of the 20th century: "The buildings are spectacular for their time and their surroundings, whether through their constructive achievements or innovative use of materials, through their formal language or because they embodied a completely new type of building for the first time."

Some buildings have developed into pilgrimage venues for architecture enthusiasts or have even become landmarks of cities, even countries. But they have often been misunderstood by laymen, even when they have become role models for entire generations of architects.

Tom Wright, the architect of Burj al Arab said on the same subject: "How can you tell that a building has become a symbol? If you can draw it in five seconds, and everyone knows what it is."

== Criticism ==
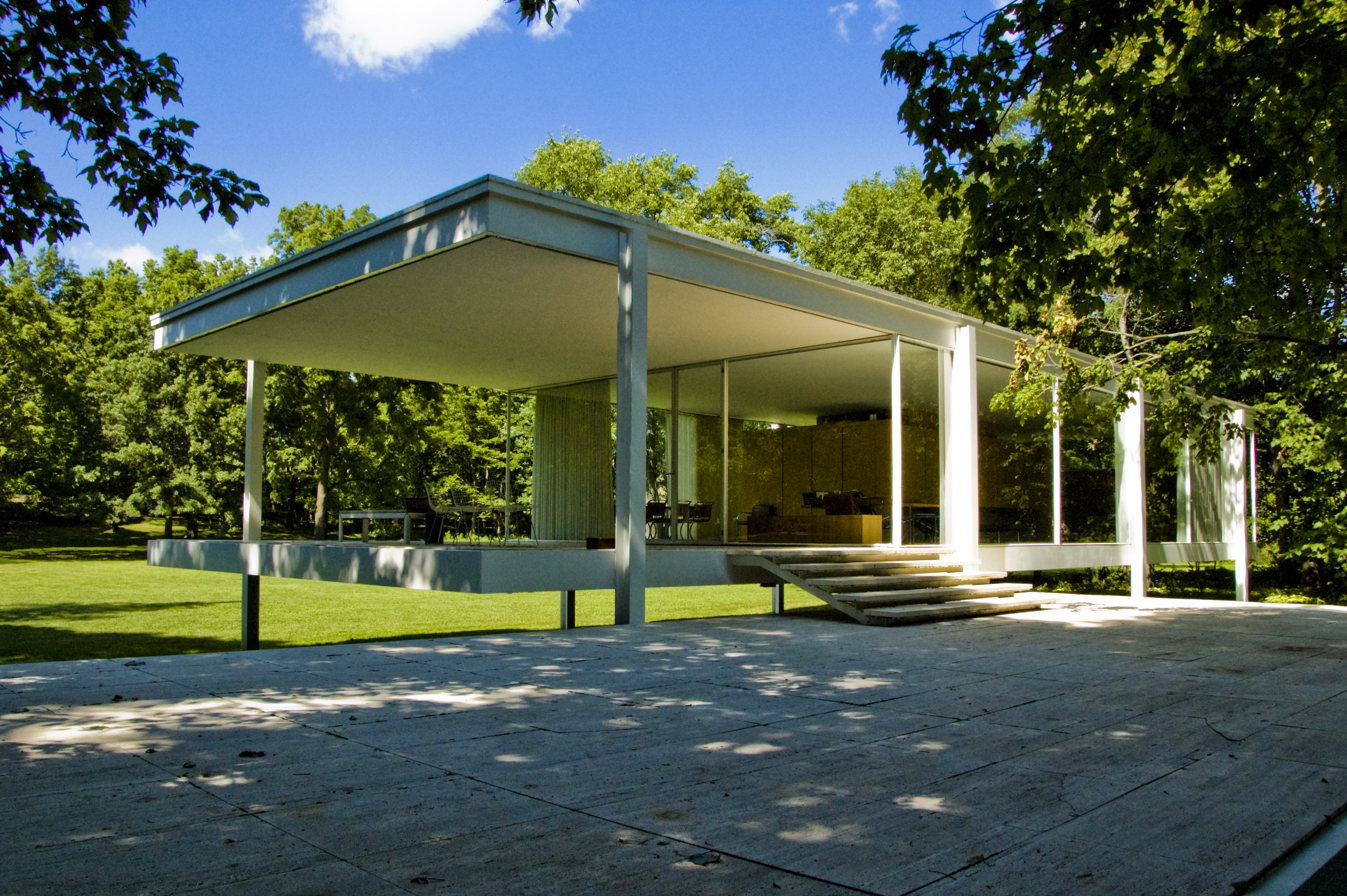
Farnsworth House

In order to achieve an abstract goal, architects often plan outside the needs of their clients. The Chicago physician Edith Farnsworth, who commissioned Ludwig Mies van der Rohe in 1945 to design a weekend house in which she could retreat for relaxation, was not impressed by the purism of her Farnsworth House, which cost her a lot of money, and expressed herself to the architect as follows: "I wanted something "meaningful," and all I got was this smooth, superficial sophistry" (in German: Ich wollte etwas „Bedeutungsvolles“ haben, und alles was ich bekam, war diese glatte, oberflächliche Sophisterei.)

And it was precisely this mansion that became a place of pilgrimage for architectural tourists. People LeBlanc writes about: "The architectural tourist is a courageous man who easily plans a whole journey to see a certain building; who looks for half a day to find it; who lingers for hours at the threshold, hoping to enter. But his tenacity is worth it, because to fully understand a building, you have to see it for yourself." (in German: "Der Architekturtourist ist ein beherzter Mensch, der ohne weiteres eine ganze Reise plant, um ein bestimmtes Bauwerk zu sehen; der einen halben Tag sucht, um es zu finden; der stundenlang an der Türschwelle herumlungert, in der Hoffnung, hineinzukommen. Doch seine Hartnäckigkeit lohnt sich, denn um ein Gebäude voll und ganz zu verstehen, muss man es selbst sehen".)

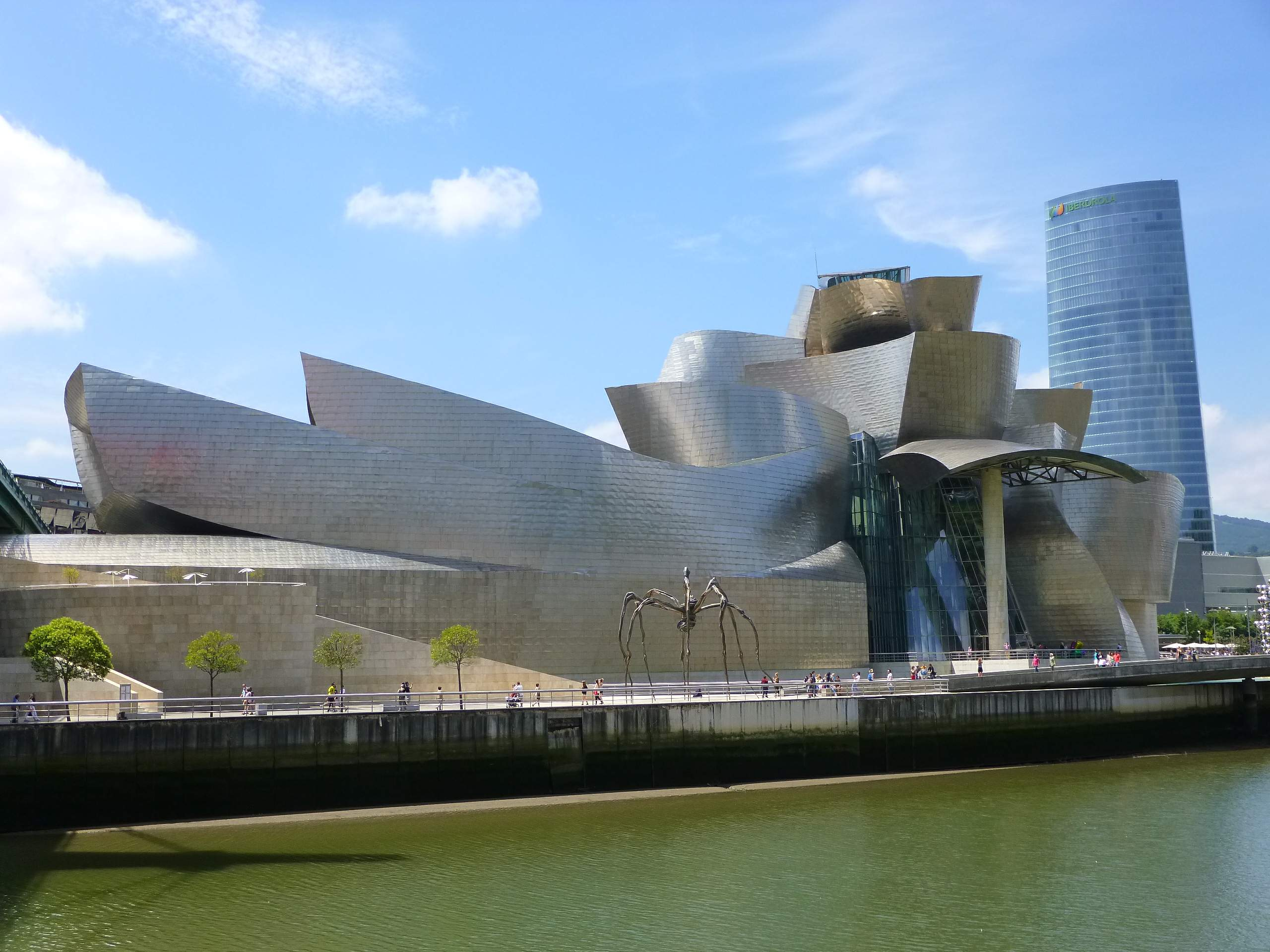
The Guggenheim Museum Bilbao

Jürgen Tietz, who in the Neuen Zürcher Zeitung critically examines the urge for ever new architectural symbols triggered by the so-called "Bilbao effect" of Frank O. Gehry's Guggenheim Museum in the Basque Bilbao, also takes up the fact that you have to see a building yourself. First this fashion wave reached the metropolises before it reached the smaller cities, because the more distinctive a building is, the better it can be marketed. Well-known buildings ensure that individual locations are immediately recognizable: The Eiffel Tower stands for Paris and the Parthenon for Athens.

In the times of globalization architectural icons are becoming trademarks in the competition between metropolises: "At the same time, the growing inflation on the catwalk of architectural images threatens to contribute to general confusion. Did this house stand in Hamburg, Tokyo or Paris? Was it the museum in Bern, Manchester or Seoul? Was it the architect Eisenman, Koolhaas or Piano?" (in German: Zugleich droht die wachsende Inflation auf dem Catwalk der Architekturbilder zur allgemeinen Verwirrung beizutragen. Stand dieses Haus in Hamburg, Tokio oder Paris? War es das Museum in Bern, Manchester oder Seoul? Hiess der Architekt Eisenman, Koolhaas oder Piano?) The dilemma of this architecture, which is oriented towards the visual effect, is that it must rely on the quick glance. Tietz calls it "an architectural fast food that is as easy to consume as possible" (in German: ein möglichst leicht konsumierbares architektonisches Fast Food). At the same time, it is often forgotten that what constitutes the quality of architecture can only be experienced on location: "But the Modernist building set is also constantly generating new images for worldwide marketing in the architectural circus: ecologically ambitious at Foster, elegantly expressive at Gehry, zigzag deconstructed at Libeskind. (in German: Doch auch der Baukasten der Moderne generiert laufend neue Bilder für die weltweite Vermarktung im Architekturzirkus: ökologisch ambitioniert bei Foster, elegant expressiv bei Gehry, zackig dekonstruiert bei Libeskind.)

However, these computer-designed, constructed marketing strategies threaten, according to Tietz, to turn architecture into a cliché that is full of Potemkin villages.

== Some examples ==
An example of this is the Seagram Building in New York, which became the icon of the modern skyscraper and in the following decades the most imitated example of its kind worldwide. The construction of the Sydney Opera House was part of a rethinking of 1950s architecture.

As icons of a place or a time, today one rather erects buildings like the opera house in Sydney or the Guggenheim Museum in Bilbao. However, they have a similar function as the colossal statues and shape the image of the respective city internationally.

— Andres Lepik, Skysraper

== List (selection) ==
This list can never be complete, but it should give an overview of the diversity of building.

Picture	Name / Year	Architect	Place	Notes
	Parthenon; 5th century BC		Athens, Greece	Classical Greek temple, famous since its construction for its harmonious proportions, considered by many to be the "summit of all architecture" and a perfect expression of humanity.
	Pantheon; 119/125		Rome, Italy	The Pantheon, completed under Emperor Hadrian, had the largest dome in the world for more than 1700 years, measured by its inner diameter, and is generally regarded as the best preserved building of Roman antiquity.
	Hagia Sophia; 537		Istanbul, Turkey	Hagia Sophia, built as a domed basilica, set new architectural accents in the 6th century. The significance of the dome in terms of architectural history lies not in its size, but rather in the fact that for the first time it rests on only four pillars and hovers above the room below.
	Chartres Cathedral; 1260		Chartres, France	Chartres Cathedral is the meeting place of many art and cultural historical currents. At the beginning of the classical phase of Gothic architecture, there were two fundamentally different approaches, of which only one was successful and which has become much better known.
	Villa Capra "La Rotonda"; 1571	Andrea Palladio	Vicenza, Italy	Ideal Renaissance building whose aesthetics sought to match those of ancient models. Thomas Jefferson anonymously submitted a plan to the competition for the design of the presidential residence in Washington D.C., which was a variation of the Villa Rotonda. This design was not accepted, but he picked up elements for his own home in Monticello.
	The Crystal Palace; 1851	Joseph Paxton	London, United Kingdom	Prefabricated building based on serially manufactured modular components. To showcase the construction so consciously with representative architecture was a novelty.
	Sagrada Família; 1882	Antoni Gaudí	Barcelona, Spain	The Sagrada Família is an unusual work of sacral architecture that reinterprets Gothic motifs with modern means.
	Eiffel Tower; 1889	Gustave Eiffel	Paris, France	For 41 years since its erection, the wrought iron framework has been the world's tallest structure, triggering a worldwide wave of tower construction. The outstanding architectural position is based on the one hand on the many buildings that followed the construction principle, some of which even copied the appearance, and on the other hand the tower was built completely without any historical model.
	Rietveld Schröder House; 1924	Gerrit Rietveld	Utrecht, Netherlands	The building is one of the most important buildings of the De Stijl movement.
	Chilehaus; 1924	Fritz Höger	Hamburg, Germany	The Chilehaus was exemplary for the brick expressionism of the 1920s. With its ship's bow-like tip, it became an icon of Expressionism in architecture.
	Einstein Tower; 1924	Erich Mendelsohn	Potsdam, Germany	The observatory in the Albert Einstein Science Park on the Telegraphenberg in Potsdam is a revolutionary building for its time of origin.
	Hufeisensiedlung; 1925–1930	Bruno Taut	Berlin, Germany	The Hufeisensiedlung, to which the holiday home "Tautes Heim" belongs, is internationally regarded as a key work of reform-oriented urban housing construction.
	Bauhaus Dessau; 1926	Walter Gropius	Dessau, Germany	Apart from the then novel functional separation by individual structures joined together to form an organism, the special feature is the wall of the workshop wing, which is completely dissolved in glass.
	Barcelona Pavilion; 1929	Ludwig Mies van der Rohe	Barcelona, Spain	The building, which became a style-setter for modern architecture, realized two design principles of van der Rohe: Free plan and "Floating roof".
	Villa Tugendhat; 1930	Ludwig Mies van der Rohe	Brno, Czech Republic	Construction and wall were strictly separated from each other and should allow a "freely" divisible floor plan.
	Fallingwater; 1937	Frank Lloyd Wright	near Pittsburgh, Pennsylvania, United States	The client wanted a building with a view of the waterfall. After an accurate survey of the site, which included all trees and rocks, Wright suggested that the building be built over the waterfall.
	Glass House; 1949	Philip Johnson	New Canaan, Connecticut, United States	The Glass House is characterised by a radical reduction of the exterior walls.
	Farnsworth House; 1951	Ludwig Mies van der Rohe	Plano Illinois, United States	The exterior walls are completely made of glass and allow a direct connection to nature in every situation, only light curtains are provided for privacy.
	Notre Dame du Haut; 1955	Le Corbusier	Ronchamp, France	Due to its organic shape, the church is also a place of pilgrimage for architects and art lovers.
	Solomon R. Guggenheim Museum; 1959	Frank Lloyd Wright	New York City, New York, United States	Wright created a winding ramp and an elevator that transports visitors to the highest point of the ramp so they can walk down past the artworks.
	Berliner Philharmonie; 1963	Hans Scharoun	Berlin, Germany	The architecture largely removes the separation between artist and audience, the artists sit "in the midst" of the audience.
	Montreal Biosphere; 1967	Richard Buckminster Fuller	Montreal, Canada	The US pavilion at Expo 67 in Montreal is made of steel and acrylic and was the model for numerous subsequent buildings.
	Cathedral of Brasília; 1970	Oscar Niemeyer	Brasília, Brazil	The cathedral and parliament building characterise the newly built Brazilian capital.
	Finlandia Hall; 1971	Alvar Aalto	Helsinki, Finland	The architectural style is functionally oriented and offers a vivid contrast to the often melancholic landscape.
	Olympiastadion Munich; 1972	Günter Behnisch	Munich, Germany	The Olympiapark architectural group designed a stadium that is embedded in the landscape. The Olympic Stadium became the symbol of a new lightness of German post-war architecture.
	Sydney Opera House; 1973	Jørn Utzon	Sydney, Australia	The Sydney Opera House is a popular tourist attraction, landmark of Sydney and Australia. Denmark also sees the Opera House today as part of its cultural heritage.
	Centre Georges Pompidou; 1977	Renzo Piano, Richard Rogers and Gianfranco Franchini	Paris, France	The supporting structure and pipes for building services engineering and development were visibly arranged on the outside of the building. Significant step towards modern architecture and postmodern architecture.
	Louvre Pyramid; 1989	Ieoh Ming Pei	Paris, France	The pyramid consists of 602 rhombic and 69 triangular glass segments. The Great Pyramid of Giza served as a model for the proportions.
	Fire station 1993	Zaha Hadid	Weil am Rhein, Germany	The structure consists of clearly cut serrations and edges in a pane construction.
	Oriental Pearl Tower; 1995	Jia Huancheng	Shanghai, China	Its unique construction of eleven spheres of different sizes at different heights, supported by columns, has become one of the most famous landmarks of the city of Shanghai.
	Therme Vals; 1996	Peter Zumthor	Vals, Switzerland	The spa is reminiscent of a quarry from which cuboids were cut out. The remaining blocks and the cavities between them form the entire building.
	Niterói Contemporary Art Museum; 1996	Oscar Niemeyer	Niterói, Brazil	The Niterói Contemporary Art Museum has a diameter of 50 m and reminds with its form of the foot of an atomic mushroom or of a UFO.
	Guggenheim Museum Bilbao; 1997	Frank Gehry	Bilbao, Spain	The very bizarre building is famous for its deconstructivist architectural style. But the museum building also stands for economic success, see Bilbao Effect.
	Burj al Arab; 1999	Tom Wright	Dubai, United Arab Emirates	The client wanted a landmark for Dubai, which the architect implemented with the help of a memorable form. Within very short time, the luxury hotel in the form of a yacht sail became Dubai's identification mark.
	Beijing National Stadium; 2008	Herzog & de Meuron	Beijing, China	Due to its shape, the stadium has the nickname "bird's nest". The architect Jacques Herzog hopes that "this building will become for Beijing what the Eiffel Tower is for Paris".
	Burj Khalifa; 2010	Adrian Smith	Dubai, United Arab Emirates	Since 2008, the Burj Khalifa is the tallest building in the world. The investors kept the height secret until the opening on 4 January 2010. With the Burj Khalifa, the various categories of records of the tallest building will be awarded to a single building for the first time since the Empire State Building was erected in 1931.
	Metropol Parasol; 2011	Jürgen Mayer	Sevilla, Spain	The new landmark of Seville has a length of 150 meters, a width of 70 meters and a height of 26 meters and is considered the largest wooden construction in the world.

== See also ==
- World Architecture Survey
