= Skulpturen Park Köln =

Public park with sculptures in Cologne, Germany

Coordinates: 50°57′20.80″N 06°58′15.50″E

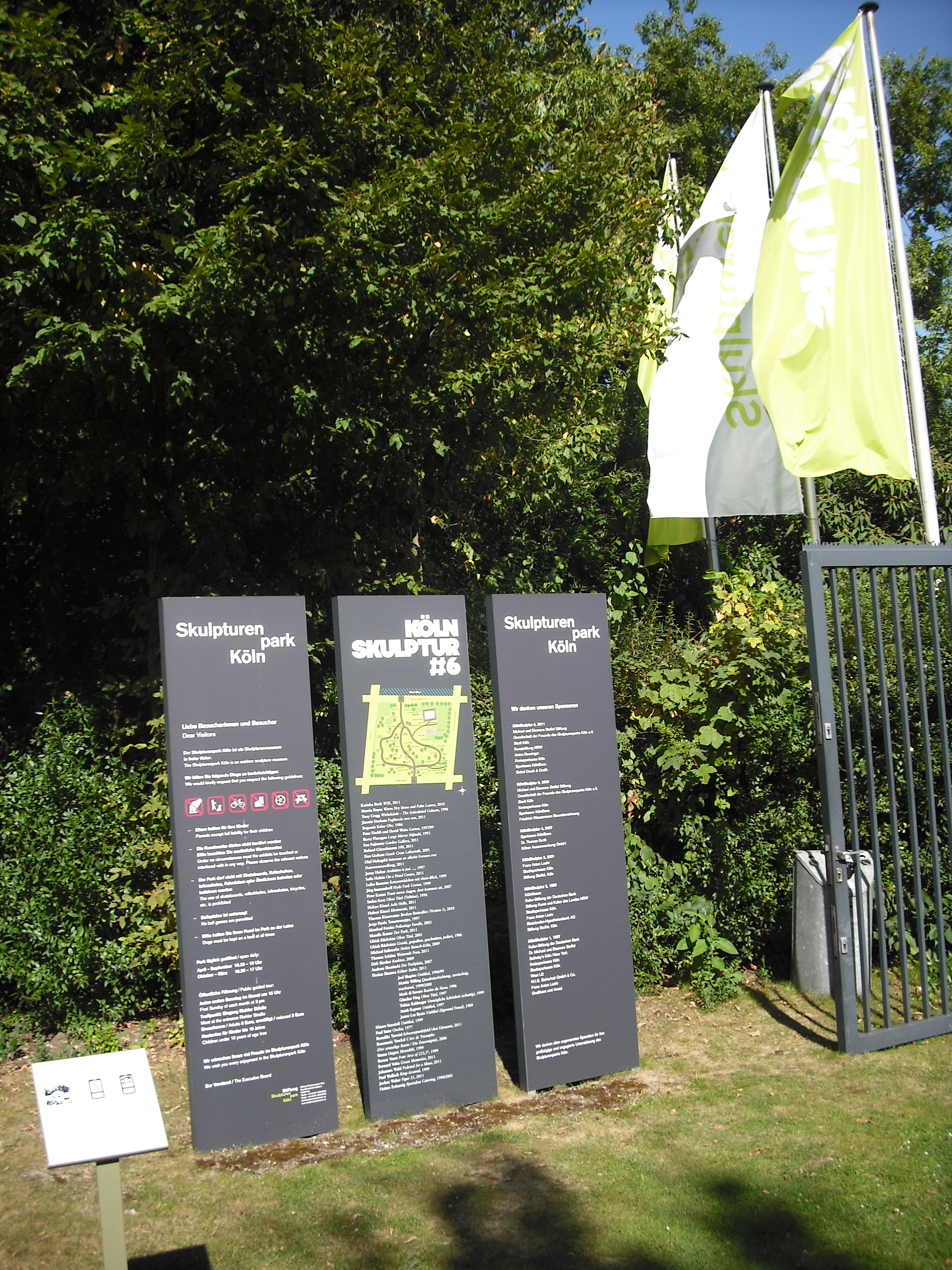
Entrance to the park, 2012

Skulpturen Park Köln

Skulpturen Park Köln (Cologne Sculpture Park) is a major international overview of contemporary sculpture which has been on display to the public, in a series of two-year exhibitions, in Cologne, Germany, since 1997.

== History ==
The 25,000-square-foot (2,300 m^{2}) public park features works by German and international artists. It is described as a "place for the exploration of contemporary sculpture". There is no permanent collection but instead, every two years, some of the exhibits are replaced. The garden is operated privately in cooperation with the City of Cologne.

The park was initiated by Cologne art collector Dr. Michael Stoffel, who founded the Society of Friends of Cologne Sculpture Park. Following the death of Stoffel in 2005, his wife, Eleonore, took over as Director until her death in April 2007. On the initiative of the Michael and Eleonore Stoffel Foundation (MES) the Foundation Cologne Sculpture Park was established in 2008 and has now taken over the management of the park. It is thanks to the board of the MES, that the sculptures in the park are on permanent loan from the Pinakothek der Moderne in Munich.

In 1997 the park, with mature trees, already existed as a derelict green space in front of Cologne Zoo, between Zoobrücke and the Rhine. Its conversion to a sculpture park saw the site as a new development on Riehler Strasse, diagonally across from the zoo. The park has a second entrance from Konrad-Adenauer-Ufer. There are car parking spaces located under the zoo bridge and the park lounge offers drinks and snacks to visitors.

The park is open daily (April - September: 10.30 - 19.00; October - March: 10.30 - 17.00) and admission is free. On the first Sunday of the month at 15.00, a guided tour is available for a small fee. There is an innovative Mobile Art Guide available via smartphone with exhibit labels coded accordingly.

== Exhibitions ==
KölnSkulptur 1 (1 Nov 1998 - 1 Sep 1999)

- Magdalena Abakanowicz
- Louise Bourgeois
- Alexander Calder
- Sir Anthony Caro
- Tony Cragg
- Barry Flanagan
- Günther Förg
- Jenny Holzer
- Ellsworth Kelly
- Stefan Kern
- Hubert Kiecol
- Martin Kippenberger
- Per Kirkeby
- Yves Klein
- Alf Lechner
- Markus Lüpertz
- Paul Myoda
- Barnett Newman
- Ansgar Nierhoff
- Jorge Pardo
- A. R. Penck
- George Rickey
- Giuseppe Spagnulo
- Rosemarie Trockel
- Bernar Venet
- Franz West

KölnSkulptur 2 (15 Nov 2000 - 1 Sep 2001

- Stephan Balkenhol
- Tony Cragg
- Bogomir Ecker
- Peter Fischli & David Weiss
- Günther Förg
- Isa Genzken
- Asta Gröting
- Georg Herold
- Jenny Holzer
- Leiko Ikemura
- Jörg Immendorff
- Anish Kapoor
- Stefan Kern
- Meuser
- Jorge Pardo
- Tobias Rehberger
- Ursula von Rydingsvard
- Julian Schnabel
- Joel Shapiro
- David Smith
- Mauro Staccioli
- Frank Stella
- Mark di Suvero
- Rosemarie Trockel
- Simon Ungers
- Paul Wallach
- Franz West
- Martin Willing

KölnSkulptur 3 (1 Oct 2001 - 1 Sep 2003)

- Stephan Balkenhol
- Bonnie Collura
- Tony Cragg
- Bogomir Ecker
- Peter Fischli & David Weiss
- Barry Flanagan
- Günther Förg
- Karl Gerstner
- Dan Graham
- Jenny Holzer
- Martin Honert
- Leiko Ikemura
- Jörg Immendorff
- Anish Kapoor
- Stefan Kern
- Jorge Pardo
- Tobias Rehberger
- Ulrich Rückriem
- Joel Shapiro
- Mauro Staccioli
- Mark di Suvero
- Rosemarie Trockel
- Simon Ungers
- Bernar Venet
- Paul Wallach
- Franz West
- Martin Willing
- Johannes Wohnseifer
- Heimo Zobernig

KölnSkulptur 4 (1 Apr 2007 - 1 Apr 2009)

- James Lee Byars
- Bonnie Collura
- George Condo
- Tony Cragg
- Bogomir Ecker
- Peter Fischli / David Weiss
- Barry Flanagan
- Günther Förg
- Dan Graham
- Jenny Holzer
- Leiko Ikemura
- Jörg Immendorff
- Anish Kapoor
- Stefan Kern
- Markus Lüpertz
- Tatzu Nishi
- Kirsten Ortwed
- Jorge Pardo
- Manfred Pernice
- Tal R
- Tobias Rehberger
- Ulrich Rückriem
- Thomas Scheibitz
- Joel Shapiro
- Andreas Slominski
- Mauro Staccioli
- Mark di Suvero
- Rosemarie Trockel
- Simon Ungers
- Bernar Venet
- Paul Wallach
- Franz West
- Martin Willing
- Heimo Zobernig

KölnSkulptur 5 (18 Apr 2009 - 1 Apr 2011)

- James Lee Byars
- Tony Cragg
- Aaron Curry
- Christina Doll
- Bogomir Ecker
- Alexander Esters
- Peter Fischli / David Weiss
- Barry Flanagan
- Katharina Fritsch
- Dan Graham
- Jenny Holzer
- Leiko Ikemura
- Jörg Immendorff
- Anish Kapoor
- Bernd Kastner
- Stefan Kern
- Norbert Kricke
- Jonathan Meese
- Isa Melsheimer
- Thomas Moecker
- Jorge Pardo
- Manfred Pernice
- Tobias Rehberger
- Thomas Rentmeister
- Ulrich Rückriem
- Michael Sailstorfer
- Jan Philip Scheibe
- Joel Shapiro
- Dirk Skreber
- Torsten Slama
- Andreas Slominski
- Alan Sonfist
- Mauro Staccioli
- Thomas Stimm
- Mark di Suvero
- Rosemarie Trockel
- Bernar Venet
- Paul Wallach
- Ina Weber
- Franz West
- Martin Willing
- Heimo Zobernig

KölnSkulptur 6 (15 May 2011 - 1 May 2013)

- Katinka Bock
- Martin Boyce
- James Lee Byars
- Bonnie Collura
- Tony Cragg
- Jimmie Durham
- Bogomir Ecker
- Peter Fischli / David Weiss
- Barry Flanagan
- Günther Förg
- Sou Fujimoto
- Dan Graham
- Roland Gätzschmann
- Olaf Holzapfel
- Jenny Holzer
- Sofia Hultén
- Leiko Ikemura
- Jörg Immendorff
- Anish Kapoor
- Stefan Kern
- Hubert Kiecol
- Thomas Kiesewetter
- Jorge Pardo
- Manfred Pernice
- Tobias Rehberger
- Mandla Reuter
- Ulrich Rückriem
- Michael Sailstorfer
- Thomas Schütte
- Joel Shapiro
- Dirk Skreber
- Torsten Slama
- Andreas Slominski
- Florian Slotawa
- Mauro Staccioli
- Paul Suter
- Mark di Suvero
- Benedikt Terwiel
- Rosemarie Trockel
- Bernar Venet
- Bernard Voïta
- Johannes Wald
- Paul Wallach
- Jochen Weber
- Martin Willing
- Heimo Zobernig

== Exhibits ==
This park has presented contemporary sculptures by internationally established artists, in a series of two year exhibitions, since 1997.

== Sources ==
A catalogue was published, by the "Gesellschaft der Freunde des Skulpturenparks Köln e.V.", for:

- KölnSkulptur 1, Published by Wienand Verlag, Cologne
- KölnSkulptur 2, Published by Wienand Verlag, Cologne
- KölnSkulptur 3, Published by Wienand Verlag, Cologne
- KölnSkulptur 4, by Verlag der Buchhandlung Walther König, Cologne ISBN 978-3-86560-213-8
