= Blue (sculpture) =

Painted aluminum sculpture

- Artist: Joel Shapiro
- Completion date: 2019
- Medium: Aluminum sculpture
- Owner: David Rubenstein

Blue is a 27-foot-tall 2019 aluminum sculpture by the American artist Joel Shapiro (1941–2025), which was removed on September 2, 2026, from the grounds of the Kennedy Center in Washington D.C. where it had stood for a number of years. It was removed by the National Park Service under the aegis of U.S. President Donald J. Trump.

The work stood at the Kennedy Center for seven years before being taken down. The work has been described as "sticklike". Tom Healy writing for The Atlantic described it as "...Boxy and rigid but seemingly weightless, Blue looked like a clumsy person who’d been swept by a breeze into an accidental pirouette."

The sculpture was subsequently purchased by the billionaire former chairman of the Kennedy Center, David Rubenstein, who was removed by Trump in 2025, for a reputed $2 million US, from the Joel Shapiro / Ellen Phelan foundation with the intent of it eventually being displayed at the National Gallery of Art, also in the District of Columbia.
