= Stele (disambiguation) =

A stele (plural steles or stelai) is a stone or wooden slab, generally taller than it is wide, erected as a monument, very often for funerary or commemorative purposes.

Stele may also refer to:

== Stele monuments ==
- See the list at Stele
- Stele Forest, a museum for steles in Xi'an, China

== People with the surname ==
- Veronica Stele (born 1977), Argentine tennis player

== Other uses ==
- Stele (biology), in a vascular plant, the central part of the root or stem
- Stele (Kurtág), a composition for orchestra by Hungarian composer György Kurtág (1994)
- Stele II, an abstract sculpture (1973) by Ellsworth Kelly
