= House series (Lichtenstein) =

Sculpture series by Roy Lichtenstein

The House series was produced by Roy Lichtenstein in the late 1990s and consists of several large-scale outdoor sculptures and an interior wall piece. The House series includes three distinct works: House I, House II, and House III. Each piece depicts the exterior of a simplified cartoon house, while actively producing an optical illusion. Houses I and III are available for display at the National Gallery of Art Sculpture Garden in Washington, D.C., and the High Museum of Art in Atlanta, GA, respectively. No records indicate the current location of House II.

== Context ==
=== Departure from C-Project ===
Immediately prior to his modeling of House I, the inaugural member of the House series, Lichtenstein served as a hologram plate designer for the C-Project (1994–1999), an international collaboration between renowned contemporary artists and hologram engineers. In May 1996, after creating a foam core model intended for a hologram of a domestic interior, Lichtenstein was unsatisfied with the results of his work, and he decided to leave the C-Project. Following his departure, Lichtenstein began to design the maquettes that would eventually become the House series.

=== Role in ongoing exploration of illusion ===
As touched upon above, the House sculptures actively employ optical illusion. Specifically, Lichtenstein's exploration of perspective in the House series reflects the principles of illusion discussed in the guidebook Drawing by Seeing, written by Hoyt L. Sherman, former professor at the Ohio State University School of Fine Arts.

In the context of its predecessors, the House series can be understood as a novel point in Lichtenstein's evolving exploration of illusion. After developing an interest in illusion as a student of Sherman's at Ohio State, Lichtenstein engaged with illusion and perspective in a range of media and scales over the course of his professional career, progressing from paintings to small-scale sculptures and finally, to large-scale sculptures in House. Lichtenstein initiated his investigation of optical illusion as he used Ben-day dots to create overlapping planes in his paintings Man With Folded Arms (1962) and Magnifying Glass (1963), and he progressed his exploration of perspective to small-scale sculptures in the 1970s and '80s as he created the illusion of three-dimensionality in the thin, single-plane sculptures of Goldfish Bowl (1977) and Sleeping Muse (1983). Considering these previous works, Lichtenstein's production of House on massive sculptural media indicated a novel stage in the progressive scaling-up of his artistic exploration of illusion.

== Design and illusion ==
=== Composition and structure ===
Although their raw sizes vary, each House piece is similar in its dimensions, image, coloration, and structure.

House I and House III both have approximate height to width to depth ratios of 2:3:1. Data about the dimensions of House II were unavailable.

All of the House sculptures display a simplified cartoon-style house exterior, each including windows, doors, a roof, and a chimney. Lichtenstein incorporated many hallmark elements of his pop art style into the House series. These stylistic elements included his exclusive use of bold primary colors—blue, red, yellow, black, and white—in the bodies of the houses and his sharp black lining of the edges of the sculptures.

Structurally, House I and House III—both of which are free-standing sculptures intended for outdoor display—are essentially identical. Each sculpture consists of two aluminum plates connected at their endpoints to create an obtuse angle projecting toward or away from the viewer, depending on the side from which an individual views the piece. In contrast, House II—due to its function as an interior wall decoration—is a compressed single plane structure that lies flat upon the wall on which it is mounted.

=== Optical illusion ===
As touched upon previously, the House series represents a late point in the progression of Lichtenstein's exploration of perspective to larger and more tangible media. In addition to advancing his medium for depicting optical illusion, Lichtenstein employed novel forms of optical illusion in House. In House, rather than create the illusions of several planes or dimensions, as he did in Man With Folded Arms (1962) and Goldfish Bowl (1977), Lichtenstein transforms the viewer perspective of an existing third dimension. Specifically, the House pieces play with the viewer's understanding of the three-dimensional directionality of the rectangular constituents of each sculpture. Based upon the thick black outlines running along each sculpture's base and corners, the corner of the house that appears to project towards the viewer actually recedes away from them.

== Materials and production ==
As mentioned above, Houses I and III are composed of painted aluminum plates. In contrast, due to the function of House II as a mounted interior wall piece, it is made of painted fiberglass.

Neither Lichtenstein nor scholars of the House series provide explicit descriptions of the paints used to create the House sculptures. However, a 2015 peer-reviewed record of the restoration of a second edition of House I, which is identical to the original House I and included in the Roy Lichtenstein Foundation's catalogue of the artist's works, details the paints of this edition. In addition, the painting techniques outlined in this record corroborate evidence from other articles about Lichtenstein's painting process for outdoor sculptures.

According to Lew and Choi (2015), before recent restoration programs, the second edition of House I held at the Leeum, Samsung Museum of Art in South Korea originally consisted of the industrial automobile paints Awlgrip and Imron. The painters of this edition of House I used Awlgrip for the roof of the house and Imron for the body of the house. Additionally, an account from an employee of the J. Paul Getty Museum who was involved in the restoration of Lichtenstein's outdoor sculpture Three Brushstrokes (1984) cites Lichtenstein's usage of automobile paints for the large-scale outdoor sculpture.

In the absence of official records about the paints used for the original House pieces, it is impossible to make a definitive conclusion about the constituent paints of the House sculptures. However, based upon the accounts of automobile paints being used for a replica of House I and Three Brushstrokes (1984), Lichtenstein likely relied upon similar automobile paints to create the original members of the House series.

== Installations ==
=== House I ===
House I was one of seventeen post-World War II sculptures originally included in the National Gallery of Art Sculpture Garden at the time of the garden's opening in May 1999. House I was gifted to the National Gallery of Art Sculpture Garden by the Morris and Gwendolyn Cafritz Foundation. The sculpture has remained at the garden since its original installation.

A second edition of House I, as described above, has resided at the Leeum, Samsung Museum of Art in Seoul, South Korea since 2005.

=== House II ===
As House II functions as a flat mounted wall piece as opposed to a free-standing sculpture, it has moved to different locations upon several occasions. According to a 1999 New York Times article about a Roy Lichtenstein sculpture exhibition at the Corcoran Gallery of Art, House II was first seen at the 1997 Venice Biennale. The sculpture was then included in the above exhibition at the Corcoran in 1999. Most recently, House II was shown at a 2008 Roy Lichtenstein sculpture exhibition at the Fairchild Tropical Botanic Garden in Miami, Florida.

=== House III ===
House III was purchased from the Roy Lichtenstein Foundation and installed outside of the High Museum of Art upon a public lawn in 2005. The installation of House III outside of the High Museum was part of a broad plan to expand the High into two new galleries and a piazza, both of which opened in November 2005. Outside of the High, House III is set upon an approximately one foot tall berm, which according to Jack Cowart, the founding executive director of the Roy Lichtenstein Foundation, magnifies the sculpture's "inverted perception."

The only other existing copy of House III is found at the estate of Dorothy Lichtenstein, Roy's wife, in Southampton, New York.

== Restoration and conservation ==
In terms of maintaining their original composition and coloration, the outdoor members of the House series confront the challenges of potential damage from both their surrounding environment—via heat, UV radiation, rain, snow, etc.—and their physical interactions with viewers. Since House I and House III are composed of aluminum, the potential degradation of their paint presents the dangerous possibility of exposing the sculptures' metal interiors to long-term erosion.

Due to the dangers of paint chalking and subsequent aluminum erosion, the National Gallery of Art Sculpture Garden and the High Museum of Art have both prohibited the physical touching of House I and House III, respectively, after the sculptures were originally open to public interaction.

At the Leeum, Samsung Museum of Art, the environmentally-induced damage to the paint coating of the second edition of House I mandated a complete restoration and repainting in 2015.
