= Ungers =

Ungers is a German surname. Some notable people with the surname include:

- Oswald Mathias Ungers (1926–2007), German architect, architectural theorist
- Simon Ungers (1957–2006), German architect and artist

== See also ==
- Ungers Corners, Ontario, a community in Ontario
- Ungersheim, Alsace
