= Chair Transformation Number 20B =

1996 abstract sculpture by Lucas Samaras

- Artist: Lucas Samaras
- Year: 1996
- Type: sculpture
- Dimensions: 360 cm × 64.8 cm × 220 cm (141 in × 25 1/2 in × 88 in)
- Location: National Gallery of Art Sculpture Garden; Washington, D.C.; 38.890764°N 77.022433°W
- Owner: National Gallery of Art

Chair Transformation Number 20B is a 1996 abstract sculpture, by Lucas Samaras, in the National Gallery of Art Sculpture Garden.

== See also ==
- List of public art in Washington, D.C., Ward 2
