= Personnage Gothique, Oiseau-Eclair =

Sculpture by Joan Miró

- Artist: Joan Miró
- Year: 1974
- Type: sculpture
- Dimensions: 450.2 cm × 200.0 cm × 160.0 cm (14 ft 9 1/4 in × 6 ft 6 3/4 in × 5 ft 3 in)
- Location: National Gallery of Art Sculpture Garden; Washington, D.C.; 38°53′30.48″N 77°1′24.25″W
- Owner: National Gallery of Art

Personnage Gothique, Oiseau-Eclair is a bronze sculpture by Joan Miró.

It was created in 1974, and cast in 1977. It is in the National Gallery of Art Sculpture Garden, in Washington, D.C..

== See also ==
- List of public art in Washington, D.C., Ward 2
