= Loss and Regeneration =

Sculpture in Washington, D.C

- Artist: Joel Shapiro
- Year: 1993
- Medium: Bronze sculpture
- Location: Washington, D.C., United States
- Coordinates: 38°53′12.5″N 77°1′59.6″W

Loss and Regeneration is a bronze sculpture in 2 parts: figure and house, made in 1993 by Joel Shapiro installed at the United States Holocaust Memorial Museum in Washington, D.C.

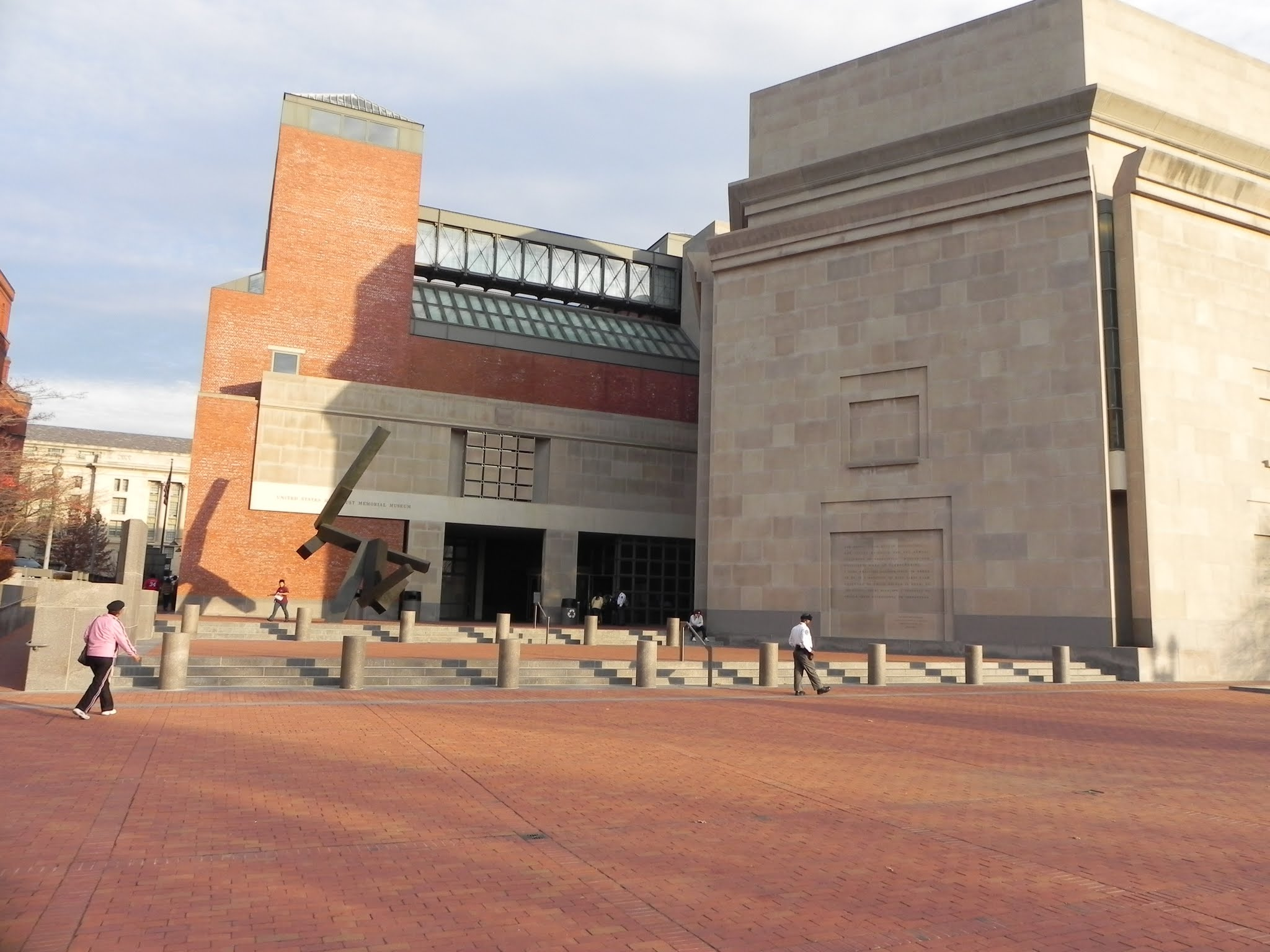
Joel Shapiro Loss and Regeneration, 1993, Monumental bronze sculpture in 2 parts: Figure and House

== See also ==
- List of public art in Washington, D.C., Ward 2
