= Graft (Paine) =

- Artist: Roxy Paine
- Year: 2008-2009
- Type: sculpture
- Dimensions: 14 m × 14 m (45 ft × 45 ft)
- Location: National Gallery of Art Sculpture Garden; Washington, D.C.; 38.890833°N 77.023333°W
- Owner: National Gallery of Art

Graft is a sculpture by Roxy Paine. It was installed on October 26–30, 2008, in the National Gallery of Art Sculpture Garden.

It is part of a "Dendroids" series begun in 1998. Made of Stainless steel, it weighs 16,000 pounds.

== See also ==
- List of public art in Washington, D.C., Ward 2
