= Aurora (di Suvero) =

Public artwork by Mark di Suvero

Coordinates: 38°53′29.85″N 77°1′21.41″W

- Artist: Mark di Suvero
- Year: 1992-1993
- Type: sculpture
- Dimensions: 5.0 m × 6.0 m (16.4 ft × 19.6 ft × 28.8 ½ ft)
- Location: National Gallery of Art Sculpture Garden; Washington, D.C.
- Owner: National Gallery of Art

Aurora is a public artwork by American artist Mark di Suvero. It is in the collection of the National Gallery of Art and on display at the National Gallery of Art Sculpture Garden in Washington, D.C., United States.

== Description ==
Aurora consists of 8 tons of steel, resting on three diagonal supports. Certain "linear elements converge within a central circular hub and then explode outward."

== Information ==
The name of the sculpture comes from a poem by Federico García Lorca about New York City.

=== Acquisition ===
The sculpture is a gift from the Gift of Morris and Gwendolyn Cafritz Foundation.

=== Reception ===
According to the National Gallery of Art the supports and steel "combine massive scale with elegance of proportion," and "imparting tension and dynamism." Michael Kimmelman of The New York Times called the work "pure compacted energy".

== See also ==
- List of public art in Washington, D.C., Ward 2
