= National Gallery of Art Sculpture Garden =

Sculpture garden in Washington, D.C.

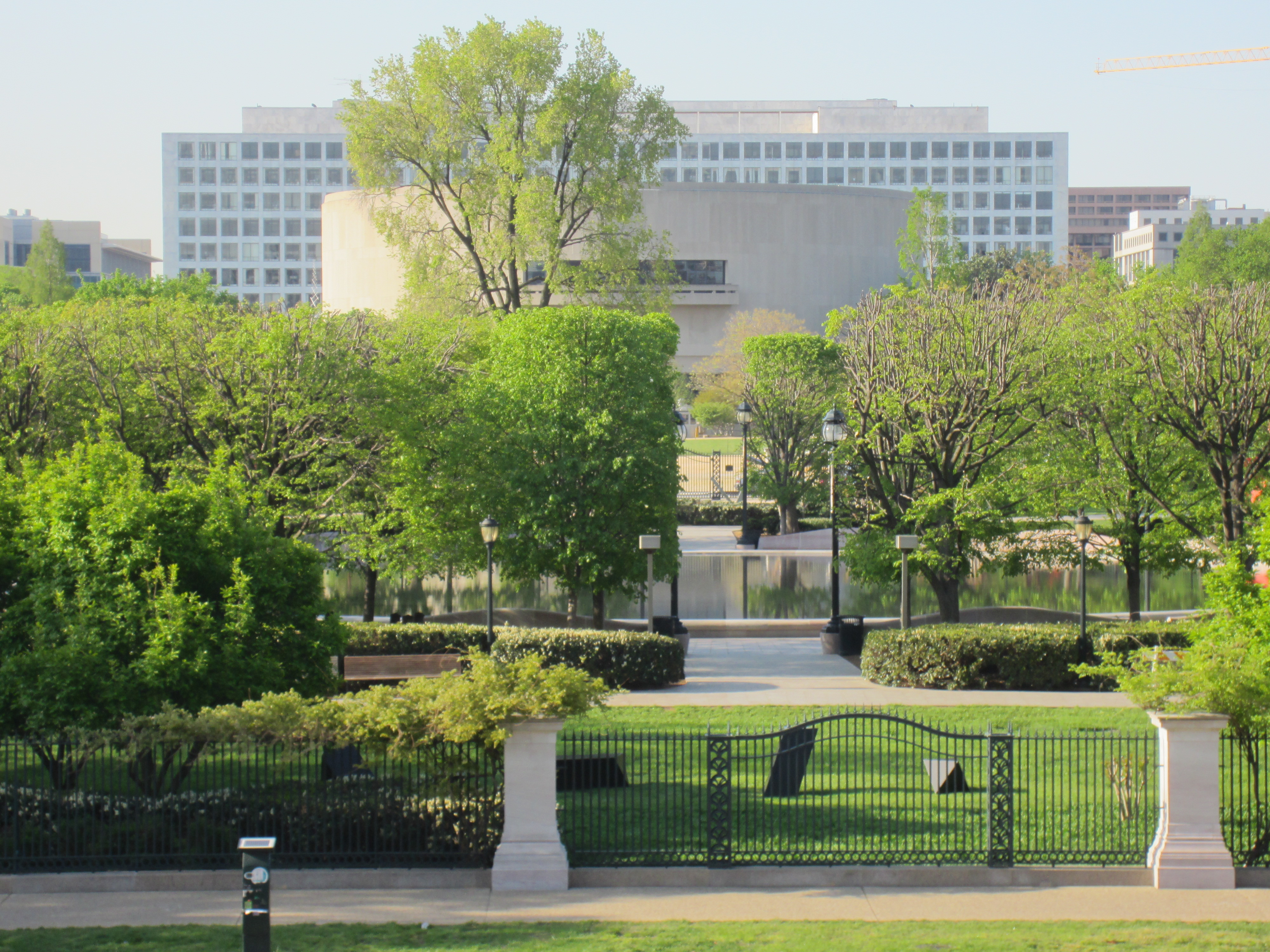
- Interactive map of National Gallery of Art Sculpture Garden
- Location: Between 7th and 9th Streets along Constitution Avenue NW
- Coordinates: 38.8913°N 77.0230°W
- Area: 6.1 acres (2.5 ha)
- Opened: May 23, 1999
- Owner: National Gallery of Art
- Landscape Architect: Laurie Olin
- Website: Official website

The National Gallery of Art Sculpture Garden is the most recent addition to the National Gallery of Art in Washington, D.C. in the United States. It is located in the National Mall between the National Gallery's West Building and the Smithsonian Institution's National Museum of Natural History.

Completed and opened to the public on May 23, 1999, the location provides an outdoor setting for exhibiting several pieces from the museum's contemporary sculpture collection. The collection is centered on a fountain which, from December to March, is converted to an ice-skating rink. (Such a rink predated the construction of the garden.) The outdoor Pavilion Café lies adjacent to the garden.

Laurie Olin and his firm, OLIN, were the landscape architects who redesigned the garden.

== Works ==
- Claes Oldenburg; Coosje van Bruggen, Typewriter Eraser, Scale X, 1999
- Joan Miró, Personnage Gothique, Oiseau-Eclair, 1974/1977
- Louise Bourgeois, Spider, 1996/1997
- Tony Smith, Wandering Rocks, 1967
- Magdalena Abakanowicz, Puellae, 1992
- Mark di Suvero, Aurora, 1992–93
- Scott Burton, Six-Part Seating, 1985/1998
- Joel Shapiro, Untitled, 1989
- Ellsworth Kelly, Stele II, 1973
- Barry Flanagan, Thinker on a Rock, 1997
- Sol LeWitt, Four-Sided Pyramid, 1965
- Lucas Samaras, Chair Transformation Number 20B, 1996
- Tony Smith, Moondog, 1964
- David Smith, Cubi XI, 1963
- David Smith, Cubi XXVI, 1965
- Alexander Calder, Cheval Rouge, 1974
- Roy Lichtenstein, House I, 1996/1998
- George Rickey, Cluster of Four Cubes, 1992
- Hector Guimard, An Entrance to the Paris Métropolitain, 1902/1913
- Roxy Paine, Graft, 2008–2009
- Robert Indiana, AMOR, 1998/2006
