= Untitled (Shapiro, 1989) =

Public sculpture in Washington, D.C.

- Artist: Joel Shapiro
- Year: 1989
- Type: sculpture
- Dimensions: 170 cm × 200 cm × 158.8 cm (65 in × 77 in × 62 1/2 in)
- Location: National Gallery of Art Sculpture Garden; Washington, D.C.; 38°53′29.64″N 77°1′20.82″W
- Owner: National Gallery of Art

Untitled, 1989, is a bronze abstract sculpture by Joel Shapiro.

Constructed in 1989, it is located at the National Gallery of Art Sculpture Garden.

== See also ==
- List of public art in Washington, D.C., Ward 2
- Untitled (Shapiro, 1990)
