= Barry Flanagan =

Welsh sculptor

- Barry Flanagan
- Born: 11 January 1941; Prestatyn, Wales
- Died: 31 August 2009 (aged 68); Santa Eulària des Riu, Ibiza, Spain
- Education: Birmingham College of Art and Crafts (1957–1958); Saint Martin's School of Art (1964–1966)
- Known for: Sculpture
- Awards: Royal Academician (1991); Commander of the Order of the British Empire (1996)

Barry Flanagan OBE RA (11 January 1941 - 31 August 2009) was an Irish-Welsh sculptor. He is best known for his bronze statues of hares and other animals.

== Biography ==
Flanagan was born on 11 January 1941 in Prestatyn, North Wales. From 1957-58, he studied architecture at Birmingham College of Art and Crafts. He studied sculpture at Saint Martin's School of Art in London from 1964 to 1966, and from 1967 to 1971 taught both at Saint Martin's and at the Central School of Art and Design.

He became an Irish citizen and lived in Dublin from 2000 to the year of his passing. Flanagan died on 31 August 2009, aged 68, from motor neurone disease in Santa Eulalia del Río, Ibiza, Spain.

He was the subject of a South Bank Show in 1983 directed by Don Featherstone and a biographical film by Peter Bach, The Man Who Sculpted Hares: Barry Flanagan, A Life.

== Works ==
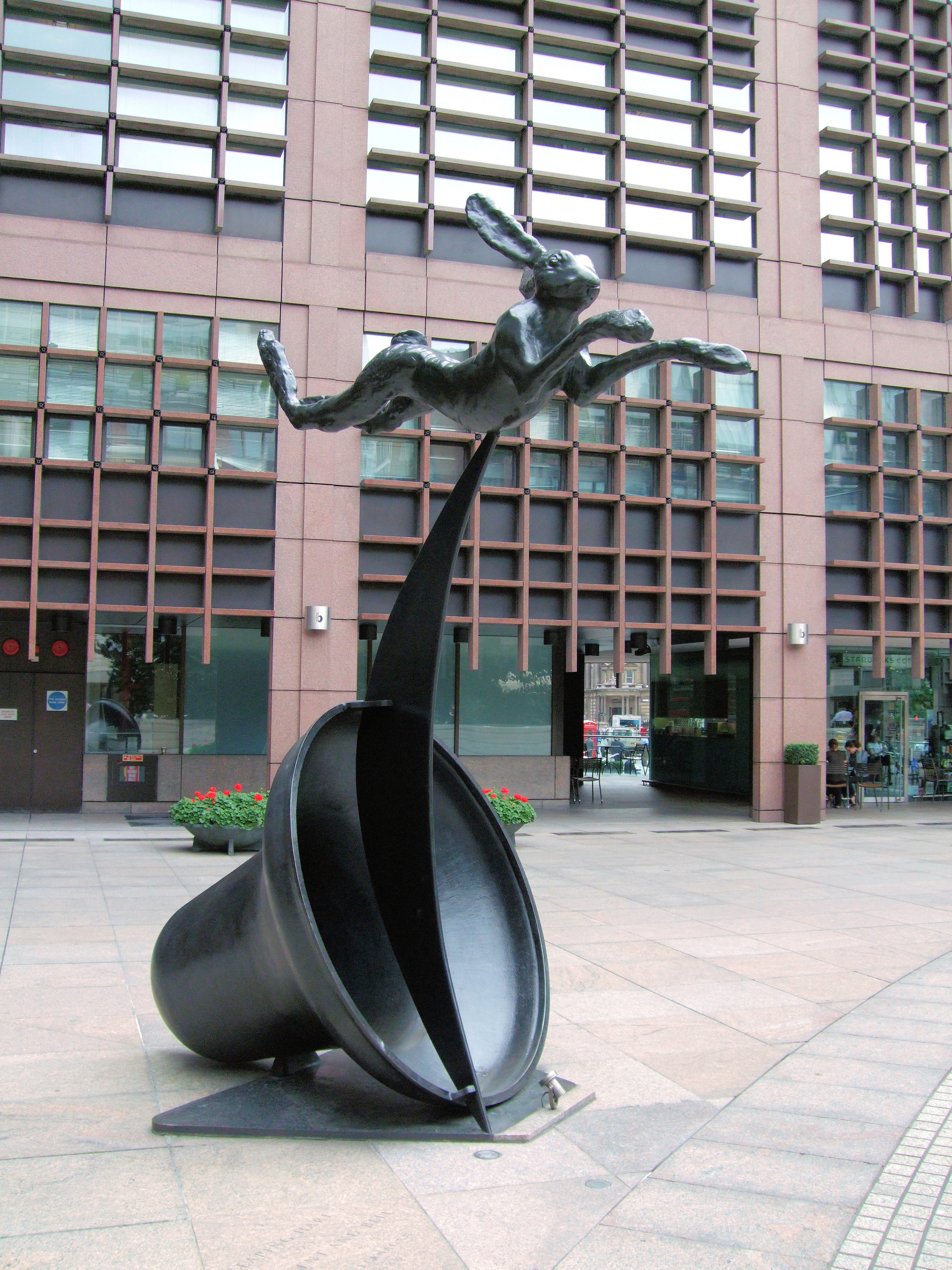
Leaping Hare on Crescent and Bell, London (1988)

Untitled sculpture (Grimbergen)

Castings of Flanagan's Thinker on a Rock are installed at Washington University in St. Louis, the John and Mary Pappajohn Sculpture Park in Des Moines, Iowa, Utrecht, O’Connell Street in Dublin, the Philbrook Museum of Art, in Tulsa, OK, and the National Gallery of Art Sculpture Garden (Washington, D.C.)

Flanagan's hare statue, Large Left-Handed Drummer, was on display in Union Square, Manhattan from 18 February to 24 June 2007.

Flanagan's 1993 Large Mirror Nijinski, again with two hares, is displayed at the Skulpturen Park Köln, in Cologne.

Tate Britain held a retrospective show Early Works 1965–1982 from September 2011 to January 2012. This exhibition contained many examples of his less well known pieces using materials such as cloth and rope, as well as some early bronze hare sculptures for which he gained renown.

At an exhibition held by Sotheby's at Chatsworth House, Derbyshire, in September–October 2012, fifteen of Flanagan's works were shown in a parkland setting. They included Large Nijinski on Anvil Point and Nijinski Hare, placed at opposite ends of the Canal Pond.

Flanagan donated a bronze horse statue, San Marco Horse, to Jesus College, Cambridge in 2009. Prior to this, it had been on exhibition in the college since 1988.

== Selected solo exhibitions ==
- 2021 Barry Flanagan, Galerie von Bartha, Basel
- 2020 Barry Flanagan, Alchemy of the Theatre, Waddington Custot, London
- 2019 Barry Flanagan, Ikon Gallery, Birmingham
- 2011 Barry Flanagan: Works from 1964—1982, Tate Britain
- 2010 Barry Flanagan: Works 1966—2008, Waddington Galleries, London
- 2009 Paul Kasmin (Park Avenue Armory), New York
- 2009 Barry Flanagan: Hare Coursed, New Art Centre, Roche Court, Salisbury, Wiltshire
- 2008 Vero Beach Museum of Art, Vero Beach, Florida
- 2008 Waddington Galleries, London
- 2007 Paul Kasmin Gallery, New York
- 2006 Barry Flanagan: Sculpture, 1965-2005, Irish Museum of Modern Art, Dublin
- 1974 Projects: Barry Flanagan, Museum of Modern Art, New York
- 1966 Rowan Gallery, London

== Bibliography ==
Barry Flanagan: Sculpture, Venice Biennale, British Council, 1982

Barry Flanagan: Sculpture, 1965-2005, Enrique Juncosa, Mel Gooding and Bruce Arnold, Irish Museum of Modern Art, Dublin, 2006

With Barry Flanagan, Travels through Time and Spain, Richard McNeff, The Lilliput Press, 2012

Barry Flanagan, Jo Melvin, Teresa Gleadowe, Mel Gooding, Bruce McLean, Waddington Custot, 2017

== See also ==
- Hare on Ball and Claw, Columbus, Ohio
