= House I =

Sculpture by Roy Lichtenstein

- Artist: Roy Lichtenstein
- Year: 1996–1998
- Type: sculpture
- Dimensions: 290 cm × 450 cm × 130 cm (115 in × 176 in × 52 in)
- Location: National Gallery of Art Sculpture Garden, Washington, D.C.; 38.890833°N 77.023333°W
- Owner: National Gallery of Art
- Accession: 1998.147.1

House I is a sculpture by Roy Lichtenstein. It has an illusion, which makes it appear inside out, or normally, depending on which way the viewer sees it.

It is located at the National Gallery of Art Sculpture Garden.

It was constructed of painted aluminum, modeled in 1996 and constructed in 1999.

Among his last works, it was a part of the House series (Lichtenstein). House II was shown at the Venice Biennale in 1997, and House III was shown at the Metropolitan Museum of Art.

== Illusion ==
The house uses optical illusion to play with perspective. To appreciate the full effect, one must walk at a steady rate along the arc of the sidewalk that runs in front of and nearly perpendicular to the sculpture. Turning the head to one side, facing the sculpture, the house will appear to be spinning in space.

== See also ==
- 1996 in art
- List of public art in Washington, D.C., Ward 2
