= An Entrance to the Paris Métropolitain =

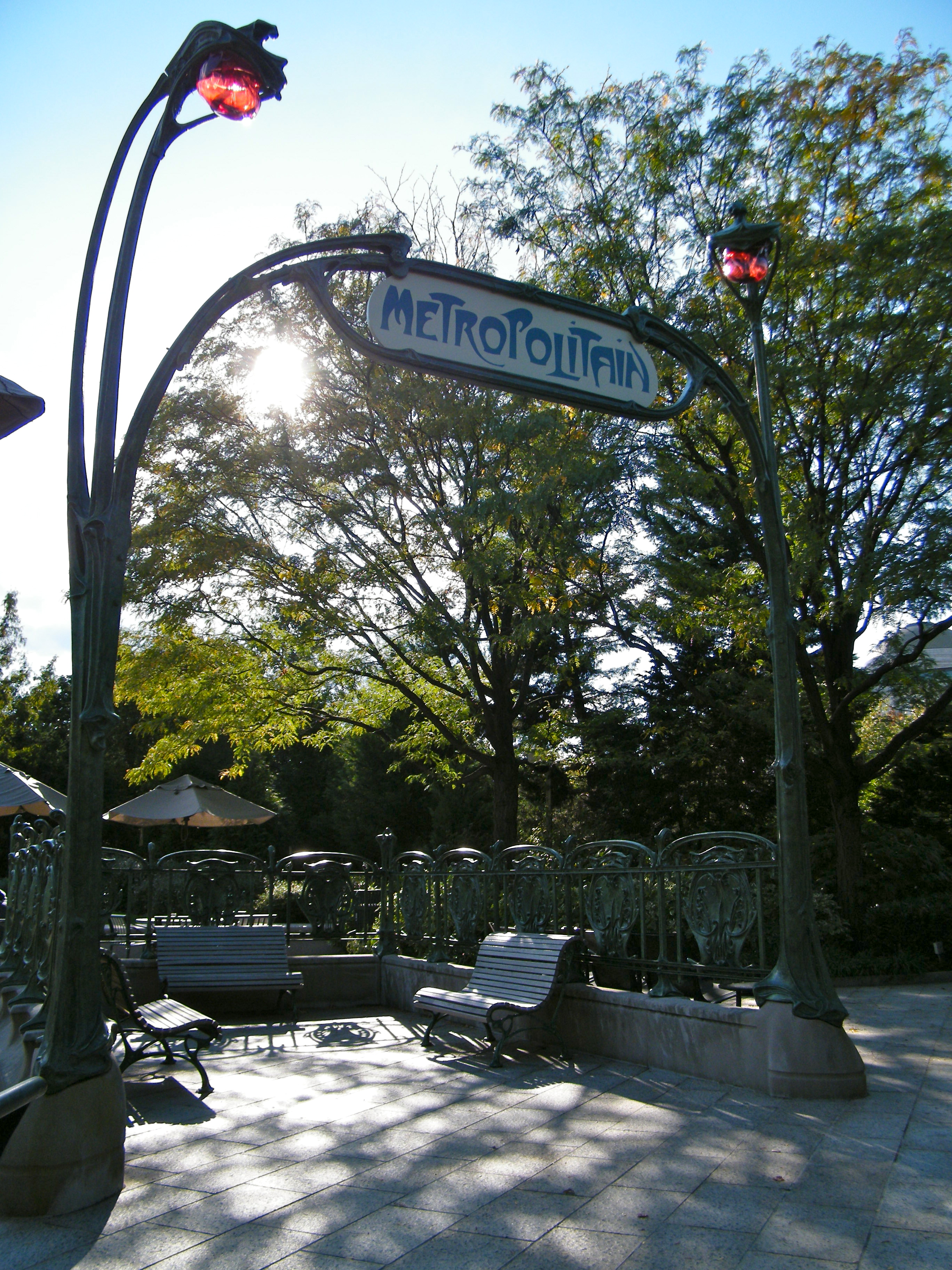
- Artist: Hector Guimard
- Location: Washington, D.C., United States
- 38.891065°N 77.023461°W

An Entrance to the Paris Métropolitain is a sculpture by Hector Guimard, conceived in 1902 and fabricated between 1902 and 1913. Guimard designed 141 entrances to the Paris Métro of varying types, 86 of which are still standing. One is featured at the National Gallery of Art Sculpture Garden in Washington, D.C.

== History ==
=== Conception ===
Before the turn of the century, the French were lacking a public transportation system. During their time of reconstruction during the mid-1800s, London was building their “Underground.” This time would have been ideal for the French to build such a transportation system. City officials did realize at the time, that without a metro system, Paris would suffer in the future. Despite this, Parisians did not like the idea of something so industrial being all over the city. The French were so opposed to the idea of a metro that the first line had to be built entirely underground without ripping up surface streets. Obviously the above ground effect was important to Parisians. This meant that the entrances to the metro had to look good but not overwhelm the surrounding areas.

=== Selection of Guimard ===
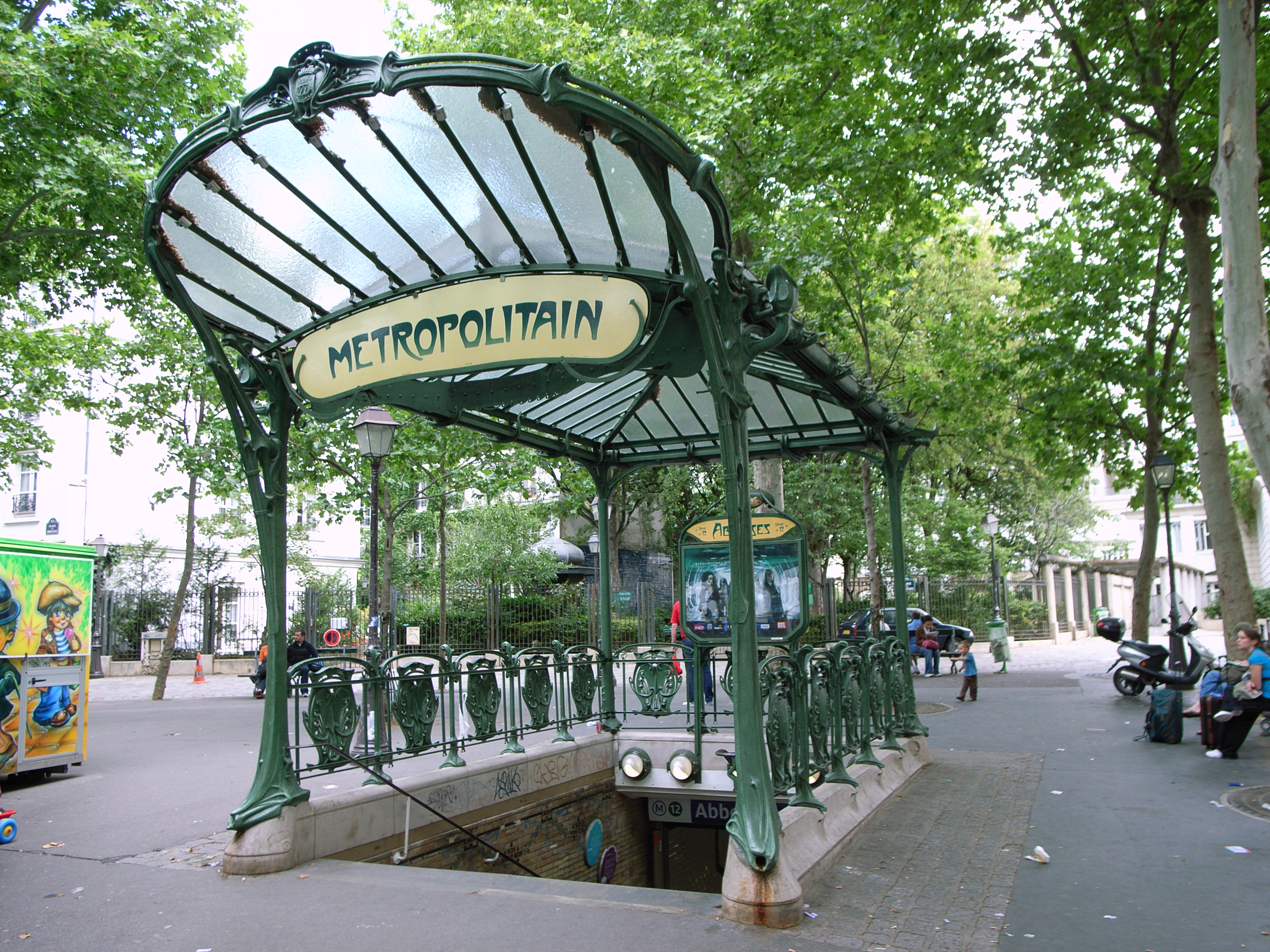
A covered entrance in Paris.

After several designs were refused by the citizens of Paris a compromise was made to make the metro's above ground components a work of art rather than an industrial eyesore. The entrances were said to be sleek and modern, but none of the proposed designs in the past had achieved either of these descriptions. Most of the previous designs had been made to look classical and were too bulky for Paris sidewalks. A contest was held to see who would design the above-ground entrances and stations. The winner, an architecture firm by the name of: Duray, Lemaresquier, and Paumier; however, was not the one who designed the entrances. The decision was overruled by Adrien Benard, the chairman of the Conseil Municipal de Paris. Instead Hector Guimard, an art nouveau artist who had not entered the contest, won the honor of designing the entrances. He was chosen because of his own take on the “Art Nouveau” style and because his metal designs were cheaper and easier to make than other designs involving masonry and stone. Other than the practical reasons, Guimard's designs, which centered around sleek lines that come from natural curves of plants, were better made with steel. Guimard made different designs of above-ground entrances ranging from grand steel and glass pavilions to the most common type of entrance, a small railing, two lamps, and a sign saying Metropolitain. By 1904, 141 stations were completed, most of which were the most famous type of entrance.

=== Later history ===
Parisians did not necessarily like the entrances. In fact they called the font which Guimard himself designed “un-French.” Parisians also called the green on the entrance “german.” Despite the bad reception from Parisians, the entrances were kept up rather than being taken down because of popular opinion. All of the entrances were above ground, outdoors. Because of this, they had to endure the sun, rain and all of the damages that come with the elements. Many of the entrances began peeling, fading, and falling into disrepair. Many of the entrances were taken down before the Art Nouveau style was considered worthy to preserve. Right now, only 86 of the original 141 entrances remain in use. The ones that were not taken down had been repaired and repainted so many times that they bore little resemblance to the originals. Parisians eventually grew to love the entrances as a symbol of Paris.

== Restoration process ==
One of the original entrances now stands in the sculpture garden at the National Gallery of Art. Because the entrance was “repaired’ so much that none of the colors were original, it had to be restored by the gallery. In fact, the existing paint layers were, “faded and chalky, and were actively lifting from the cast iron structure” Layers of corrosion inhibitors and more durable paint had to be added for the harsh winters in Washington D.C. The restoration was done by conservators and contractors who restored the original “faux bronze” look which Guimard intended.

== See also ==
- Paris Métro entrances by Hector Guimard
