= Cluster of Four Cubes =

Sculpture by George Rickey

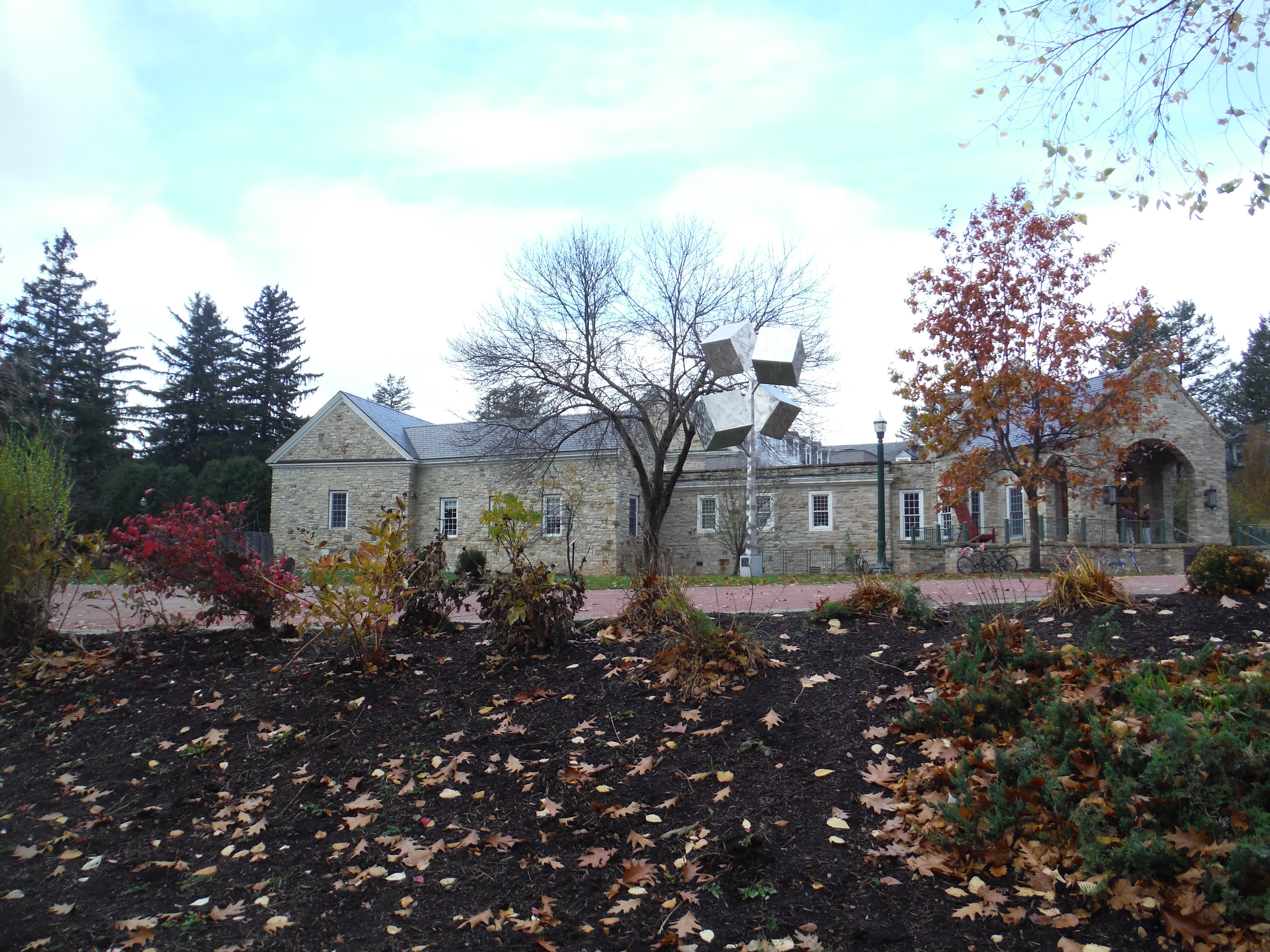
- George Rickey's sculpture "Cluster of Four Cubes" at St. Lawrence University, Canton, New York
- Artist: George Rickey
- Year: 1992
- Location: National Gallery of Art Sculpture Garden, Washington, D.C., United States
- 38.8913°N 77.0230°W

Cluster of Four Cubes is a 1992 kinetic stainless steel sculpture by George Rickey, installed at the National Gallery of Art Sculpture Garden in Washington, D.C., United States.

There is also a sculpture installed at St. Lawrence University in Canton, New York.

== See also ==
- 1992 in art
- List of public art in Washington, D.C., Ward 2
