= Thinker on a Rock =

Artwork by Barry Flanagan

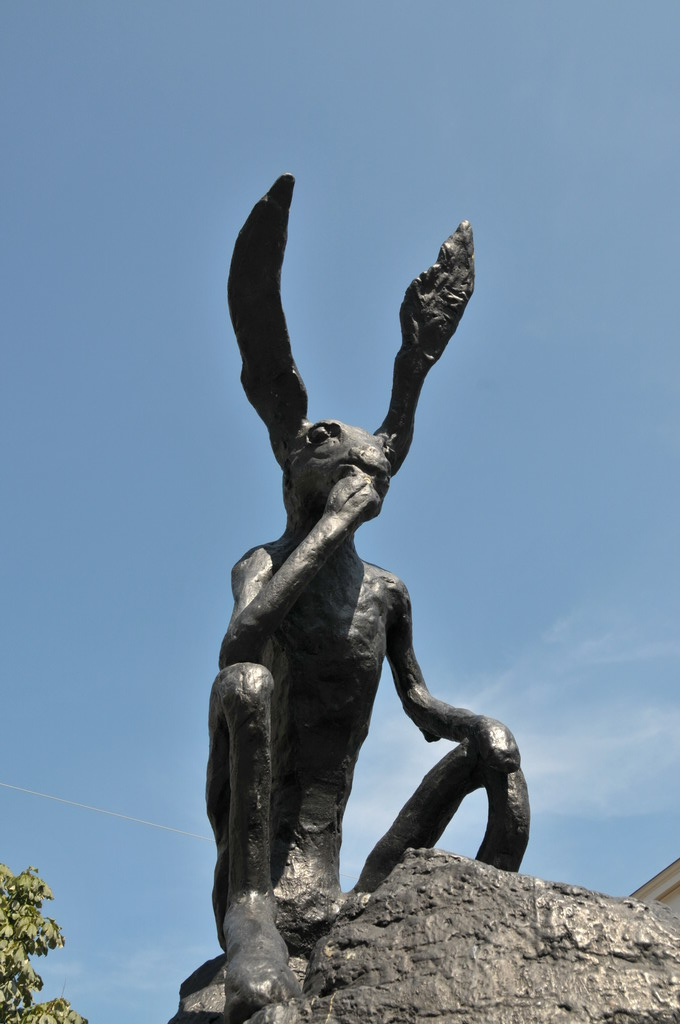
- Artist: Barry Flanagan
- Year: 1997
- Type: sculpture
- Dimensions: 334.0 cm × 257.8 cm × 181.6 cm (10 ft 11 1/2 in × 8 ft 5 1/2 in × 5 ft 11 1/2 in)
- Location: National Gallery of Art Sculpture Garden; Washington, D.C.; 38°53′27.84″N 77°1′20.36″W
- Owner: National Gallery of Art

Thinker on a Rock is a bronze sculpture by Barry Flanagan, from 1997.

Brian Ferriso, executive director of the Philbrook Museum of Art, said:

"The playful subject matter clearly references several art historical traditions, including that of Rodin. In addition to the subject, this work's expressive nature encapsulates the artist's unique ability to create three-dimensional 'gestural' drawings with bronze."

There are eight casts of the work, with six of them installed at:

1. Washington University in St. Louis
2. John and Mary Pappajohn Sculpture Park, Des Moines, Iowa
3. Utrecht, Netherlands
4. O’Connell Street in Dublin
5. Philbrook Museum of Art, in Tulsa, Oklahoma
6. The National Gallery of Art Sculpture Garden, in Washington, D.C.

== Gallery ==
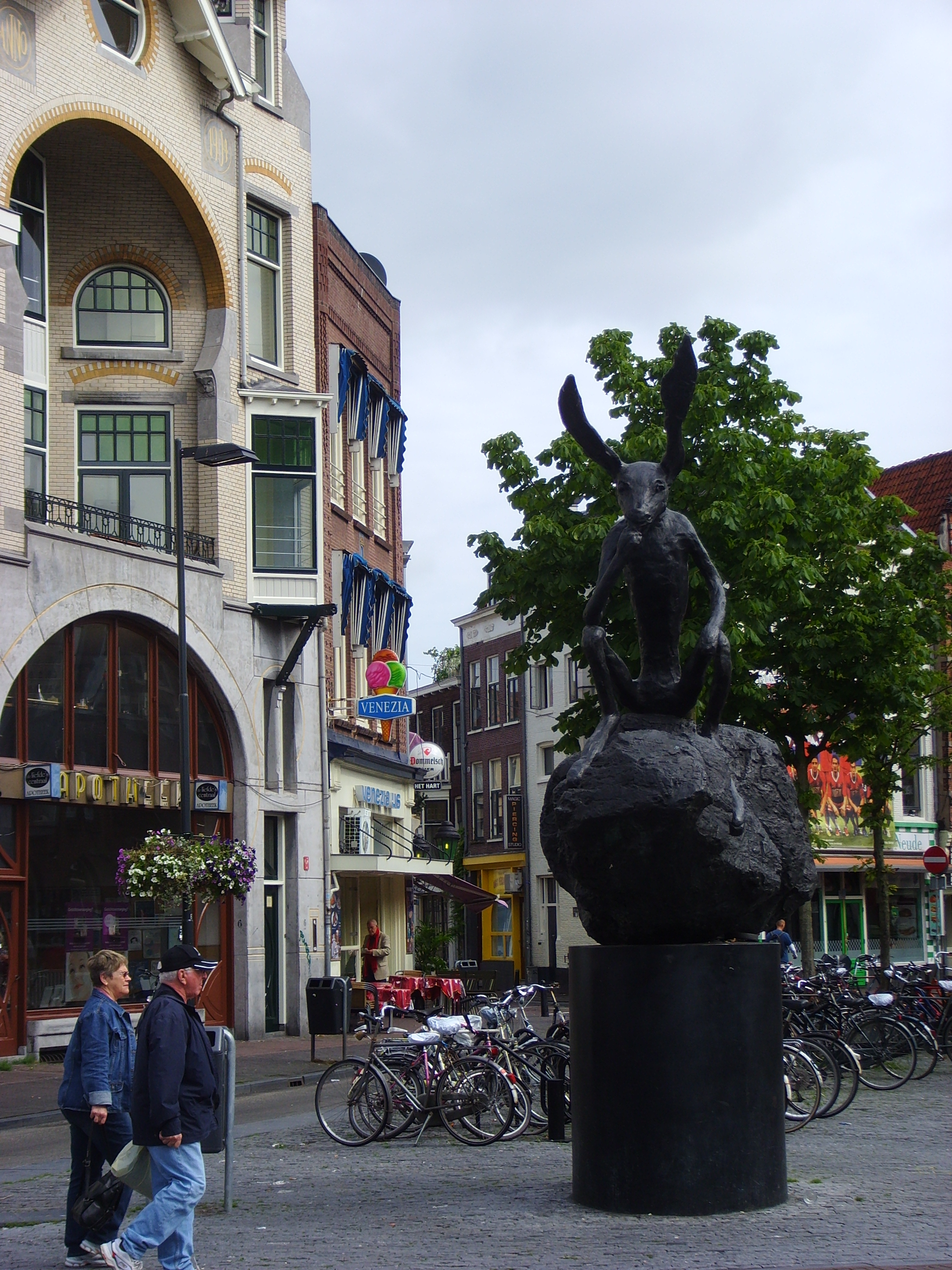
Thinker on a Rock, Utrecht, Netherlands

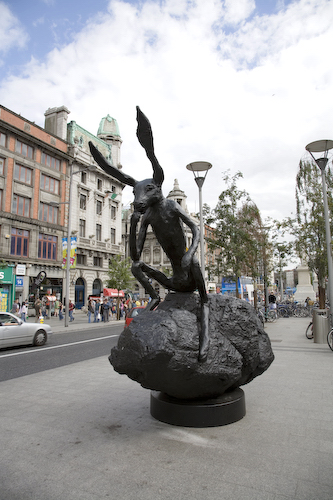
Thinker on a Rock, Dublin, Ireland

== See also ==
- List of public art in Washington, D.C., Ward 2
