= Puellae =

1982 sculpture by Magdalena Abakanowicz

- Artist: Magdalena Abakanowicz
- Year: 1982
- Type: Sculpture Group
- Dimensions: 93.3 cm × 28 cm × 23 cm (36 3/4 in × 11 in × 9 in)
- Location: National Gallery of Art Sculpture Garden, Washington, D.C.; 38°53′29.8644″N 77°1′21.95″W
- Owner: National Gallery of Art

Puellae is a bronze sculpture by Magdalena Abakanowicz.

Consisting of 30 figures, created in 1982, it originally showed at the Marlborough Gallery.

It was installed in 1999, at the National Gallery of Art Sculpture Garden.

== See also ==
- List of public art in Washington, D.C., Ward 2
