= Bonnie Collura =

American artist

- Born: 1970 (age 55–56); Port Jefferson, New York
- Education: Yale University, Virginia Commonwealth University
- Known for: Sculpture, installation, public art, textiles, drawing
- Spouse: Matthew J. Olson
- Awards: Guggenheim Fellowship, Foundation for Contemporary Arts
- Website: Bonnie Collura Studio

Bonnie Collura, "The Prince" exhibition, Smack Mellon, 2019; counterclockwise: Matriarch/Heavy Metal/Jesus, Skin of a Dancing Ghost: Jesus, Guardian Blue, Skin of a Dancing Ghost: Lincoln, Mortality/Evening/Lincoln (all 2018).

Bonnie Collura (born 1970) is an American artist known for figurative multi-media sculptures, textiles and installations created by processes of compositing and sampling. Her art oscillates between abstraction and figuration, mixing aesthetics from baroque sculpture, contemporary animation and quilting with iconic fragments from pop culture, art history and myth. She has embraced theatricality and excess, intertextuality and digital-age influences in her work, often exploring hybridized, disjointed bodies, surrogate characters and reconfigured literary tropes. Sculpture critic Ann Landi has written, "Collura incorporates wildly diverse materials and processes while also drawing on a wide array of references—everything from cartoons and movies like Star Wars to highbrow texts such as The Prince and Frankenstein ... Diffuse and open-ended, appealing to storytelling and world-making, her work continues to evolve, carrying on a feminist tradition in its materials and mythologies."

Collura has exhibited at institutions including the Walker Art Center, Smack Mellon, Hallwalls, and Dallas Museum of Art. She has been recognized with a Guggenheim Fellowship and awards from the Foundation for Contemporary Arts and Aldrich Contemporary Art Museum. Her work belongs to the public collections of the Dallas Museum of Art, Skulpturen Park Köln (Cologne Sculpture Park), and Walker Art Center, among others.

== Education and career ==
Collura was born in 1970 in Port Jefferson, New York. She received a BFA (1994) from Virginia Commonwealth University (VCU), where she studied with sculptors Elizabeth King and Myron Helfgott. Her early work at VCU and Yale University (MFA, 1996) was figurative and critically examined Disney cartoon and fairy-tale characters as constructed images.

Soon after graduating, Collura began to exhibit, gaining recognition through group shows at Apex Art, the Aldrich Museum, and Thread Waxing Space, and solo shows at Janice Guy (1997), Basilico Fine Arts (1998, 1999) and Lehmann Maupin (2000) in New York, the Dallas Museum of Art (1998) and Walker Art Center (2000). She had later solo exhibitions at Susan Inglett Gallery (2003, 2004), Claire Oliver Fine Arts (2006), Smack Mellon (2019), and Hallwalls (2022), among others.

Bonnie Collura, Sleeping Death (Martyr Yellow), 1997.

== Work and critical reception ==
Collura emerged in the later 1990s among artists responding to such issues as the disavowal of referentiality and narrative by modernism, postmodern information overload, and the collapse of various universal distinctions (e.g., organism and machine, human and animal). Her work has often been described as "hybrid," fitting disparate physical and conceptual elements, processes, references and signifiers into uneasy wholes. She employs recognizable elements of classic pre-modernist statuary (such as expressive poses and gesture), while challenging that tradition through unconventional construction techniques and fusions of abstract and organic form. Her method has been described as a "shuffled deck" of images and meanings crossing centuries, aesthetic inspirations (the religious, erotic baroque of Bernini, Disney animation, the grotesque) and cultural sources (mythical, Biblical and religious stories, classic Hollywood movies).

Critics ascribe to her work a sense of mutability (despite its generally fixed form) and duality rendering it vaguely familiar, yet iconoclastic and alien. Curator John Massier described it as "figurative-fluid"—in a temporalized state of flux and becoming, with appearance and meaning shifts based on a viewer's perspective. She takes a similar approach to literature, in postmodern deconstructive fashion dissecting and reassembling tropes—often involving love, loyalty, gender and the body with lethal consequences—through a contemporary feminist lens. Throughout her career, Collura has supplemented her work with an elaborate, if hermetic, cosmology sometimes conveyed in drawings, charts or texts.

=== Exhibitions 1997–2007 ===
In her first solo exhibition, "To the Third" (Janice Guy, 1997), Collura fused the Greek underworld myth of Persephone and the story of Snow White into an ambitious sculptural installation exploring the neo-pagan Triple Goddess (Maiden/Mother/Crone) theme. The tableau of interlocking, almost melted-looking figural and landscape elements—semi-organic shrouded fragments, gesturing limbs and forms resembling theatrical props, prototypes or debris from children's games—was hand-carved from foam insulation and smoothly painted in a cartoon-like color scheme. Artforum's Jan Avgikos wrote that it "tapped into a cutting edge where comics, cartoons, and movies meet computer-generated models, animation, and special effects ... a virtual reality of mutability: everything is familiar, thoroughly generic, and constantly morphing. Characters bleed into one another, crossing temporal and spatial boundaries."

Bonnie Collura, Death of the Virgin, detail, 2006.

In subsequent exhibitions, Collura extended that work's methods. She exhibited ten multipart sculptures in "From A to C and Back Again" (Basilico, 1998), which employed shattered fragments reassembled into legible and semi-legible, candy-coated forms and multiple non-linear narratives. Sleeping Death (Martyr Yellow) (1997) revisited female transformation, Bernini's The Blessed Ludovica Albertoni and the Persephone fertility myth, combining the head and neck of a young deer and the torso and head of a swooning, Sleeping Beauty-like woman atop a pedestal heaped with corn. The "Liberty" exhibition (Basilico, 1999) presented drawings of reconfiguring forms constructed like storyboards and similarly in-flux sculptures, such as Model for Liberty (Dorothy Gale as Jesus) (1999), which mixed erotic, natural (a stag shedding antlers) and religious (a crown of thorns) elements.

Between 2000 and 2007, in exhibitions such as "In the Gutter" (Lehmann Maupin, 2000) and "Rebel Angel" (Susan Inglett, 2003), Collura experimented with increasingly abstracted, monochrome sculptures. They melded barely recognizable human and animal forms, branches, classical drapery and commedia dell'arte costuming, seemingly embattled to materialize out of central, amorphous masses (e.g., Chain Reaction, 1999). Reviewers characterized these works as "dramatically abject" portrayals of ecstasy or distress that suggested souls entrapped in terrestrial chaos or angels expelled into corporeality as monsters and twisted freaks of nature. New York Times critic Holland Cotter likened them to "multi-vehicle collisions ... Baroque sculpture, Disney animation and Butler's Lives of the Saints seem to have met at meltdown speed, leaving stray limbs and maimed myths protruding from the wreckage." Guardian (2003) portrayed a 21st-century Madonna with a clown's nose and an erupting hand, while Death of a Virgin (2006–11) depicted a large-eared, shattered figure on its back atop a vertical mass, as if after a great fall.

=== The Prince and later work ===
Since 2005, Collura has worked on sculptures, textiles, performances, videos and installations forming The Prince Project. It consists of four parts—"Dust," "Wicked," "Seven," and "White Light"—and critiques cultural patterns that recycle iconic characters, gestures and polarizing traits into male heroes. The project originated in Collura's interest in constructing a persona or surrogate self, à la the Pygmalion, Galatea and Frankenstein myths; as a female artist-creator, however, she reverses the traditional gender relationships of those stories.

The sculptures and installations of the project's "Wicked" portion roughly trace the Prince character's evolution from a mythical Golem (a being made from inanimate matter like clay or mud) to its apotheosis as a heroic ideal pieced together from aspects of four male archetypes: Jesus, St. Sebastian, C-3PO and Abraham Lincoln. A unifying thread between those four figures is that each suffered an identifiable wound associated with martyrdom and fragility, holes that Collura has re-interpreted as portals or vaginal openings representing the potentially disruptive energy of women.

Bonnie Collura, Rebuke: Two Months Until Fifty, 2020.

Prince figures date back in Collura's work to Spiral (2005–6), a swirling, vertical, ceiling-hung sculpture of a trapped figure both lifted upward by balloons and dragged down by aluminum arrow piercings, inspired by St. Sebastian, the notion of mystic vision at death, and Mickey Mouse. The Prince's "Seven" works also focus on the figure; its seven figural triads weave tropes involving vices and virtues (e.g., the outdoor work, Doc/Pride/Humility, 2011, Ehrenbreitstein Fortress). The figures balance chaos and composure, optically shifting between forms and states of unrest or becoming, depending on vantage point.

In her later work, Collura often turned to soft-form constructions made with found fabric and materials that evoke a sense of ever-changing identity. The sewn construction methods of these works match those of her solid sculptures (cast or molded, thin shells fitted or "fused" together), while challenging the masculine norm of stable figurative form. The Armor for White Light (2012–14)—part of a larger "White Light" video/installation project—was a ten-layer, wearable sculpture stitched like layered Samurai armor using paper strips cut from airbrushed drawings she made. In her 2019 exhibition, "Prince" (Smack Mellon), Collura paired four solid mixed-media sculptures (one representing each Prince figure) with four corresponding translucent counterparts sewn in silk organza and suspended from the ceiling like sheaths or shed skins. New York Times critic Martha Schwendener described them as "complicated and anti-heroic work [that] takes patriarchy down a peg."

Collura's exhibition, "Mutable Bodies" (Hallwalls, 2022) juxtaposed sewn, cast and carved works (some, like Rebuke: Two Months Until Fifty, 2020, employing all three methods) that shared formal properties, shapes, and modes of expression: for example, the textile work Guardian Blue (2018)—a vertical tangle of joined, repurposed quilted fabric whose shimmering, colored surfaces belied its hung, world-weary form—and Matriarch/HeavyMetal/Jesus (2018), a solid, undulating and ascending silver sculpture.

== Teaching and educational projects ==
Collura has been a professor of art at the School of Visual Arts at Penn State University since 2007. Prior to that she taught at Virginia Commonwealth University, Rhode Island School of Design, Tyler School of Art, Yale University and Parsons School of Design, among others. In 2021, she was recognized by the International Sculpture Center with an Outstanding Educator Award; she has also received several research grants from Penn State University.

In 2021–22, Penn State supported her trans-disciplinary project, "Together, Tacit," which enables the visually impaired and sighted to collaborate on sculptures inspired by how both groups "see" and learn by doing. The project makes use of a haptic, virtual reality glove that simulates sculpting in virtual space. These actions can be translated into three-dimensional marks that are 3D-printed and turned into tangible models which participants can fabricate into new forms.

== Recognition ==
In 2005, Collura was awarded a Guggenheim Fellowship. She has also received a Foundation for Contemporary Arts grant (2022), a fellowship from MacDowell Colony (2010), and an emerging artist award from the Aldrich Contemporary Art Museum (1999).

Her work belongs to the public collections of the Collection Lambert (France), Dallas Museum of Art, Skulpturen Park Köln, Kunstwegen (Germany), Walker Art Center, and Weatherspoon Art Museum, among others.
