= Hare on Ball and Claw =

Sculpture in Columbus, Ohio, U.S.

- The sculpture in 2018
- Artist: Barry Flanagan
- Medium: Bronze sculpture
- Location: Columbus, Ohio, United States
- 39°57′51.35″N 82°59′17.85″W

Hare on Ball and Claw is a 1989–1990 bronze sculpture by Barry Flanagan, installed outside the Columbus Museum of Art in Columbus, Ohio, United States. The sculpture, installed in 1997, measures approximately 132 x 48 x 36 inches and rests on a base that measures approximately 32 x 43 x 45.5 in.
