= Four-Sided Pyramid =

Artwork by Sol LeWitt

- Artist: Sol LeWitt
- Year: 1965
- Medium: concrete blocks and mortar
- Dimensions: 4.58 m × 10.07 m × 9.71 m (15 ft 3/8 in × 33 ft 1/2 in × 31 ft 10 1/4 in)
- Location: National Gallery of Art Sculpture Garden; Washington, D.C.; 38.89089900°N 77.02242200°W
- Owner: National Gallery of Art

Four-Sided Pyramid is a conceptual modular "structure", by Sol LeWitt, from 1965. It is located in the National Gallery of Art Sculpture Garden, in Washington, D.C..

The artist created a plan and Four-Sided Pyramid was constructed by others, in 1999.

== See also ==
- List of public art in Washington, D.C., Ward 2
