= Günther Förg =

German painter (1952–2013)

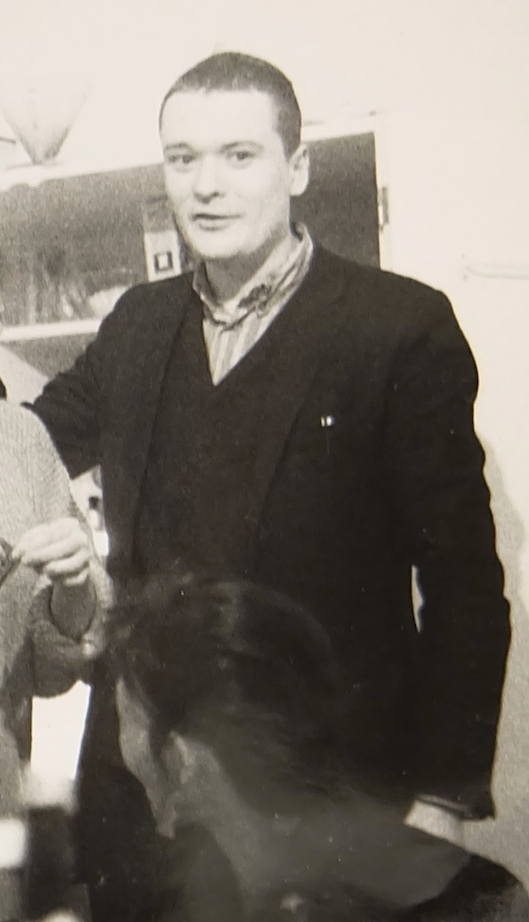
- Günther Förg (1984)
- Born: 5 December 1952; Füssen, Allgäu, West Germany
- Died: 5 December 2013 (aged 61); Colombier, Neuchâtel, Switzerland
- Occupations: German painter, graphic designer, sculptor and photographer.

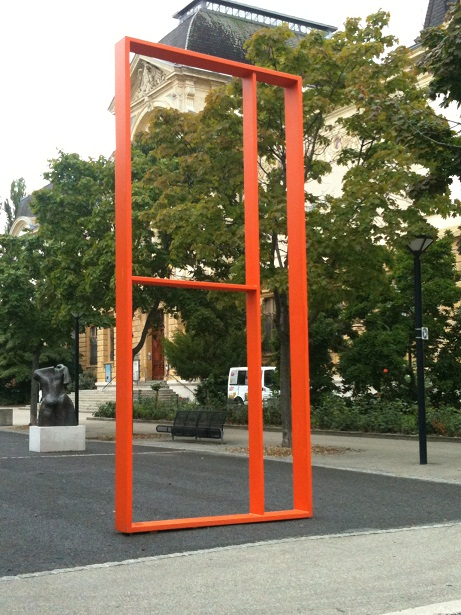
L'Horrible (2007), public sculpture in Neuchâtel, Switzerland.

Günther Förg (5 December 1952 – 5 December 2013) was a German painter, graphic designer, sculptor and photographer. His style was influenced by American abstract painting.

== Life ==
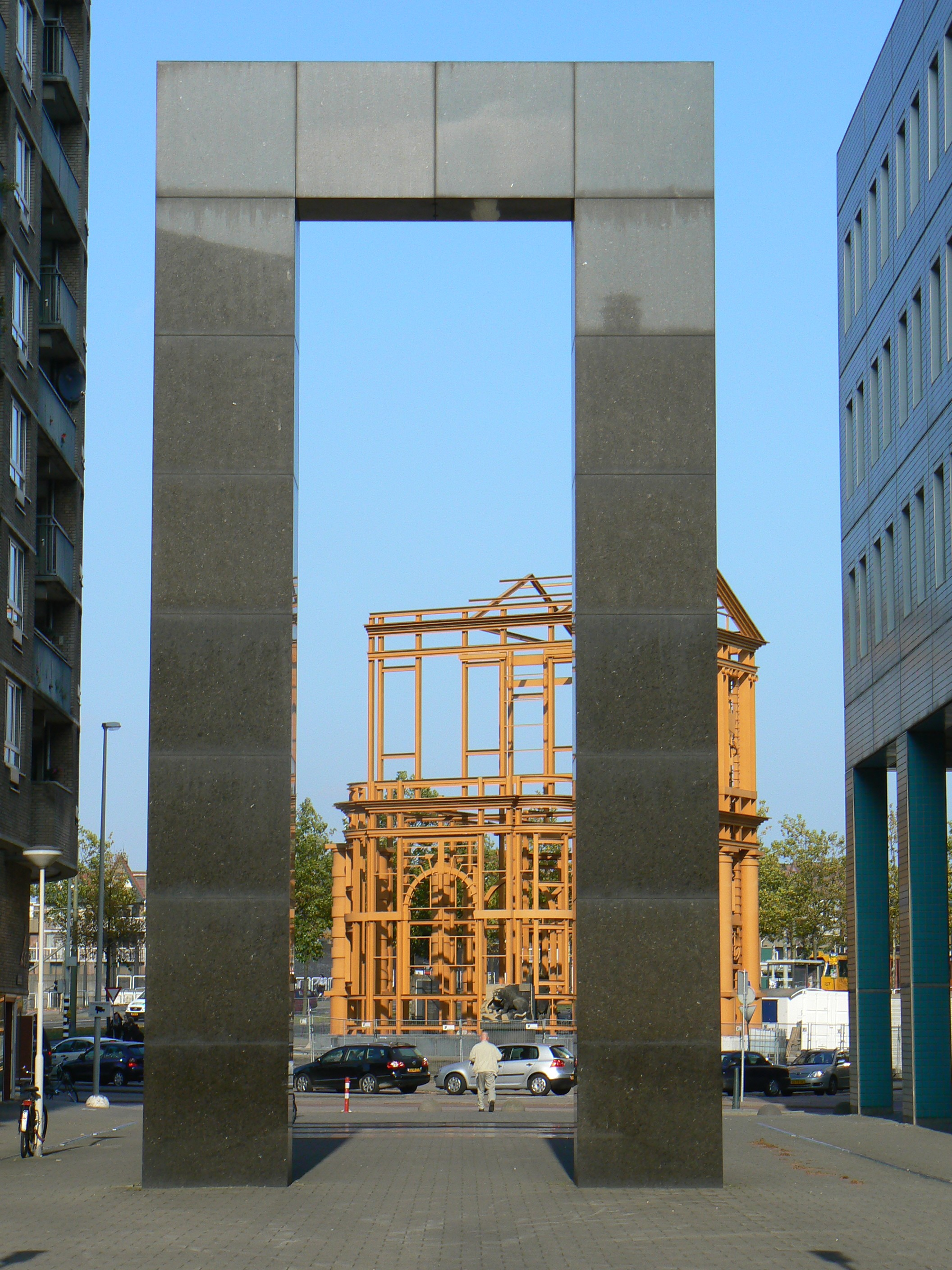
Gate and Stele (1994), public sculpture in Rotterdam, Netherlands

Förg was born in Füssen, Allgäu. His father, Michael, worked in a customs office. He studied from 1973 until 1979 at the Academy of Fine Arts in Munich with Karl Fred Dahmen. From 1992 until 1999, he taught at the Karlsruhe University of Arts and Design in Karlsruhe. From 1999 on he was a professor in Munich. He had a home in Areuse, Switzerland, as well as in Freiburg. In 1993 he married Ika Huber.

== Work ==
Untitled (1987) at the Museum of Modern Art

Förg's artistic oeuvre encompasses paintings, graphic and sculptural works as well as a great body of architectural photographs. His geometrical, abstract, and heavily dyed pictures have a strong decorative character. Förg combined materials and media in painting, sculpture and photography. The themes of his large scale architectural photographs are Bauhaus and fascist aesthetics, while his monochrome wall paintings and lead paintings are reflections on art.

Between 1973 (Förg's first year as a student at The Academy of Fine Art Munich) and 1976, Förg painted almost exclusively black monochrome canvas pictures in acrylic, which, with the addition of a translucent grey, produced a milky, veiled surface effect. After the death of his artistic colleague, Blinky Palermo, Förg pursued the latter's European legacy of American Minimal Art from 1977. Palermo has been quoted as saying, in reference to Förg, "the art is near as beautiful as the man". It is unclear whether this was meant as an insult or compliment. His paintings in abstract styles recall Cy Twombly, Ellsworth Kelly and others.

In the early 1980s, Förg made his so-called Alubilder – assemblages of aluminium sheeting onto which the artist had painted linear patterns or portrait photographs. For his series of paintings on lead, dating from the 1980s and 1990s, he wrapped lead sheets over wood, then painted each surface with acrylic.

Förg started using photography in his work at the beginning of the 1980s. In the area of photography he is known for his works from 1980–2006, primarily very large formats showing famous architectural sites such as the Wittgenstein House, Casa Malaparte, Casa del Fascio, and Hans Poelzig's IG Farben Building in Frankfurt. For this purpose he travelled extensively to Spain, Israel, Austria, Russia, France, Turkey and Italy where he primarily photographed Bauhaus buildings. Förg's photographic research using a 35 mm camera and zoom lenses presents the uncompromisingly modern architecture in an unembellished way, sometimes dilapidated, often featuring careless renovations or additions. His photographs of buildings with cultural and political significance — Bauhaus structures in Tel Aviv and Jerusalem, for example, or Fascist ones in Italy — were taken from unusual, sharp-angled perspectives, with off-center framing and often in grainy focus, suggestive of painting. Many of the photographs are views taken through windows that draw attention to transitions from interior to exterior space. The photographs are presented under thick protective glass reflecting the room and the viewer.

In 1988, as part of the Sculpture in the City exhibition, Förg installed two-metre-long walls of mirrors in a Rotterdam tube station; they were demolished in 1999.

Beginning in 1992, paintings and works on paper, known and documented in literature as "Gitterbilder" (grid paintings), appear in Förg's work. The roots for these pieces, however, are to be found in an earlier series, the so-called "Fenster-Aquarelle" (window watercolors): the crossbar forms a grid for the space in the image, which provides the frame for a whole flow of paintings without limiting their free display and development.

In 1991 for the opening of Frankfurt's Museum für Moderne Kunst, Förg produced a colorful wall piece for the central stairway, which together with a bronze relief formed a contrast to the architectural structure of the post-modern museum architecture. In 2000, he was commissioned with designs for Swiss Re's Centre for Global Dialogue in Zurich. For this project Forg handled the color design for all of the interiors in the 1920s Villa Bodmer and installed two enormous tubes of raw metal in its central entrance hall.

He died, aged 61, in Colombier, Neuchâtel, Switzerland.

== Exhibitions ==
Förg had his first solo exhibition at Rüdiger Schöttle Gallery, Munich, in 1980 with a series of monochrome paintings. In 1992, his work could be seen at the documenta IX, followed by an exhibition at the Stedelijk Museum in Amsterdam in 1995. Förg has had solo exhibitions at Essl Museum, Klosterneuburg, Austria, Langen Foundation, Neuss, Germany, Kunstmuseum Basel, Switzerland; Kunsthalle Bremen, Germany; Gemeentemuseum Den Haag, The Netherlands; Tel Aviv Museum of Art, Tel Aviv, Kunsthaus Bregenz, Bregenz, Austria, Museum der Stadt Füssen, Füssen, Germany, and Deutsche Guggenheim, Berlin, Germany.

== Art market ==
During his lifetime, Förg’s work was shown by Greene Naftali Gallery in New York; Almine Rech Gallery in New York, London, Paris, and Brussels; and Galerie Max Hetzler in Berlin. Since 2018, his estate has been exclusively represented by Hauser & Wirth.

The highest selling painting by the artist was Untitled (1990), which sold for £1,331,250 ($1,727,341) at Christie's, on 12 February 2020.

== Recognition ==
In 1996, Förg was awarded the Wolfgang Hahn Prize. He is mentioned in the book Art Now, vol. 3 , (Taschen Verlag, 2009) as being amongst the most interesting living contemporary artists. According to Artinvestor Magazine (2009), Förg ranked 23rd globally amongst then living artists when several factors are combined, such as collections, auction results and gallery representation.

== Gallery ==
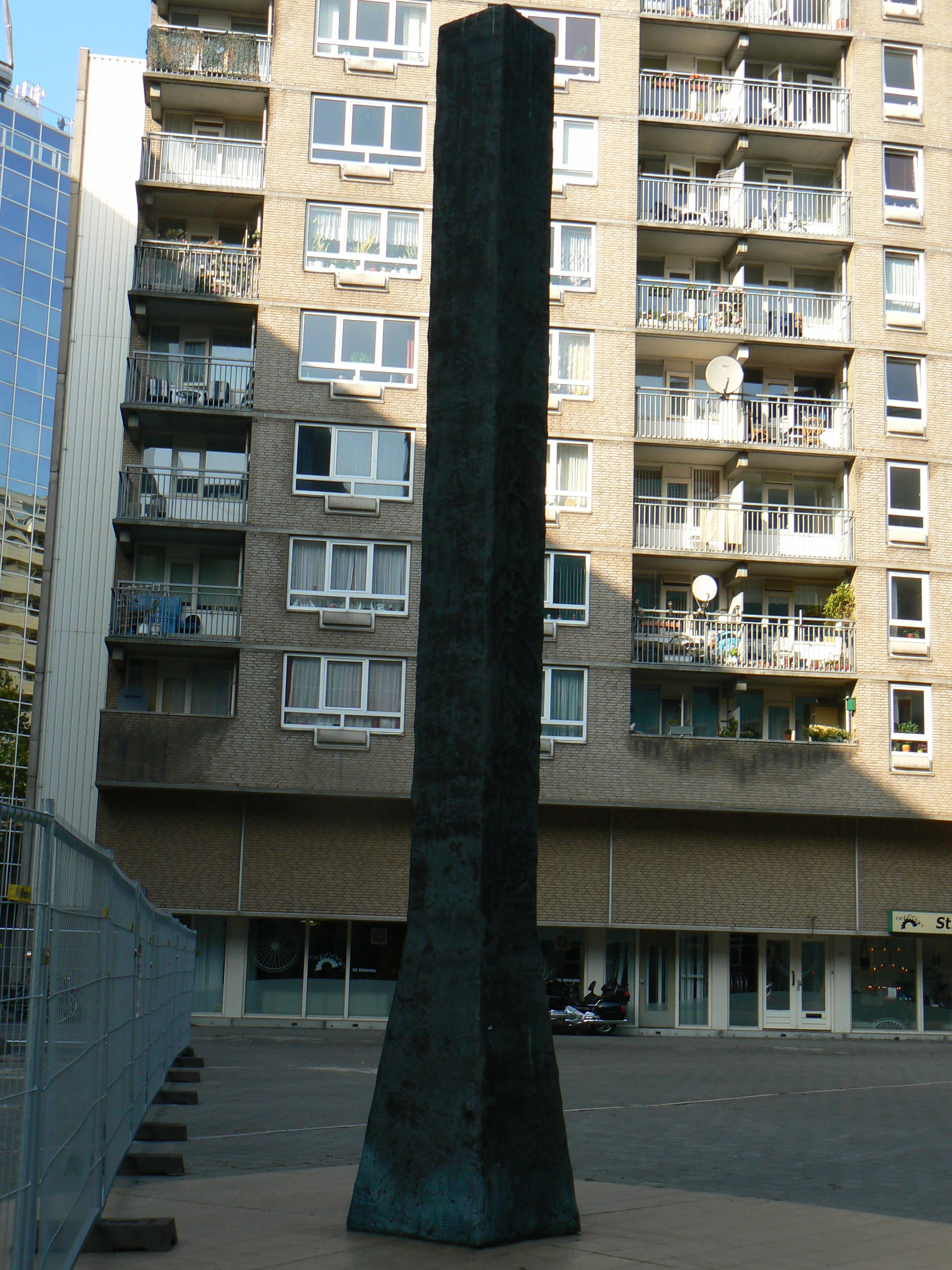
Stele (1994), Rotterdam

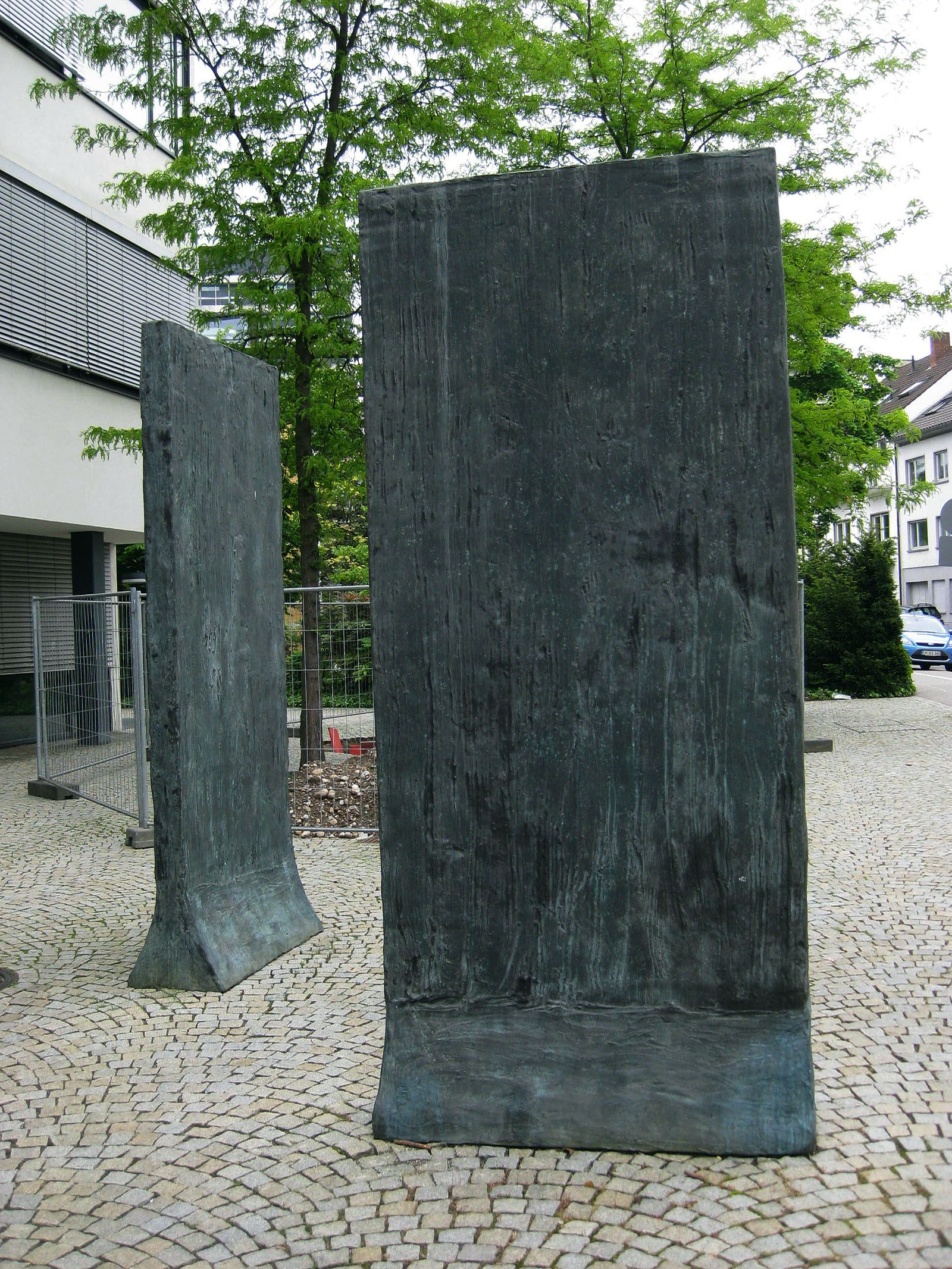
Ohne Titel (2000), Freiburg im Breisgau

== Public collections ==
Germany

- Pinakothek der Moderne, Munich
- Lenbachhaus, Munich
- Daimler Contemporary, Berlin
- Hamburger Bahnhof - Museum für Gegenwart, Berlin
- Sammlung Haubrok, Berlin
- Sammlung Hoffmann, Berlin
- Kunstmuseum Bonn, Bonn
- Kunstsammlungen Chemnitz, Chemnitz
- MKM Museum Küppersmühle für Moderne Kunst, Duisburg
- Kunstpalais Erlangen, Erlangen
- Kunstsammlung Deutsche Bundesbank, Frankfurt am Main
- Museum für Moderne Kunst (MMK), Frankfurt am Main
- Städel, Frankfurt/Main
- Zentrum für Kunst und Medientechnologie, Karlsruhe
- Museum Kurhaus Kleve
- Museum Ludwig, Cologne
- Galerie für Zeitgenössische Kunst GfZK, Leipzig
- Städtisches Museum Abteiberg, Mönchengladbach
- Kunstraum Grässlin, St. Georgen
- Städtische Galerie Wolfsburg

Austria

- Essl Museum, Klosterneuburg/Vienna

Canada

- AGO, Toronto
- National Gallery of Canada, Ottawa

The Netherlands

- Stedelijk Museum, Amsterdam

Switzerland

- Swiss Re, Zurich

United Kingdom

- Tate Modern, London

United States

- National Gallery of Art, Washington D.C.
- Art Institute of Chicago, Chicago, IL
- MOCA, Los Angeles, CA
- Museum of Modern Art, New York, NY
- Walker Art Center, Minneapolis, MN
- Mildred Lane Kemper Art Museum, Saint Louis, MO
- San Francisco Museum of Modern Art, San Francisco, CA
- J. Paul Getty Museum, Los Angeles, CA
- High Museum of Art, Atlanta, GA
- The Broad Art Foundation, Santa Monica, CA

Scandinavia

- Louisiana Museum of Modern Art, Humlebæk, Denmark
- Arken Museum of Modern Art, Ishøj, Denmark

== Auction record ==
Vente Masters - Art Moderne & Contemporain du 2 décembre 2020
