= Stele II =

Sculpture by Ellsworth Kelly

- Artist: Ellsworth Kelly
- Year: 1973
- Type: sculpture
- Dimensions: 3.20 m × 3.00 m (10 ft 6 in × 9 ft 10 in)
- Location: National Gallery of Art Sculpture Garden; Washington, D.C.; 38°53′29.51″N 77°1′20.42″W
- Owner: National Gallery of Art

Stele II is an abstract sculpture, constructed in 1973, by Ellsworth Kelly.

Located at the National Gallery of Art Sculpture Garden, it reflects the artist's move to the countryside, and landscape.

== See also ==
- List of public art in Washington, D.C., Ward 2
