= Joel Shapiro =

American sculptor (1941–2025)

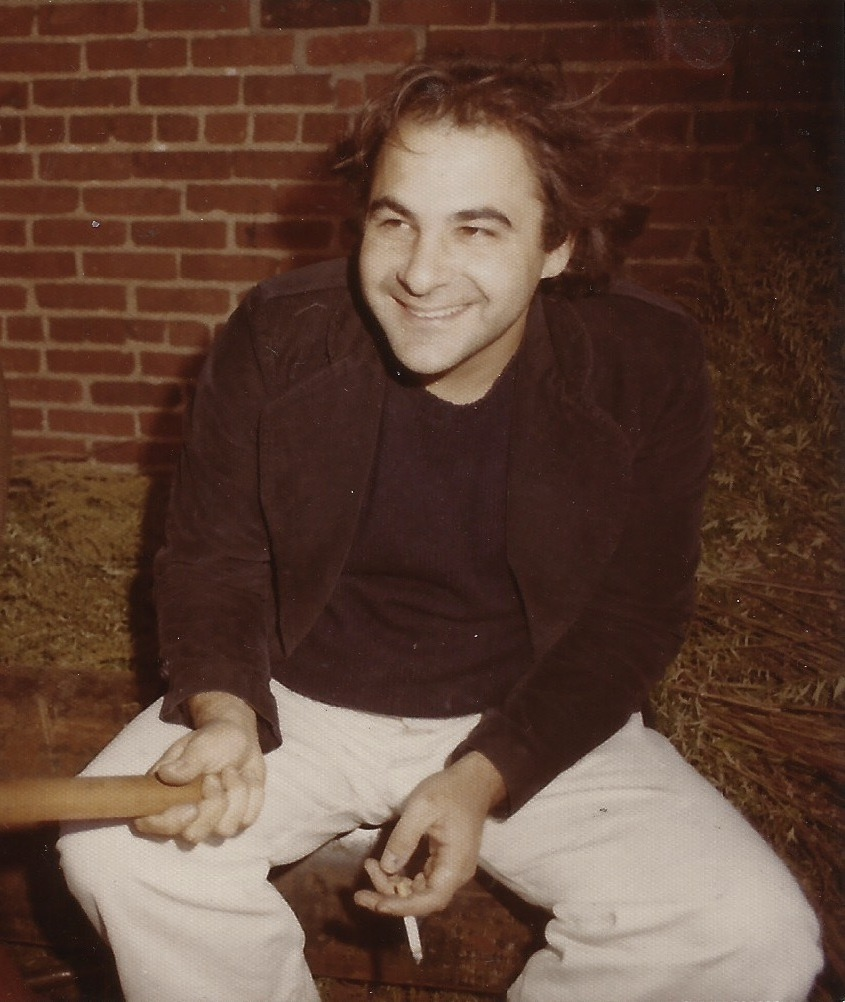
- Shapiro, c. 1973
- Born: September 27, 1941; New York City, U.S.
- Died: June 14, 2025 (aged 83); New York City, U.S.
- Occupation: Sculptor
- Organizations: Paula Cooper Gallery; Pace Gallery
- Known for: Loss and Regeneration
- Spouses: Amy Snider (sep. 1972) Ellen Phelan (m. 1978)
- Children: 1

Joel Elias Shapiro (September 27, 1941 – June 14, 2025) was an American sculptor. Classified by art critics as a postminimalist, his works consisted of sculptures composed of simple rectangular shapes. His sculptures were mostly defined through the materials used, without allusions to subjects outside of the works. His works are in major collections and public spaces in the United Space and abroad. Most of his creations are named Untitled. His 1993 Loss and Regeneration was created for the United States Holocaust Memorial Museum in Washington, D.C.

== Life and career ==
=== Early life and education ===
Shapiro was born on September 27, 1941, in New York City to a Jewish family and grew up in Sunnyside, Queens, New York. His father, Joseph Shapiro, was a physician who had an office in the basement of their house, and his mother, Anna née Lewis, was a microbiologist; both had studied at New York University. He grew up with a sister, Joan. His mother was a hobby artist who made clay figures. Growing up, he felt a love of art but a call to follow his father in medicine.

Shapiro graduated from Bayside High School in Bayside, New York in 1959, at which time the school's yearbook awarded him the title of Man About Town. He received a B.A. in 1964. At age 22, he lived in India for two years while in the Peace Corps. He said about the time: it "heightened my sense of the hugeness and variety of life in general, but also, the possibility of actually becoming an artist became very real to me for the first time". He received an M.A. in 1969 from New York University.

=== Career ===
Shapiro worked at the Jewish Museum, helping with exhibition installation and polishing silver objects of the collection. In 1969, he was featured in an exhibition of the Whitney Museum titled Anti-Illusion: Procedures/Materials, which formalized the Post-Minimalist art movement. He had his first solo exhibition in 1970 at the Paula Cooper Gallery in SoHo. There, he also showed tiny houses and chairs in cast iron and bronze, commenting in 2007: "I think they insisted on their own obdurate sense of self, in spite of the space surrounding but at the same time they're a part of it". The small objects surprised on the background of the "monumentality of Minimalism", and the forms compared to the mostly abstract sculpture at the time. Shapiro's works were exhibited in the first exhibition of the Clocktower Gallery in 1973, which became the P.S.1 Contemporary Art Center.

A retrospective of his work was held at the Whitney Museum in 1982. In 1992, Shapiro moved to the Pace Gallery. He had many solo exhibitions, in New York City, the United States and abroad.

In 2001, the Metropolitan Museum of Art installed 5 of his large bronze and painted aluminum sculptures in the Museum's Iris and B. Gerald Cantor Roof Garden.

=== Personal life and death ===
Shapiro lived and worked in New York City. Around the time of his first exhibition, he married the art educator Amy Snider, who founded a department for education in art and design at the Pratt Institute in Brooklyn. The couple had a daughter, Ivy, who became an art adviser. They separated in 1972, and Amy died in 2019. Shapiro married the artist Ellen Phelan in 1978. They lived in Long Island City where they had a spacious studio in a former electric substation.

Shapiro died of acute myeloid leukemia at a hospital in Manhattan, New York City, on June 14, 2025, at the age of 83.

== Work and inspiration ==
Untitled, bronze, 1990, Museum of Fine Arts, Houston

While in India serving in the Peace Corps, Shapiro saw many Indian art works; he experienced art in India as "pervasive and integral to the society", and he added: "the struggle in my work to find a structure that reflects real psychological states may well use Indian sculpture as a model". His early work, which also drew inspiration from Greek art, is characterized by some by its small size, but Shapiro has discounted this perception, describing his early works as "all about scale and the small size was an aspect of their scale". He described scale as "a very active thing that's changing and altering as time unfolds, consciously or unconsciously," and, "a relationship of size and an experience. You can have something small that has big scale." He said that in these works he was trying "to describe an emotional state, my own longing or desire". He also said that during this early period he was interested in the strategies of artists Robert Morris, Richard Serra, Carl Andre, and Donald Judd.

By the 1980s, Shapiro began to explore larger and life-size forms in pieces that were still reminiscent of Indian and Greek sculpture but also inspired by early modernist works by Edgar Degas and Constantin Brâncusi. The bulk of these pieces have been commissioned or acquired by museums and galleries. Later, Shapiro further expanded his repertoire by creating pieces that depicted the dynamism of human form. For instance, his subjects were portrayed in the act of dancing, crouching, and falling, among others that explored the themes of balance, cantilever, projection, and compression. His later works can have the appearance of flying, being impossibly suspended in space, and/or defying gravity. He said about this shift in his work that "[he] wanted to make work that stood on its own, and wasn't limited by architecture and by the ground and the wall and right angles." These can be demonstrated in the case of the large-size outdoor art he made for the Hood Museum of Art. The bronze piece was an attenuated form that leans over a walkway and its near-falling form is viewed as an energizing element in the museum's courtyard. This sculpture, like all of Shapiro's mature works, are untitled.

Shapiro was Jewish, and Jewish traditions influenced his art works, including his frequent use of the color blue. Shapiro's work has on occasion been compared to that of Alberto Giacometti, one of his favorite sculptors.

Most of Shapiro's works received no name and go by the title Untitled. The artist explained: "I'm not much of a poet. Form is its own language."

== Posthumous event ==
On September 2, 2026, U.S. President and Kennedy Center Chairman Donald Trump had Shapiro's 27-foot-high Blue (2019) disassembled and removed by the National Park Service from the grounds of the Kennedy Center in Washington, D.C.

== Works in collections ==
Shapiro's works in collections include:

=== United States ===
==== California ====
- Untitled, 1978, Museum of Contemporary Art San Diego, La Jolla
- Untitled, 1974, Gersh, Philip & Beatrice, Los Angeles
- Untitled, 1988, Gersh, Philip & Beatrice
- Untitled, 1981, Museum of Contemporary Art, Los Angeles
- Untitled, 1979, Museum of Contemporary Art
- Untitled, 1982, Museum of Contemporary Art
- Untitled, 1975, Museum of Contemporary Art
- Untitled, 1988, Fine Arts Museums of San Francisco, San Francisco
- Untitled, 1982–1985, J. Paul Getty Museum, Los Angeles

==== District of Columbia ====
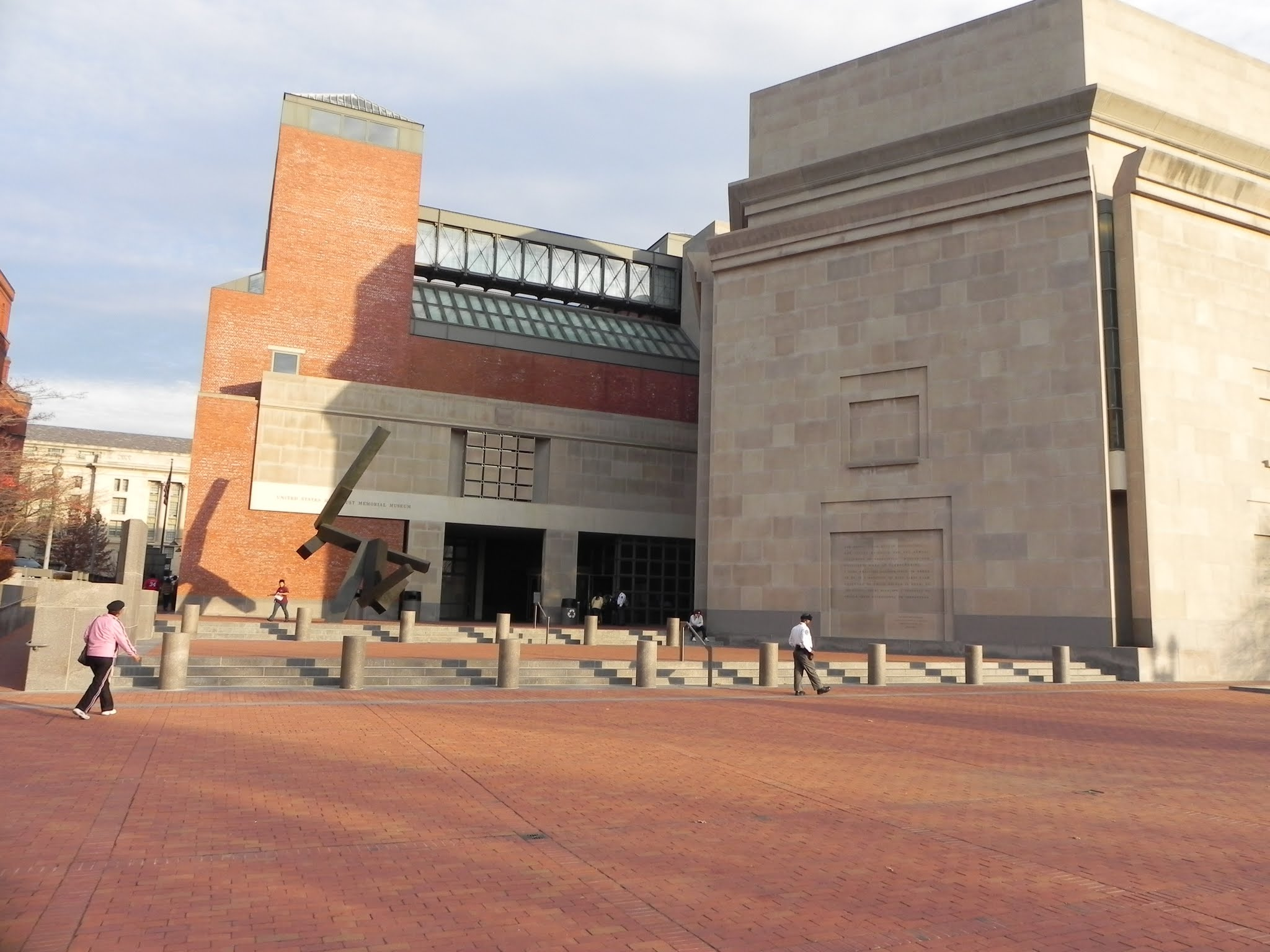
Loss and Regeneration, 1993, United States Holocaust Memorial Museum

- Untitled, 1989, National Gallery of Art, Washington
- Untitled, 1974, National Gallery of Art, Washington
- Untitled, 1975, National Gallery of Art
- Untitled, 1975, National Gallery of Art
- Untitled, 1983, National Gallery of Art
- Untitled, 1986, Hirshhorn Museum and Sculpture Garden, Washington
- Loss and Regeneration, 1993, United States Holocaust Memorial Museum, Washington

===== Previously displayed =====
- Blue, 2019, Video Wall Lawn of the REACH at the Kennedy Center, Washington, D.C.

==== Florida ====
- Untitled, 1996, Boca Raton Museum of Art
- Untitled, 1988, Boca Raton Museum of Art
- Up/Over, 2007, Norton Museum of Art, West Palm Beach

==== Illinois ====
- Untitled, 1984, Elliott, Gerald S., Chicago
- Untitled (Arching Figure), 1985, Elliott, Gerald S.
- Untitled (for G.S.E.), 1987, Elliott, Gerald S.
- Untitled, 1981, Governors State University, University Park

==== Indiana ====
- Untitled, 1984, David Owsley Museum of Art, Indiana

==== Iowa ====
- Untitled, 2003, Principal Riverwalk, Des Moines
- Untitled, 1985, Pappajohn Sculpture Park, Des Moines

==== Maine ====
- Untitled, 1984, Colby College Museum of Art, Waterville

==== Maryland ====
- Untitled, 1985, Baltimore Museum of Art
- Untitled, 1970, Baltimore Museum of Art

==== Massachusetts ====
- Untitled, 1990, Fogg Art Museum, Harvard University, Cambridge
- Untitled, 1997, Museum of Fine Arts, Boston

==== Michigan ====
- Untitled, 1975, Detroit Institute of Arts, Detroit
- Untitled, 1985, Detroit Institute of Arts, Detroit
- Untitled, 1985, Frederik Meijer Gardens & Sculpture Park, Grand Rapids

==== Minnesota ====
- Untitled, 1975, Minneapolis Institute of Art, Minneapolis

==== Missouri ====
- Untitled, 1984, Saint Louis Art Museum, St. Louis
- Untitled, 1991, Nelson-Atkins Museum of Art, Kansas City

==== Nebraska ====
- Untitled, 1984, University of Nebraska-Lincoln, Sheldon Museum of Art
- Untitled, 1989, Joslyn Art Museum

==== New York ====
- Seven Elements, 2001–2003, Albany Institute of History & Art, Albany
- Untitled, 1988, Museum of Modern Art, New York City
- Untitled, 1988, Museum of Modern Art
- Untitled (house on shelf), 1974, Museum of Modern Art, NYC
- Untitled, 1994, Sony Plaza, New York City – donated by Sony Corporation of America to Storm King Art Center on April 19, 2016
- Untitled (House on Field), 1976, Whitney Museum, New York City
- Untitled, 1978, Whitney Museum
- Untitled, 1981, Whitney Museum
- Untitled, 2000, Rockefeller University
- Untitled, 2004–2005, Albany Academy for Girls, Albany

==== North Carolina ====
- Untitled, 1990, North Carolina Museum of Art
- Untitled, 1995, Davidson College, Van Every/Smith Galleries

==== Ohio ====
- Untitled, University of Cincinnati Galleries
- Untitled, 1977, Cincinnati Art Museum
- Untitled, 1989, Cleveland Museum of Art

==== Pennsylvania ====
- Untitled maquette, 1984, CIGNA Museum and Art Collection, Philadelphia
- Untitled, 1984, CIGNA Museum and Art Collection

==== Texas ====
- Untitled, 1975, Dallas Museum of Art
- Untitled, 1975, Nasher Sculpture Center, Dallas
- Untitled, 1984, Nasher Sculpture Center
- Untitled, 1985–87, Nasher Sculpture Center
- Untitled, 1986, Nasher Sculpture Center
- Untitled, 1986, Nasher Sculpture Center
- Untitled, 1996–99, Nasher Sculpture Center
- Untitled, 1977, Modern Art Museum of Fort Worth
- Untitled, 1977, Modern Art Museum of Fort Worth
- Untitled, 1990, Museum of Fine Arts, Houston
- Untitled, 2000, McNay Art Museum, San Antonio
- "Elements", 2004–2005, Northpark Center, Dallas
- Untitled, 2011, Rice University Art Gallery, Houston
- Untitled, 2019, University of Texas Southwestern Medical Center, Dallas

==== Washington ====
- Untitled, 1980–81, Western Washington University Public Sculpture Collection, Bellingham
- Untitled, 1980–81, Restricted Owner, Seattle
- Untitled, 1990, Seattle University campus

==== Wisconsin ====
- Untitled, 1987, Milwaukee Art Museum, Milwaukee, Wisconsin

=== International collections ===
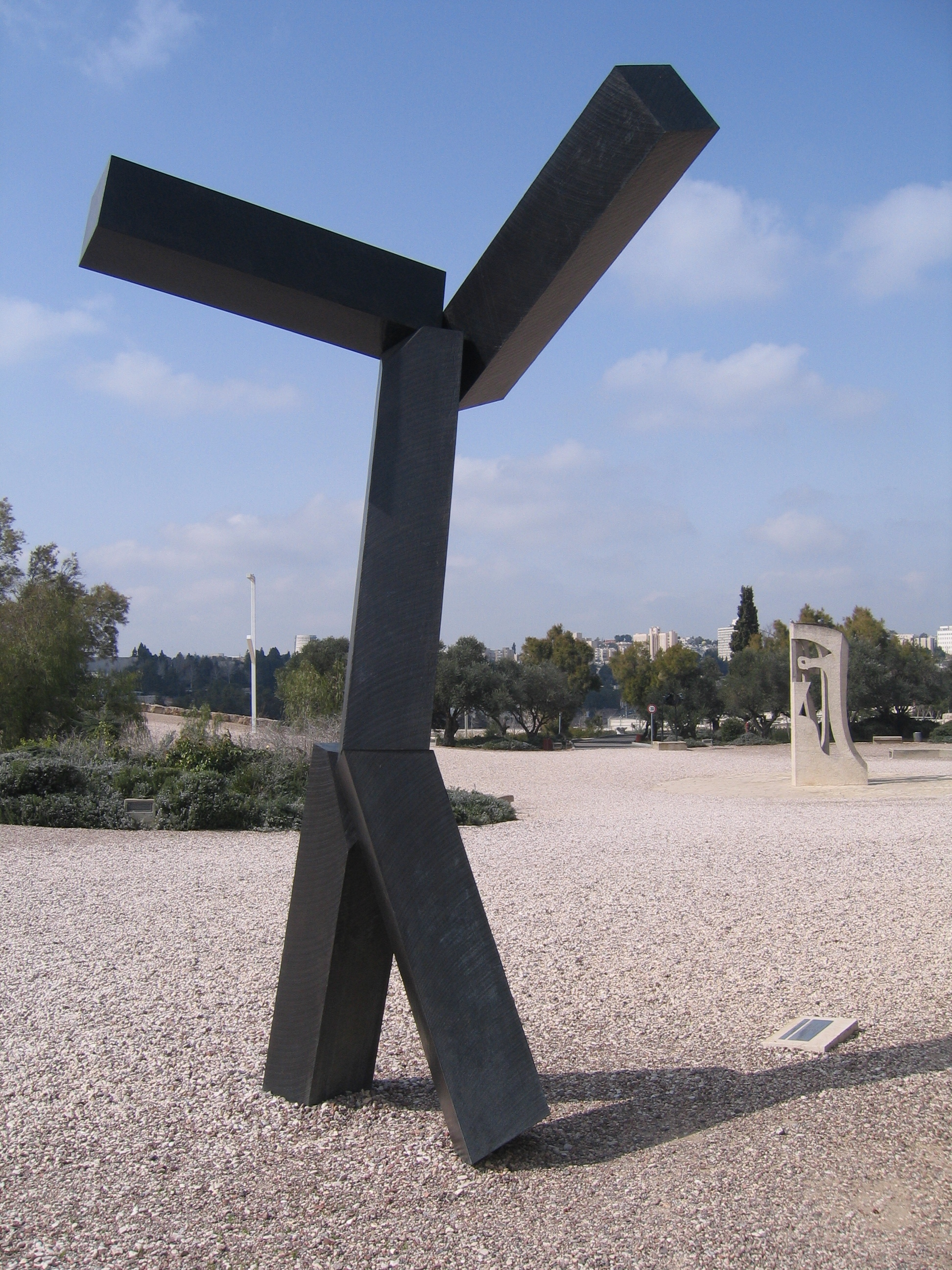
Untitled, Israel Museum, Jerusalem

==== Australia ====
- Untitled (chair), 1974, National Gallery of Australia, Canberra

==== Canada ====
- Conjunction, 1999, Embassy of the United States of America, Ottawa

==== Denmark ====
- Louisiana Museum of Modern Art, Humlebaek (note: Joel Shapiro's sculpture name is unknown in the Denmark section, so the name of the sculpture is not known.)

==== Germany ====
- Ohne Titel (1994) in front of Quartier 205, Berlin
- Untitled, 1996/1999, Skulpturen Park Köln, Cologne

==== Israel ====
- Untitled, 1991, Tel Aviv Museum of Art, Tel Aviv
- Untitled, 1996, Billy Rose Art Garden, Israel Museum, Jerusalem

==== Italy ====
- Untitled, 1993, Peggy Guggenheim Collection, Venice

==== Netherlands ====
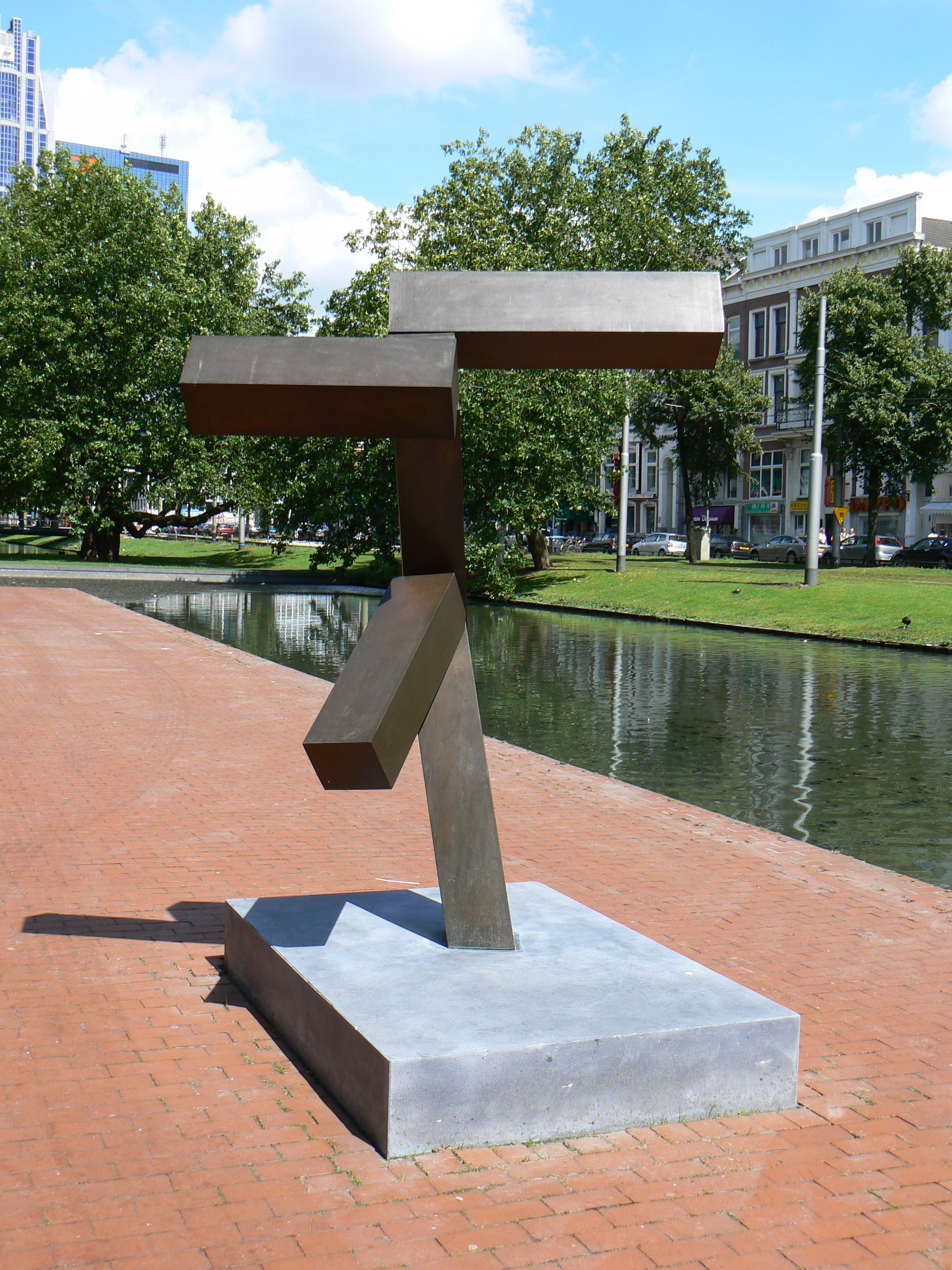
Untitled, Rotterdam

- Untitled, 1999, Westersingel sculpture trail, Rotterdam

==== Sweden ====
- Untitled, 1979, Moderna Museet, Stockholm
- Untitled, 1982, Moderna Museet

==== United Kingdom ====
- Untitled, 1978, Tate, London
- Untitled, 1984, Tate

== Awards ==
Shapiro became a member of the Royal Swedish Academy of Fine Arts in 1994, of the American Academy of Arts and Letters in 1998, and of the National Academy of Design in 2012.

His other awards included:

- 1975 Visual Arts Fellowship of the National Endowment for the Arts
- 1984 Brandeis University Creative Arts Award
- 1986 Skowhegan Medal for Sculpture
- 2015 Lifetime achievement award from the International Sculpture Center
