= Ellen Phelan =

American painter

- Born: 1943 (age 82–83); Detroit, Michigan, U.S.
- Education: Wayne State University
- Known for: Painting
- Spouse: Joel Shapiro (m. 1978; died 2025)

Ellen Phelan (born 1943) is an American artist known especially as a painter of formalist abstractions, psychologically charged scenes enacted by dolls, and landscapes.

== Background and education ==
Phelan was born in 1943 and raised in Detroit, Michigan. Her father was a Canadian immigrant who had once planned to become a priest. She has called herself a "Catholic girl". She received her B.A. and M.F.A. degrees from Wayne State University, Phelan worked as a substitute teacher in the Detroit public school system and worked in the Detroit Institute of Arts as an assistant to curator Sam Wagstaff. She also worked with a group of Detroit artists to establish the cooperative Willis Gallery. Phelan relocated to New York City in 1973. From 1995 to 2000, Phelan coordinated the overhaul of the Visual and Environmental Studies program at Harvard University.

== Career ==
Phelan's work is included in the collections of Museum of Modern Art and the Whitney Museum. Her early work from the early 1970s and before contrasts greatly from her work from the mid-1970s going forward. Of this shift, Phong Bui notes, "during the mid-1970s, when she turned away from process art in favor of plein-air landscape painting, which she began in the Adirondacks in the summer of 1976, it was a decisive turn, and it enhanced her natural touch as a painter." The New York Times art critic Ken Johnson wrote, "Ellen Phelan has painted her way through a number of phases over the last three decades, from formalist abstractions to psychologically fraught portraits of antique dolls to meditative still lifes to the pastoral landscapes that this show comprises. What has remained consistent, besides an always assiduous care for the craft of painting, has been the Modernist tension between material surface and illusory depth and a postmodernist play between romance and irony."

In an interview with Phong Bui, in The Brooklyn Rail, Phelan says of her Fan pieces: "Most of them thought they were sculpture, but I saw them as paintings. For me it was a way of stretching painting. By working with irregular perimeters, I felt it was a continuation of the earlier things I was doing, which involved cutting and tearing, folding, collaging the fabric, then painting on both sides. The only difference is that the Fan pieces were painted only on one side, and they were more involved with the shallow space of Cubism."

== Personal ==
Phelan was married to sculptor Joel Shapiro until his death in 2025.
