= Mauro Staccioli =

Italian sculptor

- Born: 11 February 1937; Volterra, Italy
- Died: 1 January 2018 (aged 80); Milan, Italy
- Occupation: Sculptor

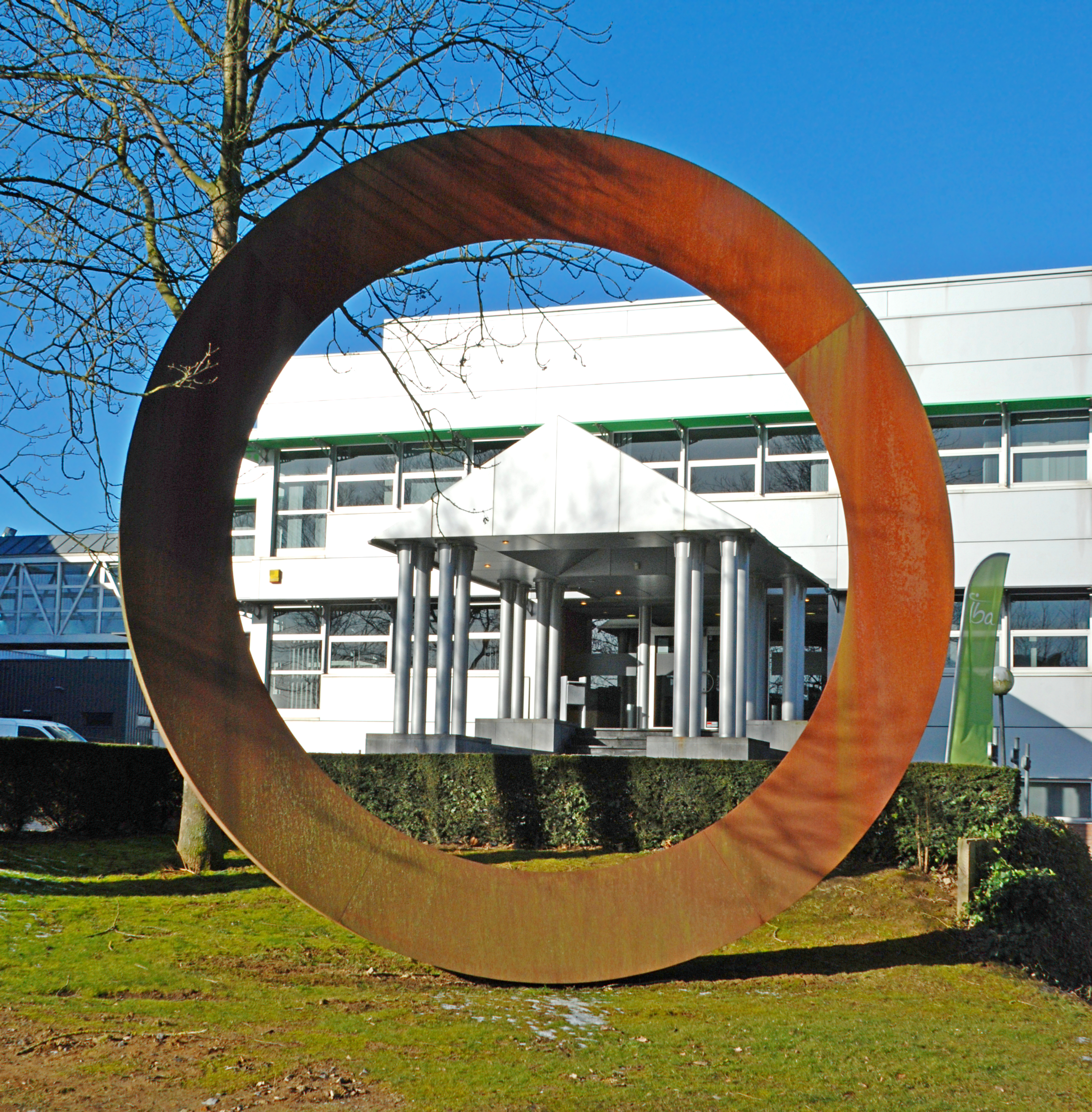
Anneau by Mauro Staccioli, Louvain-la-Neuve, Belgium

Mauro Staccioli (11 February 1937 – 1 January 2018) was an Italian sculptor.

== Career ==
After studying at the Art Institute in Volterra, Staccioli started teaching and in 1968 joined the Academy of Fine Arts of Brera in Milan.

At the end of the 1960s, Staccioli decided to dedicate himself to sculpture. His idea is to meet people where they live which leads him to create sculptures for urban places. His sculptures are “marks”, traces of a passage; he wants to affect the people who are usually found in a place and prompt them to experience that place in a different way. His sculptures always have a strong relationship with the place where he works.

Since the beginning of the 1970s, he has chosen urban environment and, with sculpture, tries to give answers to social questions. His linguistic choice is characterized by the coherence, the essential shapes and by the perfect adherence to the setting where he realize his “sculpture-intervention”. He proceeds in a very rigorous way, studying the history and characteristics of the places where he is called to work. With his sculptures he marks the place, transforming the usual perception of the people who come across them.

== Permanently displayed works ==
Among his permanent installations: Villa Celle in Santomato of Pistoia (1982); Olympic Park in Seoul (1988); Djerassi Foundation in Woodside (1987–1991); Museum of Contemporary Art of Seul Kwachon (1990); Museum of Contemporary Art of San Diego (1996); Ordino d’Arcalis in Andorra (1991); Munich (1996); Parc Tournay-Solvay in Brussels (1996); Villa Glori in Roma (1997); Schuman roundabout in Brussels (1998); Lapiz building in La Jolla (2003); Chiaopanshan International Sculpture Park in Taiwan (2003); University of Puerto Rico Arecibo (2004); Carrazeda de Ansiães in Portugal (2008); Centre Val St Quentin in Voisins-le-Bretonneux (2008).

== Death ==
Staccioli died of pneumonia on January 1, 2018. He was 80 years old.
