= Dirk Skreber =

German painter

Dirk Skreber's Untitled (Train) (courtesy Frank Cohen Collection)

Dirk Skreber (born 1961) is a German artist who lives and works in New York City.

Skreber's work has been exhibited at galleries including The Saatchi Collection, the Petzel Gallery, and the Milwaukee Art Museum. In 2000, he won the Preis der Nationalgalerie für junge Kunst.

Reviewing a 2009 exhibition of his car crash sculptures-- produced at an automotive safety testing facility--a critic from The New York Times described them as "arresting" and suggesting "a Faustian industrialism driven by consumerist desire on a collision course with death."
