= Simon Ungers =

German architect and artist

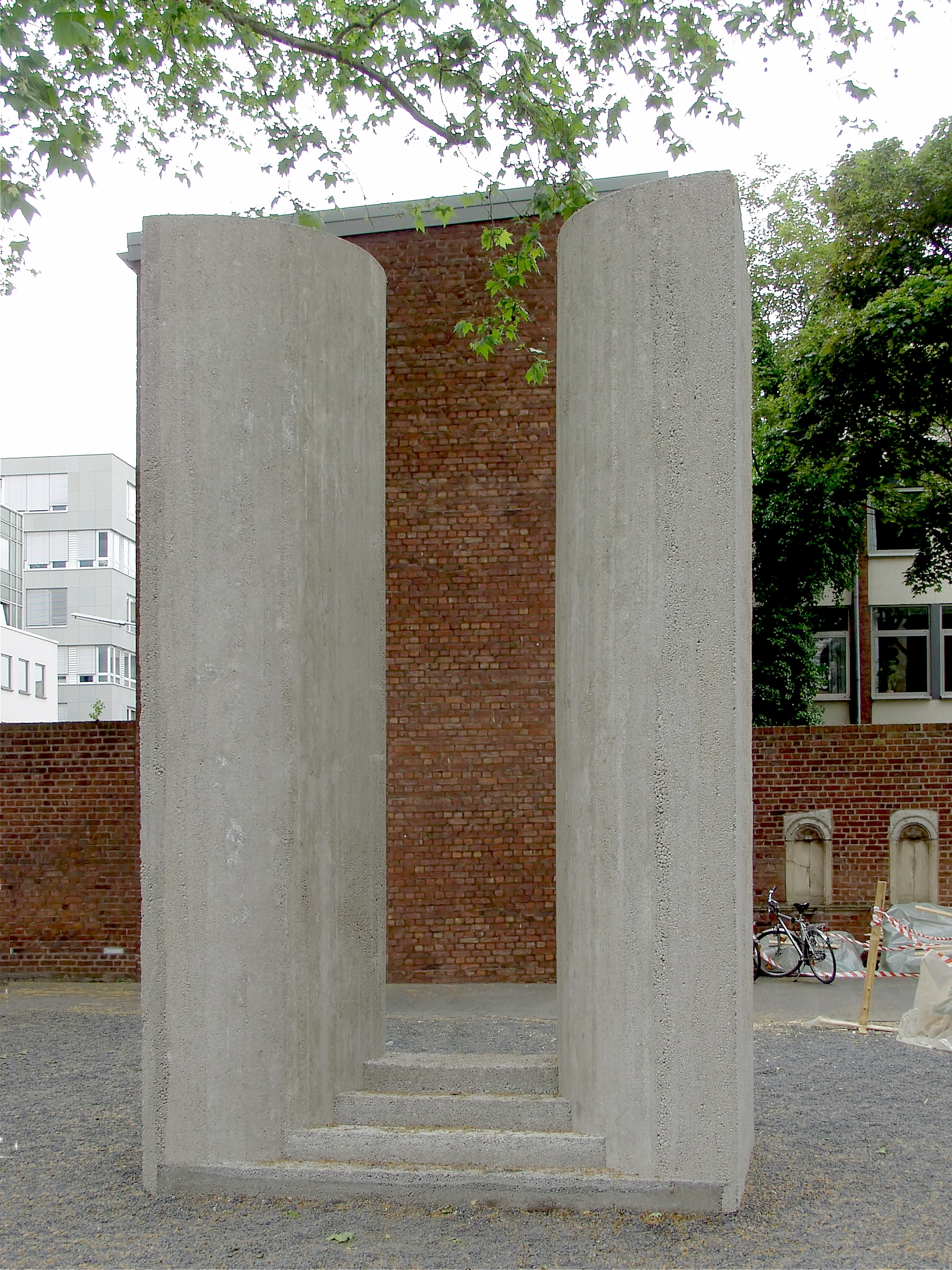
"Forum" - in front of the church St. Peter (Cologne)

Simon Ungers (8 May 1957 – 6 March 2006) was a German architect and artist.

Simon Ungers was born in 1957 in Cologne, the son of the architect Oswald Mathias Ungers and Liselotte Gabler. In 1969, his family moved to the United States. From 1975 to 1980, he studied architecture at Cornell University in Ithaca, New York.

Ungers worked in New York and Cologne. He gained attention together with Tom Kinslow for the construction of T-House, a home made of Cor-ten in Wilton, New York. He also designed the Cube House in Ithaca, New York.

In 1995, he was one of two first-prize winners in a competition to design the Holocaust Memorial in Berlin, but in a tie-breaker vote his design was not selected. Later neither of the two winning designs was chosen, but a new competition was held.

Ungers taught at Harvard University, Syracuse University, Rensselaer Polytechnic Institute, Cornell University and University of Maryland, College Park.

Ungers died after a long illness in Hürth, Germany on 6 March 2006 at the age of 48. He is survived by his wife Janet O'Hair.
