= Scott Burton =

American artist and writer (1939–1989)

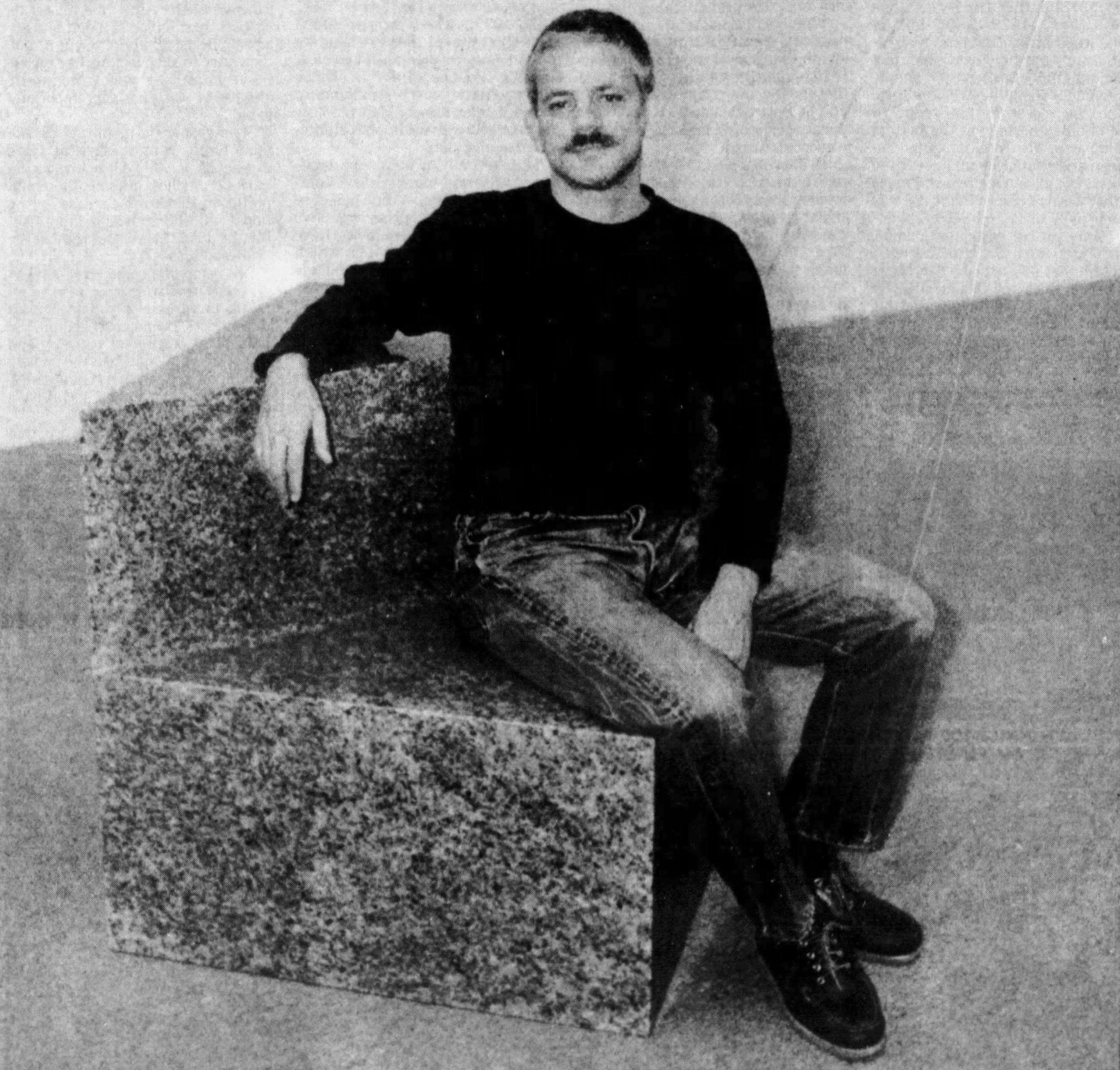
- Burton in 1986
- Born: Walter Scott Burton III; June 23, 1939; Greensboro, Alabama, United States
- Died: December 29, 1989 (aged 50); New York City, United States
- Education: Columbia University (BA); New York University (MA)
- Known for: Sculpture, performance, art criticism

Walter Scott Burton III (June 23, 1939 – December 29, 1989) was an American artist and writer who primarily worked in sculpture and performance art. He was best known for his large-scale furniture sculptures in materials like granite and bronze, often made as public art.

Born in Alabama, Burton moved as a child to Washington, D.C., and began studying under a series of notable painters while still in high school. After graduating from university in New York City, Burton began his career as a writer, primarily making works for the stage. He moved on to art criticism in the mid-1960s, working for the magazines ARTnews and Art in America as an editor and critic. At the end of the decade, Burton started making performance pieces, often focusing on the relationships between performers' bodies, and he quickly integrated furniture and sculptures into his performances. Sculpture, particularly sculptures that functioned as furniture objects, became his primary focus by the mid-late 1970s. His late career was defined by furniture sculptures and landscapes built as public art, including for public parks, plazas, and government spaces, as well as for corporate buildings.

== Early life and education ==
Walter Scott Burton III was born on June 23, 1939, in Greensboro, Alabama, the son of Walter Scott Burton Jr. and Hortense Mobley Burton. Burton was born premature and underweight, facing significant health challenges as an infant. His father was an oil well driller whom Burton called a "roughneck" and was largely absent from his life, and his mother was a social and legal secretary. His parents separated early in his childhood and Burton relocated to Washington, D.C., with his mother in 1952, where his uncle was working as a correspondent for Knight Newspapers. Burton's mother raised him as a single parent while working several administrative jobs for the federal government. Around the time they moved to Washington, at age twelve, Burton came out to his mother as gay. The family lived at first in Burton's uncle's home in Georgetown before moving into their own house in Washington's Glover Park neighborhood. Of his time in Alabama, Burton said as an adult that "I'm a Southerner, but I don't identify with it."

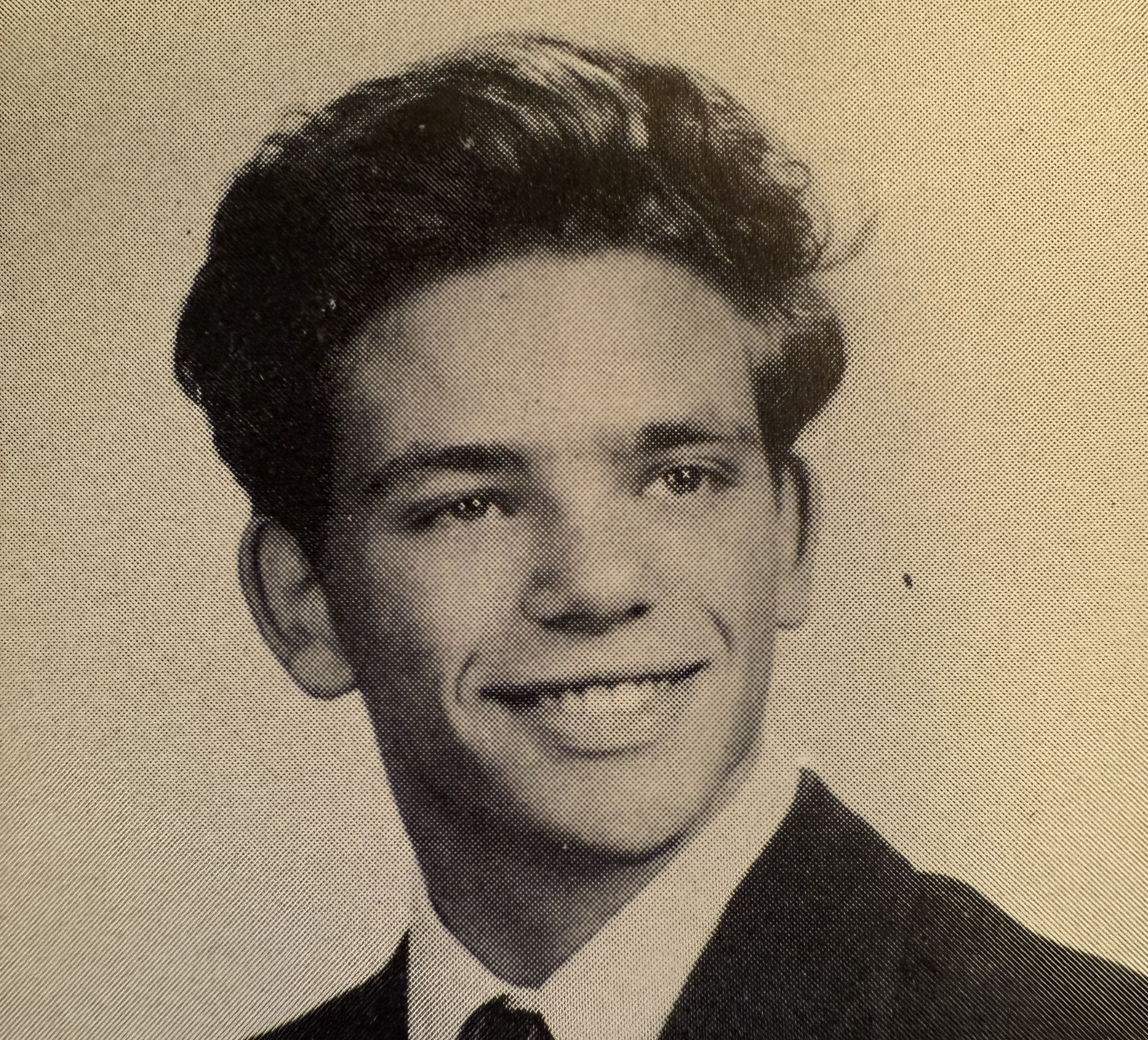
Burton in 1957, photographed during his senior year for the Western High School yearbook

Burton attended Western High School in Washington. At the age of fourteen or fifteen, he began taking art classes after school at both the Corcoran School and the Washington Workshop Center for the Arts, his first experiences making art. Among his teachers at the Workshop Center was painter Morris Louis, and Burton felt the classes were too advanced or sophisticated for him at first. The director of the Workshop Center, painter Leon Berkowitz, soon became Burton's high school art teacher, and Burton became very close with Berkowitz and his wife, poet Ida Fox. In addition to teaching Burton in school, Berkowitz introduced him to important movements and figures from recent art history, including the Washington Color School, artist Willem de Kooning, and critic Clement Greenberg. Burton often spent time visiting the National Gallery of Art and The Phillips Collection in Washington and he expressed a love of the Neoclassical architecture in the city.

Berkowitz also arranged for Burton to travel to Provincetown, Massachusetts, to study under painter Hans Hofmann three summers in a row, beginning in 1957. Burton's first summer in Massachusetts was also his first time being away from home. Although he was in Provincetown to learn art from Hofmann, Burton later said that the town itself, which was becoming known for tolerating and welcoming gay visitors, had taught him "a great deal more [...] about life—and about art", than his teacher had. Also in 1957, at eighteen, Burton began his first long-term romantic relationship with the dancer and choreographer Jerome Robbins, who was twenty-one years older than Burton; their relationship was primarily long–distance at first.

After his first summer in Provincetown, Burton enrolled at the experimental Goddard College in Vermont, where he took advantage of the school's open curriculum to study writing about the gay experience. Finding the school too small, he left after two years to return home to Washington, taking classes at George Washington University. Some time after returning home, he sent a series of his poems to professor Lionel Trilling at Columbia University in New York, who was so impressed he insisted the school admit Burton on a scholarship. He spent a portion of the summer of 1959 taking literature classes at Harvard Summer School before enrolling at Columbia in the fall, intending to follow the path of his uncle by studying literature. After his last summer in Massachusetts studying under Hofmann, Burton gave up drawing and painting completely, focusing his energy entirely on writing. Burton and Robbins briefly moved in together in New York in 1961. They ended their partnership that fall when Burton met artist John Button and began a relationship with him.

Burton graduated magna cum laude from Columbia in 1962. He completed a master's degree in English literature at New York University in 1963, funded by a Woodrow Wilson Fellowship for dramatic literature. He stayed in the city after graduation in order to begin a writing career.

== Life and career ==
=== 1963–1969: Early writing career, art criticism, first performances ===
Beginning his career as a writer, Burton first wanted to be a playwright and poet. Through his relationship with Button, he was connected to the social networks of the creative community in New York, including the city's theater scene. He came to meet, among others, Edward Albee, Alex Katz, Lincoln Kirstein, and Frank O'Hara, and Button introduced him to a number of other gay artists and writers working in the city. He also held a number of jobs in New York to support himself after finishing his graduate degree, including at the reception desk and bookstore of the Museum of Modern Art beginning in 1963 and as a reader at Sterling Lord's literary agency from 1964 to 1965.

Burton wrote several plays in the early 1960s, including The Eagle and the Lamb, based on the myth of Ganymede, and Saint George, a play commissioned by Kirstein in 1964 for the American Shakespeare Theatre, though he was largely unsuccessful. Burton later called his early plays and poems "terrible". His most important early theater work from this time period was the libretto for Shadow'd Ground, an experimental ballet choreographed by John Taras and set to a composition by Aaron Copland. Burton was tasked with writing the story for the ballet and chose 140 still images to project onto screens behind the dancers, creating a visual narrative during the piece. Burton's work in Shadow'd Ground received sharply negative reviews; critic Allen Hughes called it "naively derivative, sentimental and pretentious." Despite the negative feedback, Burton said the experience was extremely important: "It was the first entrance of story without words into my life, and it changed everything."

In spring 1965, Burton published his first substantial work of art criticism, in the magazine Art and Literature. In November 1965, Burton joined ARTnews magazine as an editorial associate under Thomas B. Hess, writing short, often unsigned reviews for the publication, his first foray into art criticism. His first feature-length article for the magazine, in 1966, focused on the work of sculptor Tony Smith. He wrote a substantial amount of criticism in the late 1960s both in his role at the magazine and in other publications, including the introduction text for the postminimalism-focused exhibition Live In Your Head: When Attitudes Become Form at the Kunsthalle Bern in 1969.

In 1968, Button began an affair with a student and broke up with Burton, leading Burton to build more of his own connections and relationships through his art criticism. Burton began exploring the leather and BDSM communities in New York in the late 1960s, increasingly so after his relationship ended with Button.

During this period, Burton built relationships with performance artists and poets like John Perreault, assisting with poetry events at artist Robert Rauschenberg's home in 1968. Burton first began making performance art himself in 1969 as part of the event series Street Works, organized by Perreault, Marjorie Strider, Hannah Weiner, and others. The organizers invited artists to perform works in a designated location in Manhattan during a specific time period, the first of which was 24 hours. Burton was one of the only art critics invited to participate in the first event and his contribution involved viewers picking up a random piece of trash from the street that Burton would put in a plastic bag with a piece of paper that read "Schwitters", a reference to the German Dadaist artist Kurt Schwitters, whose own work was often made from found trash. Burton also assisted with his friend Eduardo Costa's performance Useful Art Works at the first event.

Burton participated in each of the first four Street Works events held in Manhattan in 1969. Some of his other performances for Street Works that year involved, variously: cross-dressing as a woman to disguise himself from the viewers; walking naked on Lispenard Street in Soho at midnight; and drugging himself to fall asleep at a reception for the event. Written documentation of Street Works, including Burton's work, was published in 1969 in 0 to 9, an avant-garde magazine focused on experimentation with language and image-making published by artists Vito Acconci and Bernadette Mayer, participants in the events. Burton eventually came to refer to his performances for Street Works, along with other related performances, as his Self-Works.

While he was not present on the first night of the Stonewall riots in New York in June 1969, Burton saw the aftermath of the police response early the next morning and joined the second night of demonstrations against police violence toward LGBT people.

=== 1970–1979: Expanded performance work, move toward sculpture ===
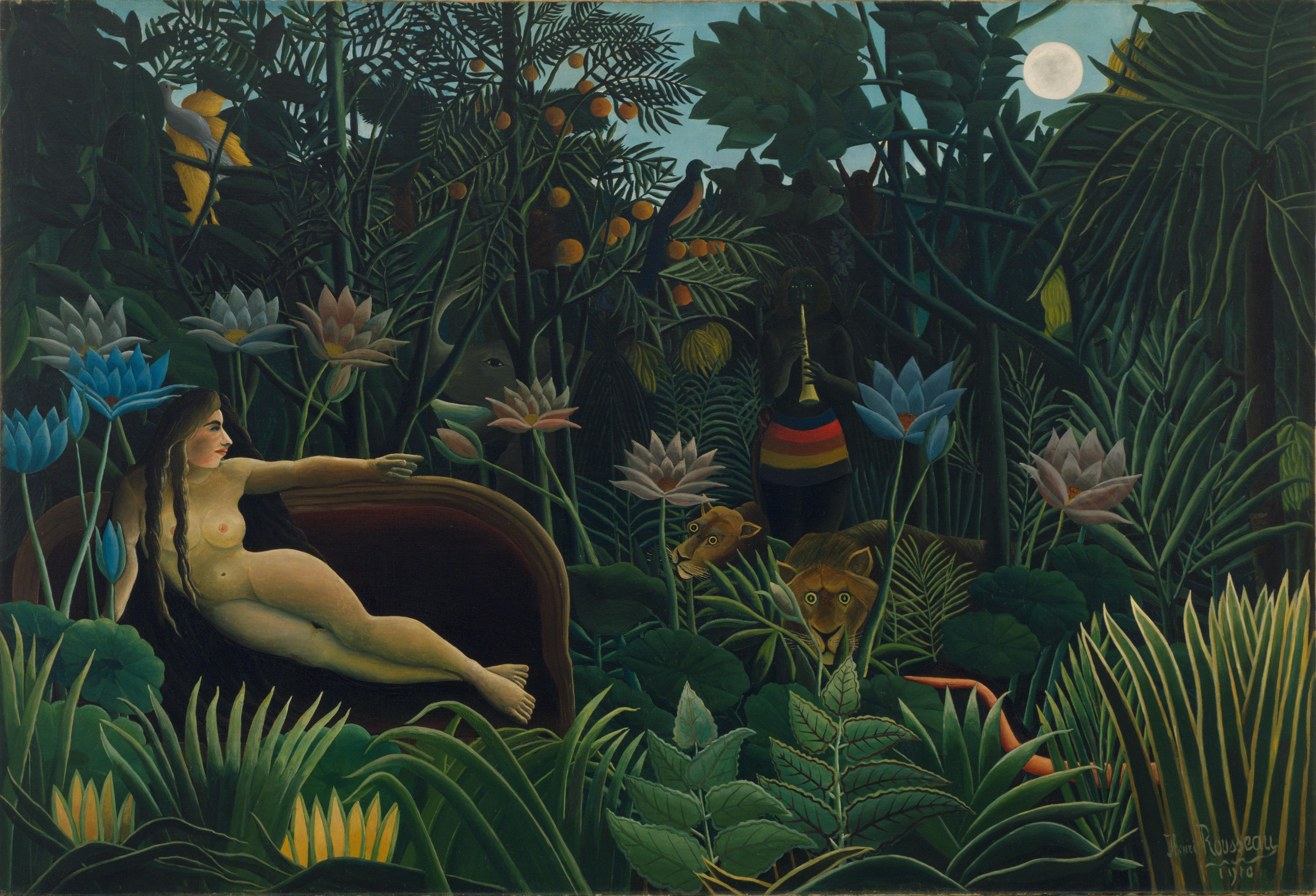
Henri Rousseau's painting The Dream (1910), the visual inspiration for Burton's Furniture Landscape, his first work to involve furniture

In 1970, Burton traveled to the University of Iowa with Strider to be guest teachers, organizing a lecture and performance series for the students. Among the students in Iowa who attended Burton's lecture and performances were artists Ana Mendieta and Sandy Skoglund. Burton performed the first of his Tableaux pieces, Ten Tableaux, and built an outdoor installation of found objects titled Furniture Landscape, his first use of furniture in his work. Inspired by Henri Rousseau's painting The Dream, Burton's Furniture Landscape consisted of a series of room-like installations of heavily used found furniture and domestic decor, arranged amidst dense foliage in a forested area of the school's campus.

Burton's Tableaux performances, often considered his most well–known performance pieces, consisted of usually male performers, variously naked or in simple clothing, modeling scenes of semi-static interaction, or tableaux vivants, on stage together, punctuated by rhythmic, stylized movements and generally accompanied by a blackout of the lights between each scene. The performers would interact with one another as well as furniture installations by Burton. Audiences for these performances were generally set far away from the stage, with Burton sometimes requiring them to sit behind a venue's regular seating. Art historian David J. Getsy has argued that these performances, exploring nonverbal communication, interpersonal power dynamics, and body language, were informed in large part by Burton's study of behavioral psychology as well as his participation in the culture of nonverbal signaling involved in cruising for sex. Burton himself told an interviewer from the gay magazine The Advocate in 1980 that in his performances, "I try to get the poses that I see in the bars, in baths and on the street corners that I frequent. I mean, my own personal experience has to come [into it.]"

Burton staged another series of performances in March 1971 at Finch College, a women's college in Manhattan, which he titled Eighteen Pieces. He used several pieces of found furniture as stage props for eighteen separate series of tableaux, several of which addressed feminist themes and were performed by students. Several works in the performance consisted of furniture sitting on stage without performers, arranged in different variations to suggest human figures interacting.

Having continued to integrate furniture into his performances, Burton began modifying and making his own furniture objects and sculptures in 1972, though he did not show them publicly for several years. His first work of sculpture was a Queen Anne style wooden chair that he found upon moving into his new apartment in 1969, which he covered in bronze-colored paint in 1972 after using it in several performances. In April 1972, Burton staged the first performance of his work Group Behavior Tableaux at New York's Whitney Museum. The piece included several performers acting out around 80 different scenes on a stage with several pieces of furniture, while the audience watched from at least 40 feet away. Burton staged the performance again in October at the American Theatre Lab. Also in 1972, the managing editor of ARTnews, Elizabeth C. Baker, promoted Burton to assistant editor.

In 1973, Burton gave a presentation at Oberlin College about his career in the form of a performance, Lecture on Self, critiquing the cultural lionization of artists as individuals solely responsible for their creative ideas and success. Wearing a suit, he showed several slides giving an overview of his life and work, all in third person without revealing the subject's name until the end. He then briefly turned off the lights before returning for the second half of the lecture taking audience questions while wearing overalls and a black strap-on dildo. Burton expanded the second portion of the performance, a mocking parody of the minimalist artist Carl Andre based on Andre's outfits and past statements about penis size envy, into the character Modern American Artist, adding tall platform heel boots to the costume. He presented an updated version of the character in 1974 at the nonprofit gallery Artists Space, performing as a living statue on a plinth in the gallery, having also added white face paint to the character. Following the publication in Artforum that year of separate photographs by artists Lynda Benglis and Robert Morris that explored imagery of gender presentation and sexuality, including Benglis's nude self-portrait with a double-sided dildo and Morris's shirtless self-portrait in a helmet and chains, Burton again redeveloped the character in response, adding a large mustache and curly wig and creating several photographic self-portraits in character, primarily satirizing Morris's use of imagery associated with Burton's own gay leather and BDSM communities. He later exhibited a work titled Dream Sex, featuring photographs of both the Carl Andre parody version of the character and the Benglis/Morris version, surrounding a text by Burton claiming to recount a sexual dream about Benglis and Morris after seeing an exhibition of Polaroids featuring the two. Although he was primarily focusing on his sculpture and performance practice at the time, Burton was also hired by Baker in 1974 as a senior editor at Art in America magazine, where Baker had recently become editor-in-chief.

Invitation postcard for Burton's solo exhibition at Artists Space in 1975, on view concurrently with a show by Pamela Jenrette

In early 1975, Burton exhibited his furniture sculpture for the first time at the Whitney Biennial in New York, showing two small wooden table pieces. In March, he staged another performance work, Five Themes of Solitary Behavior, this time at the experimental arts space Idea Warehouse, enlisting his friend, artist and curator Elke Solomon, as the sole performer. The piece involved Solomon walking between, interacting with, and posing near a bed Burton built, a Mission style chair, and a small stool while wearing a pink nightgown, and it primarily focused on internal dynamics as opposed to interpersonal relationships. He mounted his first solo art exhibition in December 1975 at Artists Space, after being selected for an exhibition by artist Claes Oldenburg. Burton used a grant to fund the creation of a cast-bronze replica of the Queen Anne chair he had painted several years earlier, which he titled Bronze Chair and installed on the street outside of the gallery. In addition, he showed the installation work Pastoral Chair Tableau, comprising five found chairs placed on fake grass against a sky–blue curtain, arranged in groupings so two pairs of chairs appeared to be in conversation while one chair was left alone.

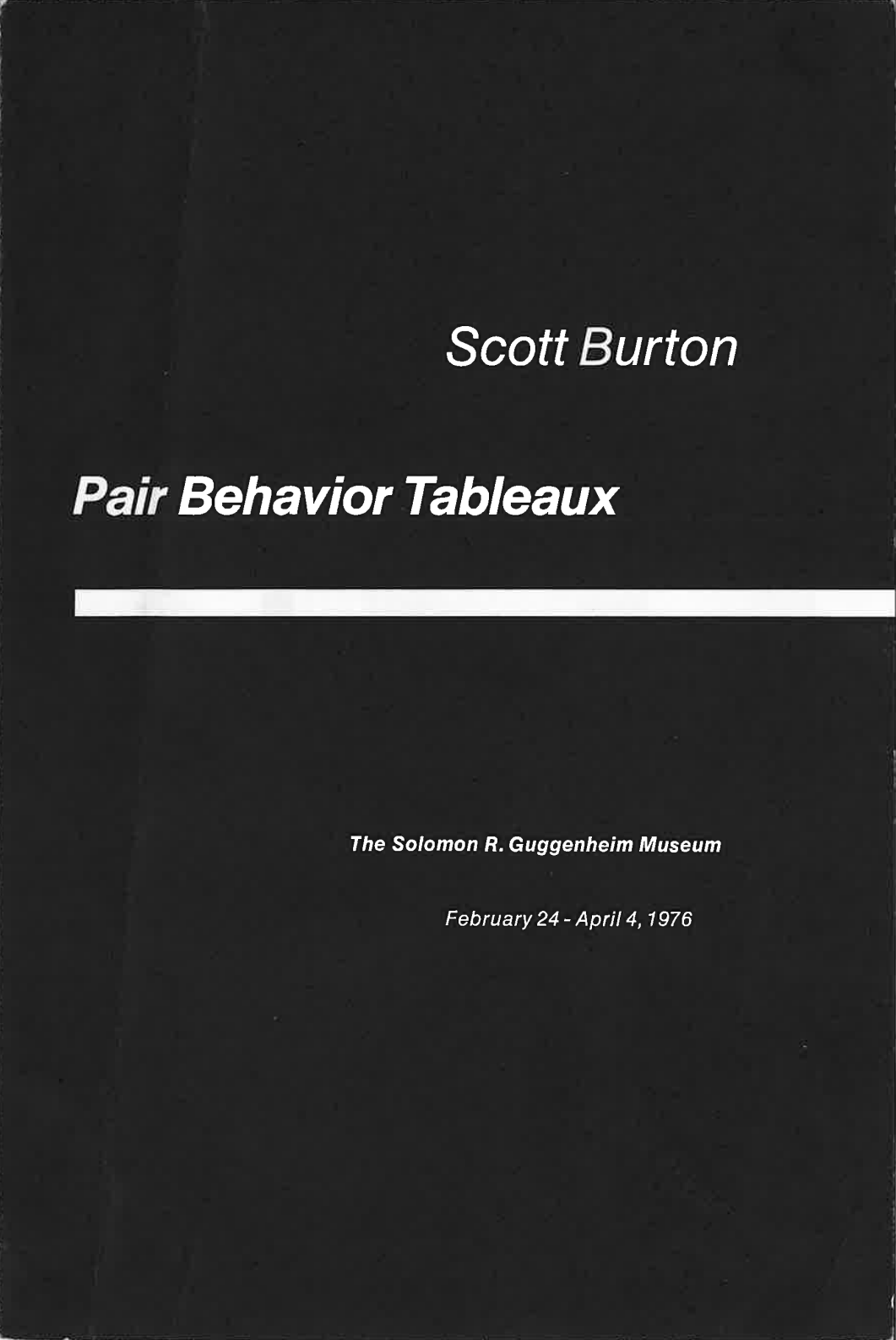
Front cover of the exhibition pamphlet for Burton's Pair Behavior Tableaux at the Solomon R. Guggenheim Museum in 1976

The Solomon R. Guggenheim Museum in New York commissioned a new Tableaux performance by Burton in 1976, a two-person work he titled Pair Behavior Tableaux. The performance ran five times a week for six weeks, the longest an American museum had ever spent presenting performance art at the time. Writing about the piece for Newsday, critic Amei Wallach contrasted Burton's precise, preplanned work with the earlier, more chaotic performance art and happenings of the 1960s, saying Burton's piece was "Apollonian, not Dionysian." Also in 1976, Burton was part of the inaugural group exhibition Rooms at the P.S. 1 Contemporary Art Center in New York. He showed Closet Installation, a work featuring a dildo in the shape of a fist penetrating an aluminum replica of the male gender symbol in a closet, with printed text spiked to the wall reading "Fist–Right of Freedom". Burton dedicated the installation in the exhibition catalogue to "homosexual liberation", marking an example of his works from the decade that were explicit in their references and commitments to gay culture and politics. Critic Robert Pincus-Witten, a friend and colleague of Burton's, published one of the first in-depth articles about his art and career in 1976, primarily focusing on his performance pieces. Burton also left his position at Art in America the same year. Although he had written extensive criticism over the previous decade, he later said that "I was a reviewer. But I never developed at all into a mature critic."

Burton submitted his first proposal for a public design commission in 1976, vying to design a new park in Smithtown, New York, on Long Island, though his proposal lost the competition voted on by the town's residents. He envisioned a park featuring several bronze sculptures of replica Victorian- and Chippendale-style furniture pieces, scattered across a grassy lawn with trees planted in visual conversation with the furniture.

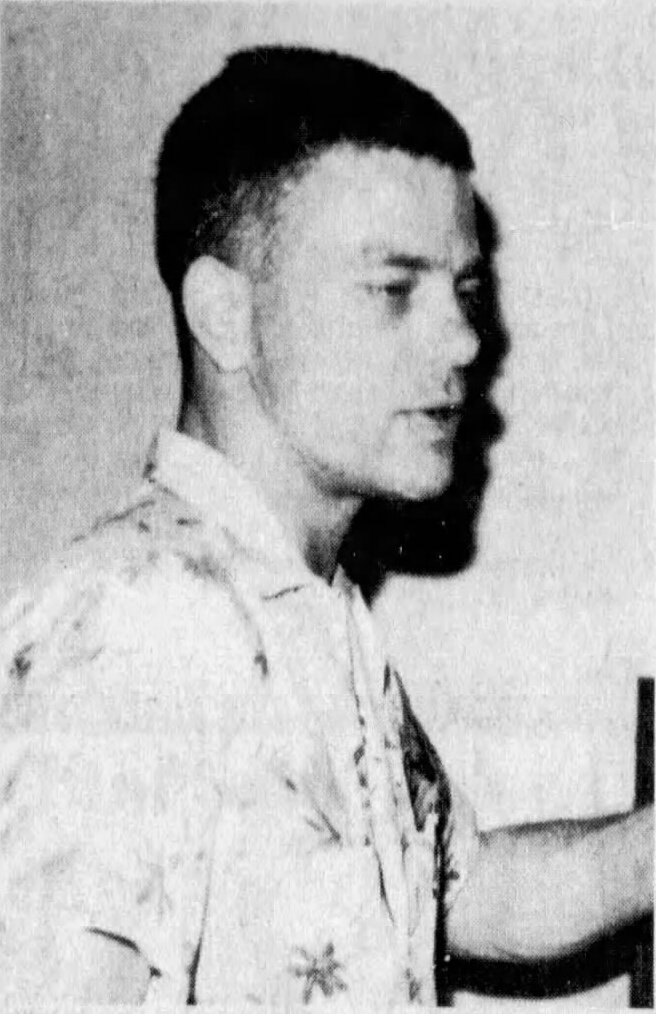
Burton in 1977, photographed while lecturing at the University of North Carolina at Greensboro

In 1977, Burton presented a single-person performance work whose participant performed nude, first at the Museum of Contemporary Art Chicago under the title Solitary Behavior Tableaux. The work evolved over the year and he presented it again in 1977 at the art festival Documenta in Germany and the Philadelphia College of Art under slightly different titles. Burton also worked as a guest lecturer at the University of North Carolina at Greensboro in spring 1977, presenting to students about his performance art and sculptures. While in North Carolina, he completed a version of a wooden Adirondack chair made of pine with elongated back legs, a single horizontal front leg, and rounded edges at the top of the chair's back, similar to the outline of a head and shoulders. He later completed versions of the design in lacquered maple as well as versions coated in yellow formica.

Burton completed another bronze furniture work similar to Bronze Chair in 1978, Rustic Table, cast from a small wooden stick table he found while traveling, whose design he described as unencumbered by standards of the fine art world. He staged another solo exhibition of sculptures at Droll/Kolbert Gallery in New York in 1978, showing several furniture works including a shiny black lacquered table and an oblong table splattered in multicolored paints, as well as a pair of his Adirondack chairs. Burton began working at the leather bar and gay sex club Mineshaft around 1978 as a bartender, and he eventually formed a weekly meetup at the bar for other men who were, like him, shorter than 5 feet 6 inches, which he called the "Short Ass Club". He participated extensively in New York's gay BDSM culture in the 1970s and continued to integrate related imagery and themes into his work throughout the decade.

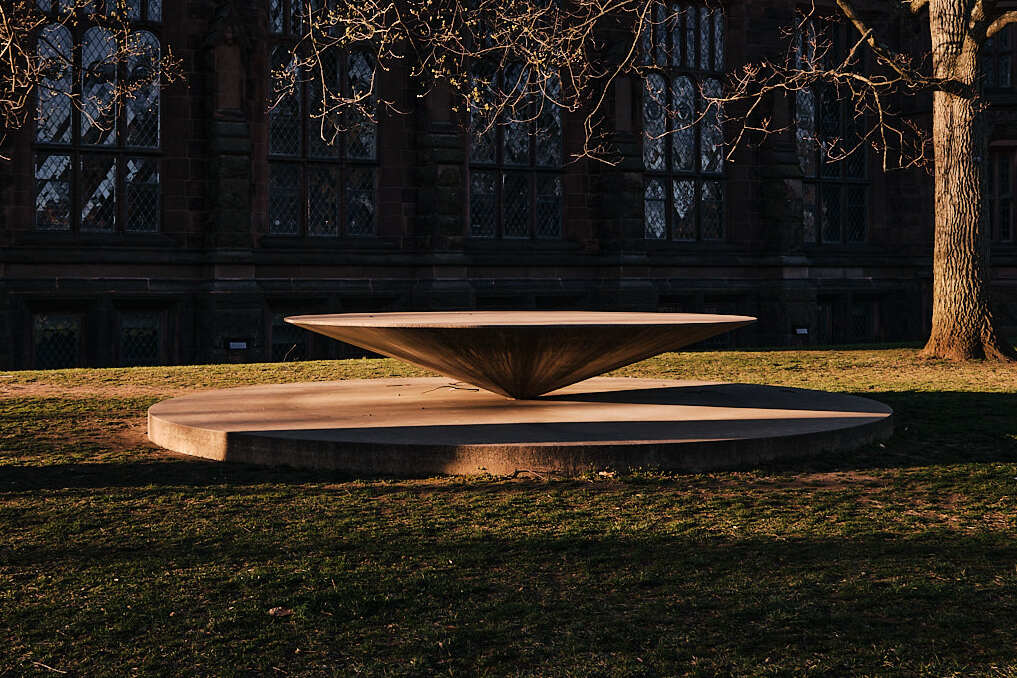
The finalized concrete version of Burton's Public Table, installed at Princeton University

Burton was increasingly attracted to making functional sculptures designed for the public in the late 1970s, writing in a letter to Costa in 1979 that "I am seeing some great possibilities for furniture works (future) [...] Not only the 'useful' artwork, also the 'beneficial.'" That year, he was included in the exhibition 10 Artists/Artists Space at the Neuberger Museum of Art in Purchase, New York, a group show of artists whose solo gallery debuts had all taken place at Artists Space. Seeing the show as an opportunity to make work designed as public, interactive sculpture, Burton presented Public Table, a massive table made of a simple upside down cylindrical cone on a circular base; he exhibited a painted wood version at the museum, later making a finished version in concrete. He also presented the first iteration of his Serpentine Double Banquette, a double-sided bench that he would iterate on in future public works.

=== 1980–1989: Public art and furniture, health decline and death ===
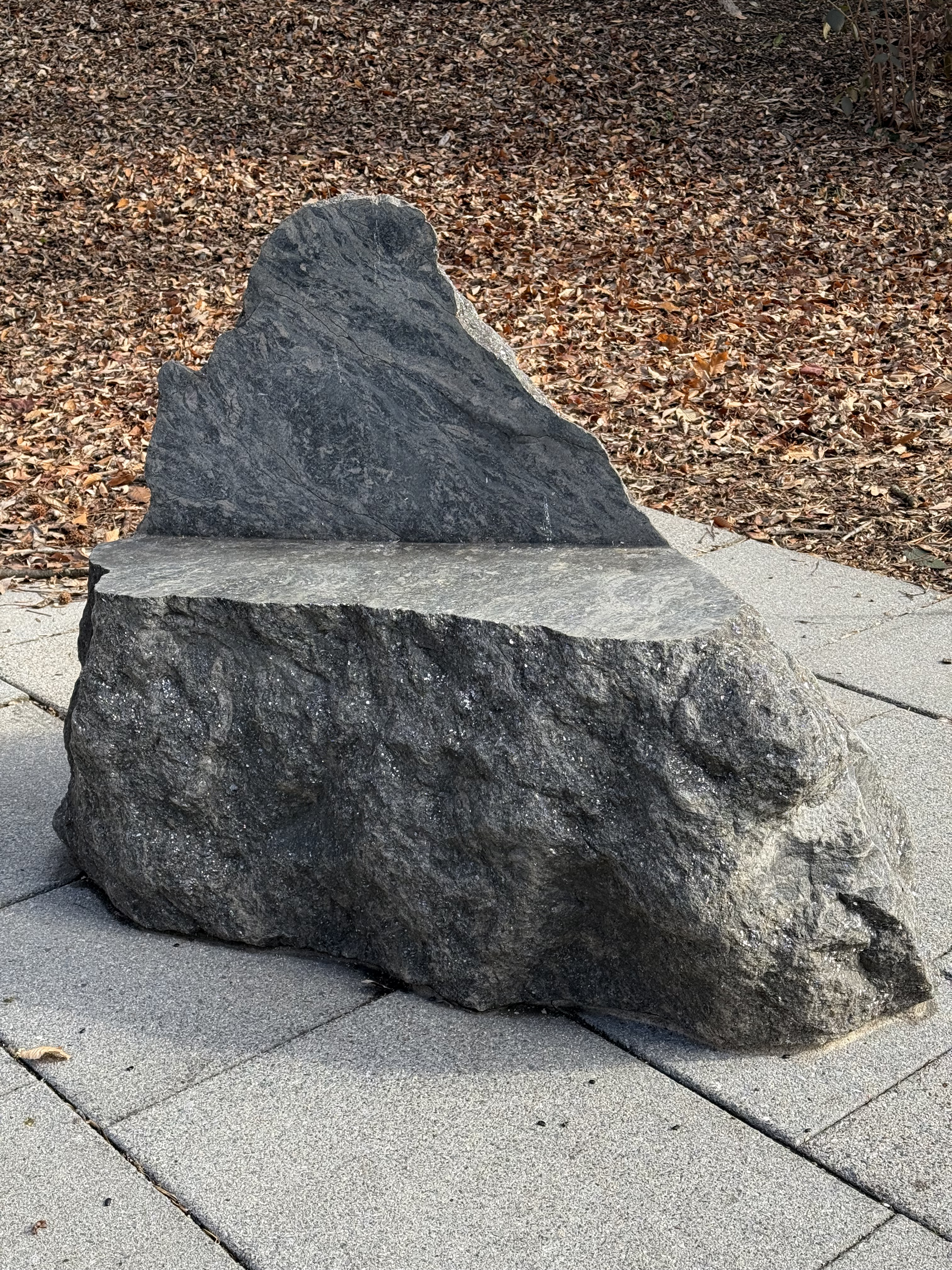
One of Burton's chairs made from boulders and rock slabs, at the Baltimore Museum of Art

In 1980, Burton staged the final version of his single-performer Tableaux performance as a commission for the Berkeley Art Museum in California, under the title Individual Behavior Tableaux. He modified the performance to be more explicit in its visual references to the power dynamics of sexual identity or relationship archetypes like top and bottom or butch and femme, adding several new poses he recreated from his own sexual experiences. Burton also first received commissions to create public art in 1980, his first public commission being the design for a courtyard in a synagogue in Cincinnati. He created cast concrete benches and a concrete podium in the courtyard of the Rockdale Temple, designed to match the cornices of the building structures visible from the outdoor space. That year, speaking about the evolution of his work, he said that "A new kind of relationship (between audience and artwork) seems to be beginning to evolve [...] It will place itself not in front of but around, behind, underneath (literally) the audience". Believing that he would be unable to receive commissions for the kinds of public works he wanted to create if he continued to highlight the gay influences and themes like cruising in his art, Burton stopped pursuing his performance work after 1980. In the early 1980s he also began making large chairs from massive natural boulders he found in rivers and on mountains. He produced each work by mapping out three cuts to the rock to create a flat base, seat, and seat back.

Burton was included in the 1981 Whitney Biennial, exhibiting several large stone chairs and a lighted table made from onyx. The same year, Burton participated in the group show Tableaux at Wave Hill in New York, creating an installation titled Three Trees, a Road and a Fence. The work comprised three small trees arranged next to a short fence with two benches to view them, similar to a stage or a set. Also in 1981, Burton exhibited several works in the group show Developments in Recent Sculpture at the Whitney Museum, including a number of his sharp-edged granite chairs and groups of tables and chairs. Negatively reviewing Burton's work in the show for The New York Times, conservative critic Hilton Kramer said of his sculptures: "What they amount to, I think, is a variety of 'camp' attempting to go straight, and having a difficult time of it." Getsy argued that Kramer's use of the term camp was an attempt to reduce Burton's work to stereotypes about gay people.

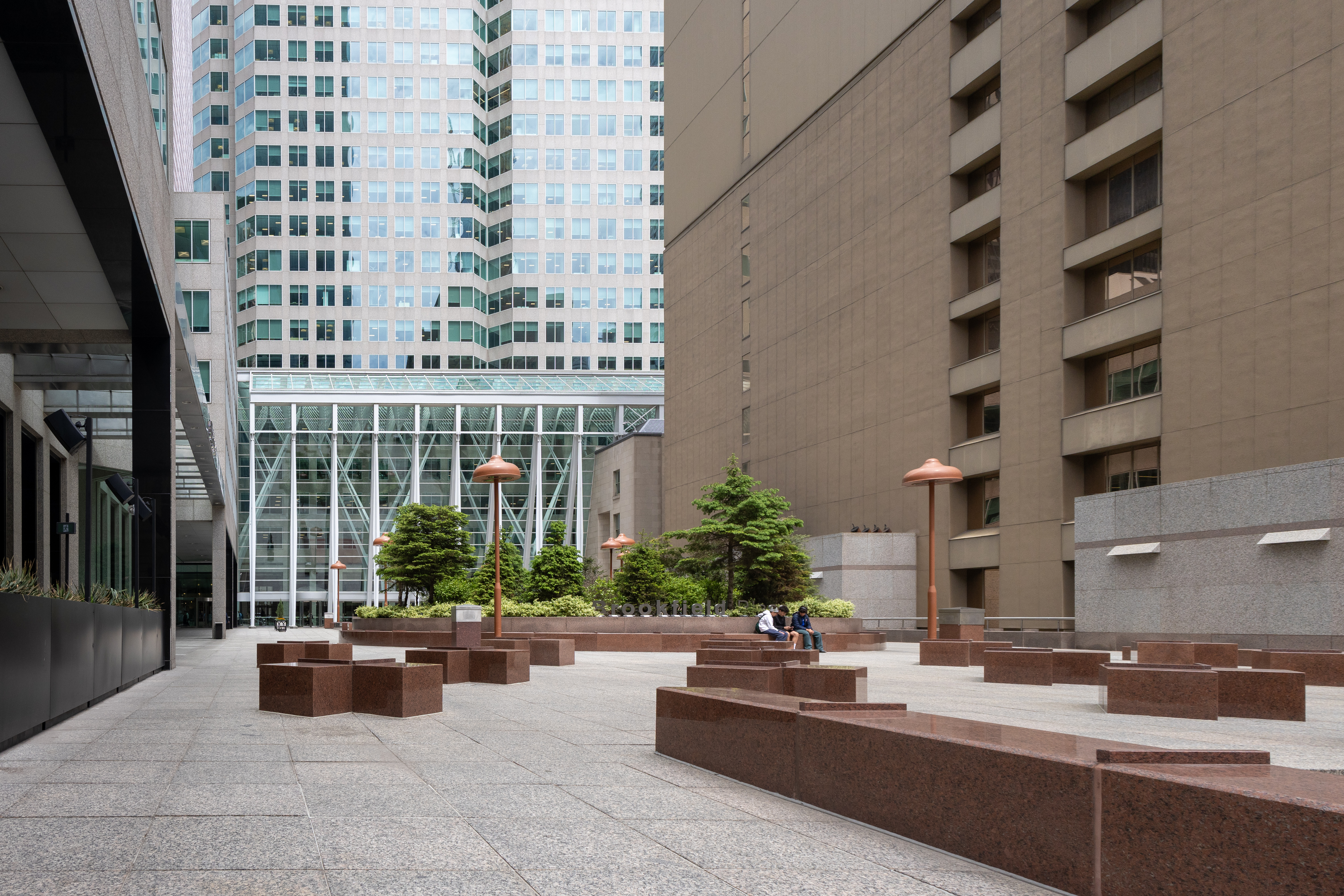
The Burton-designed public plaza at Brookfield Place in Toronto, completed posthumously

Max Protetch Gallery in New York hosted a solo exhibition of table and chair sculptures by Burton in 1982, including a plastic chair and a chair made from a 1400-lb piece of granite, displayed alongside vintage chairs made by modernist designers Marcel Breuer, Ludwig Mies van der Rohe and Mart Stam. He had another solo show with Protetch the next year, exhibiting a table and chair set made from bronze and leather, a set of pedestal-style tables, and a number of storage cube sculptures. Burton was invited to submit a design in 1983 for a public plaza in Toronto at the Canada Trust Tower. Though the plaza was not completed in his lifetime, he later said that the work was important as "the first plaza I've designed entirely by myself." His planned design, Garden Court, involved a large circular planter in terracotta-colored granite with built-in seating surrounding a small pond with boulders, as well as a series of V-shaped granite seats arranged in a geometric pattern. He also designed a series of eight lampposts made from metal painted a similar color to the seating.

Burton learned he had developed AIDS around 1983, possibly from an infection related to the illness as he did not have access to testing. He completed two public commissions in 1983, including for a NOAA regional facility near Seattle, where he created a garden terrace with a view of a nearby lake, featuring a large combination planter–settee and several rock chairs. His other commission that year, for Artpark State Park in Niagara County, New York, consisted of a large upside down concrete pyramid embedded in the ground to form a table, surrounded by four smaller upside down pyramids serving as chairs. The Contemporary Arts Center in Cincinnati opened the first solo museum exhibition of Burton's sculptures in 1983, focusing primarily on his chair pieces. The exhibition traveled later that year to the Modern Art Museum of Fort Worth, before traveling again to the Contemporary Arts Museum Houston. Burton returned to Houston in 1984 for a solo exhibition with the McIntosh/Drysdale Gallery, presenting several of his large geometric granite and marble chairs.

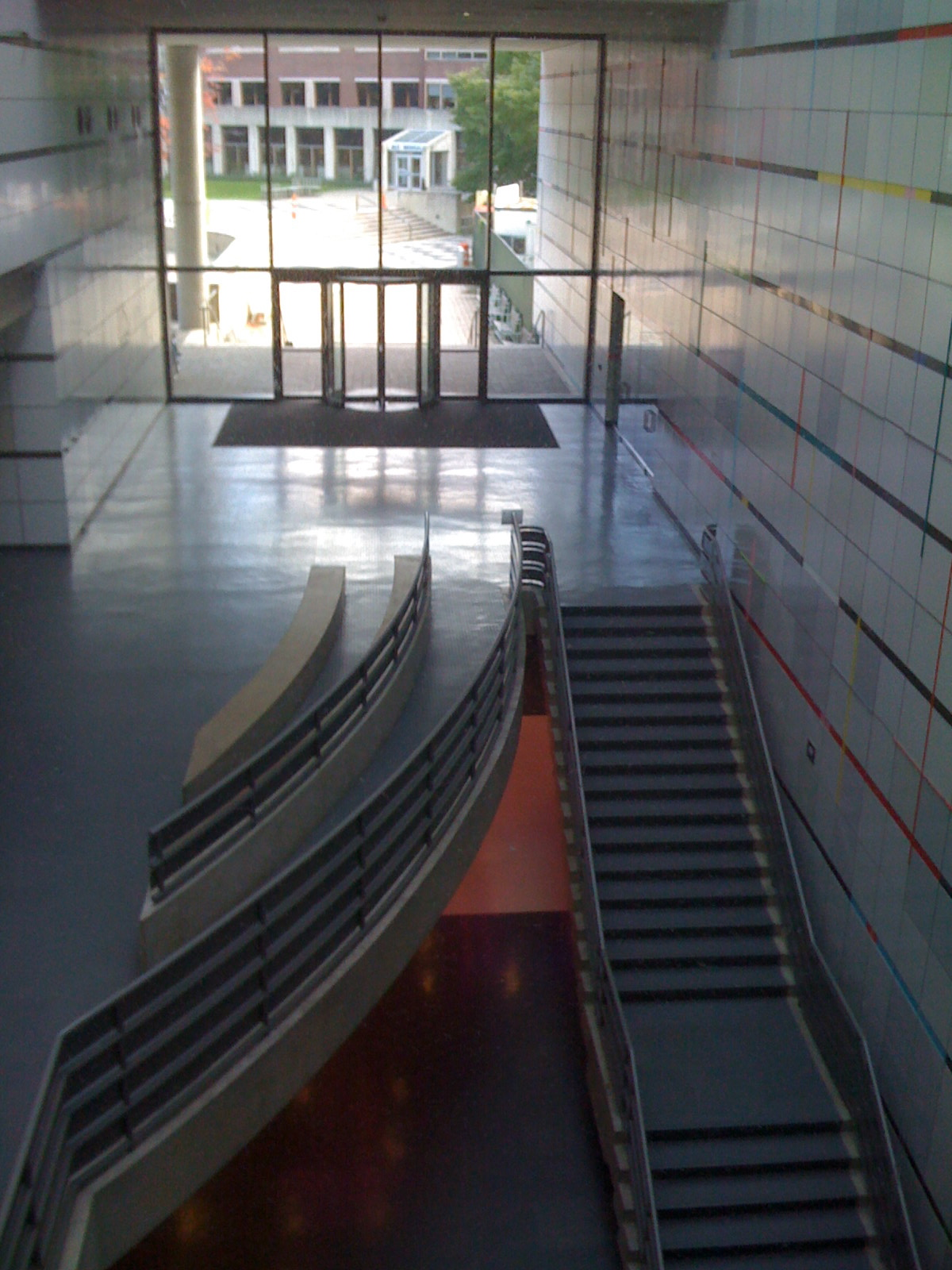
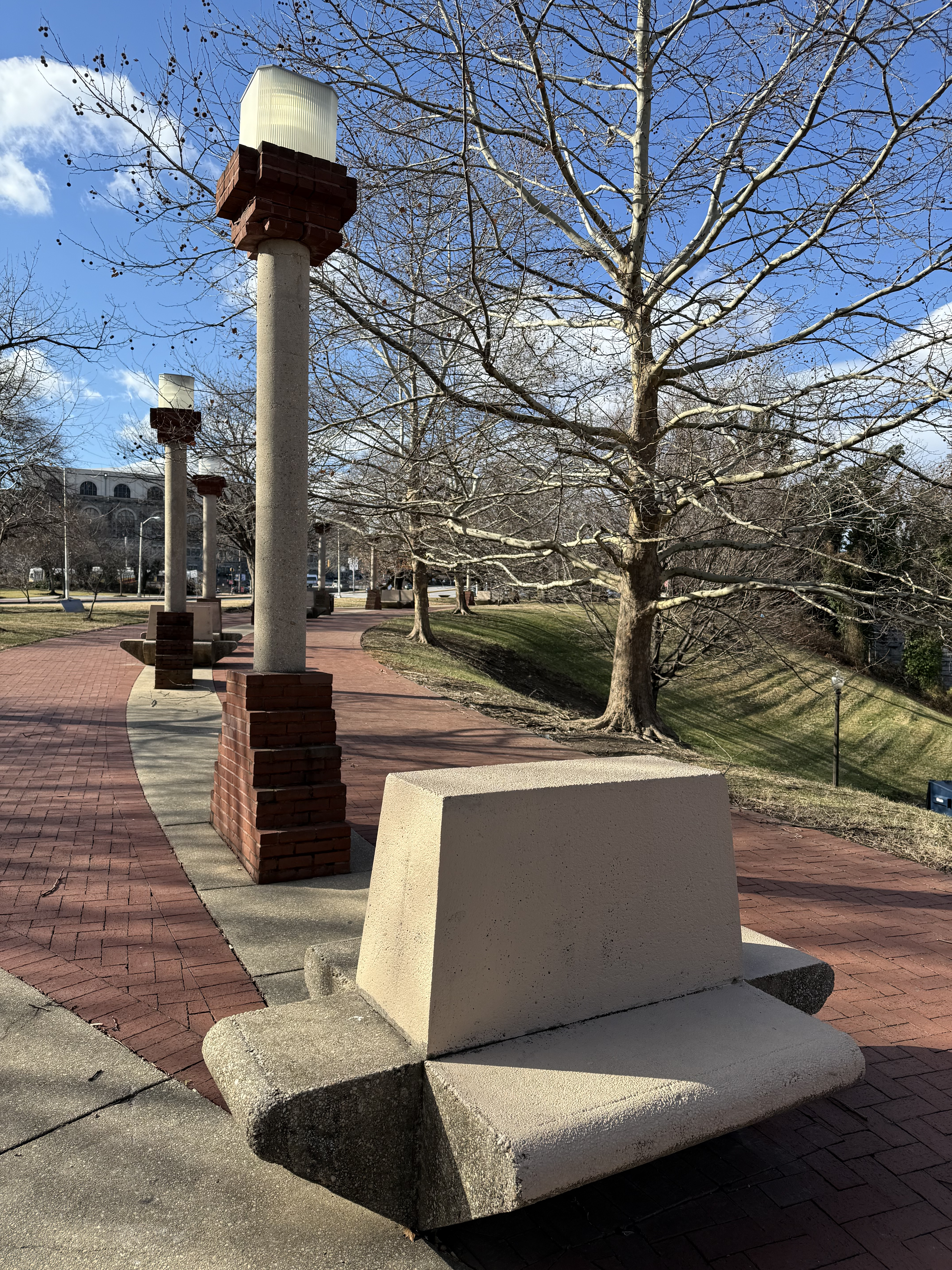
At left, Burton's bench design for the atrium of the Wiesner Building at the Massachusetts Institute of Technology; and at right, a bench and lamppost in the Burton-designed Pearlstone Park in Baltimore; both completed in 1985

In 1985, the Massachusetts Institute of Technology opened the Wiesner Building, designed by architect I. M. Pei with the collaboration of Burton, Kenneth Noland, and Richard Fleischner on public art inside and around the building. Burton designed several seating elements for the building, including a chair made from volcanic rock and long curved benches in the atrium mirroring the shape of the atrium's railings. Although several curved balconies were added to the atrium by other designers, which the artist said "de-Burtonized" the space, he told The New York Times that he welcomed the required compromises and constraints in collaborative public design as a useful creative force. Burton was also commissioned in 1985 to create work for the Allen/Medical Campus station in Buffalo, New York. He designed two long bronze benches for the metro station referencing the furniture style of the Arts and Crafts movement, which had extensive historical participation in Buffalo. In September 1985, he exhibited new chair sculptures in a solo show at the Tate Gallery in London, including several made from blocks of pink marble.

Also in 1985, Burton staged another solo exhibition at Max Protetch Gallery, where he showed a number of stone chairs, couches, and settees, several of which were made with interlocking pieces of granite that combined to form the furniture objects. The same year, he completed a commission to redesign Pearlstone Park in Baltimore, where he spent significant time watching pedestrian walking patterns in the park to guide his design. In addition to streamlining the walking paths, Burton installed a series of 12 concrete bench sculptures and columnar brick lampposts, all laid out in a curved line mirroring the shape of the adjacent Joseph Meyerhoff Symphony Hall.

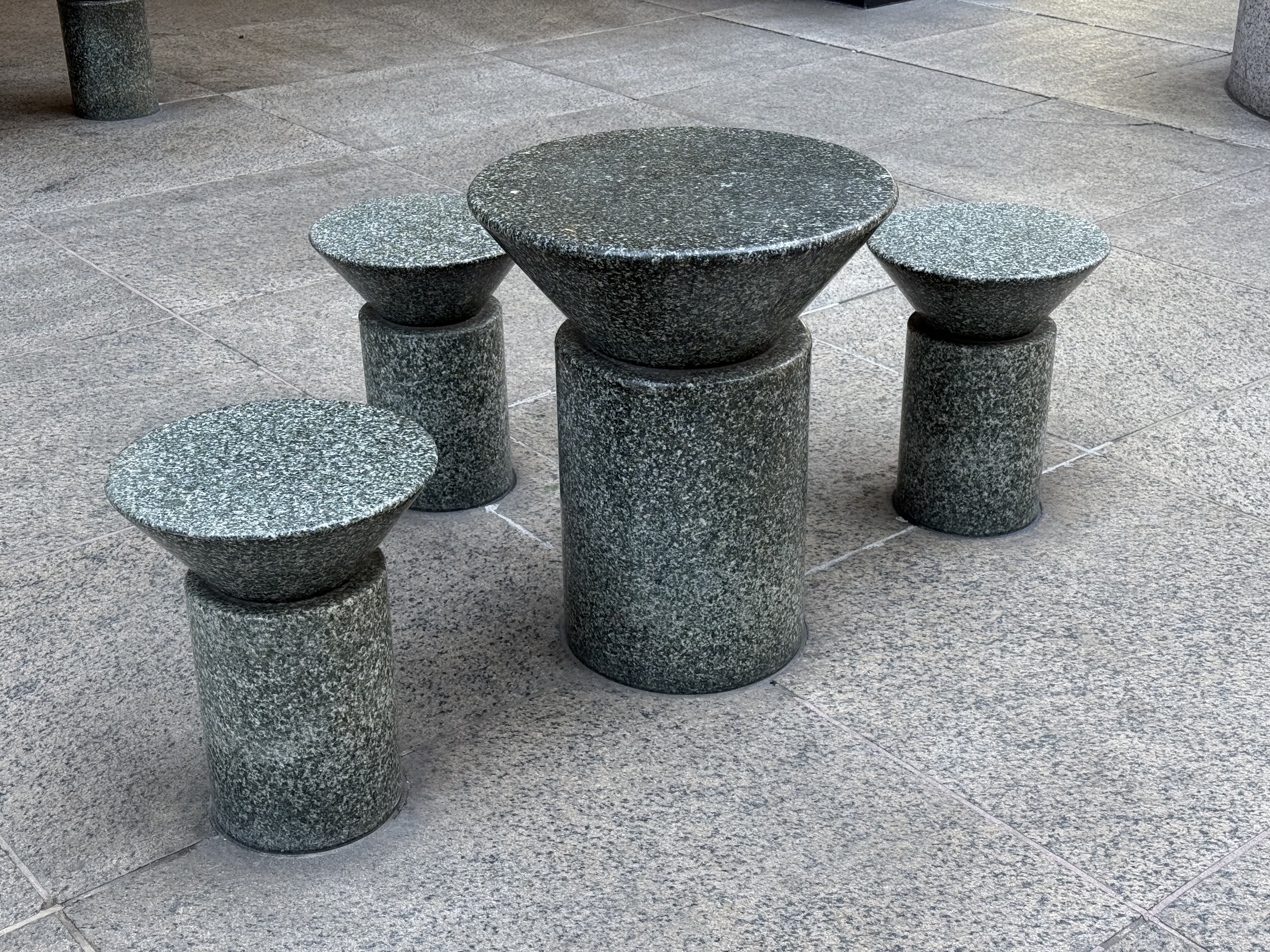
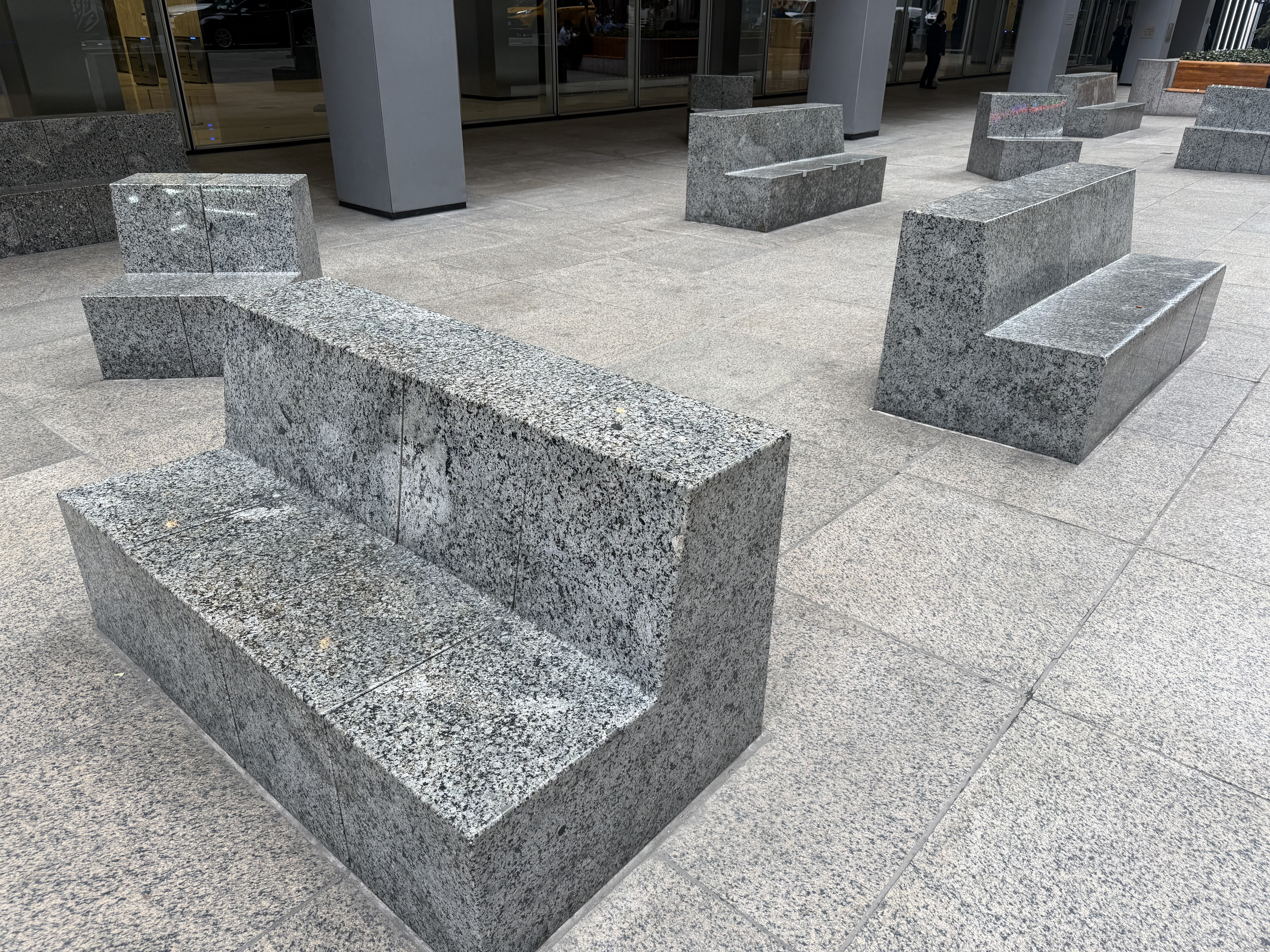
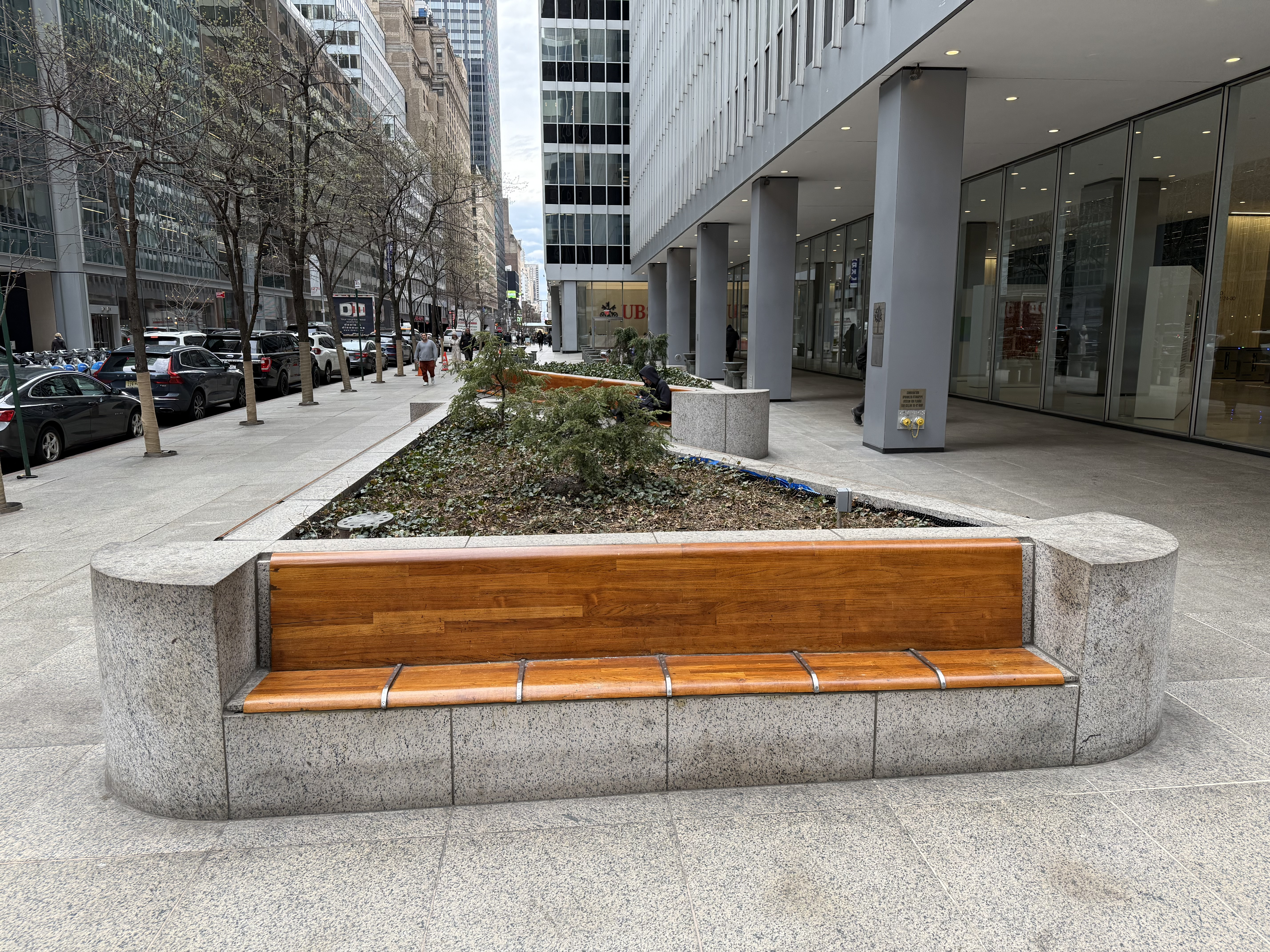
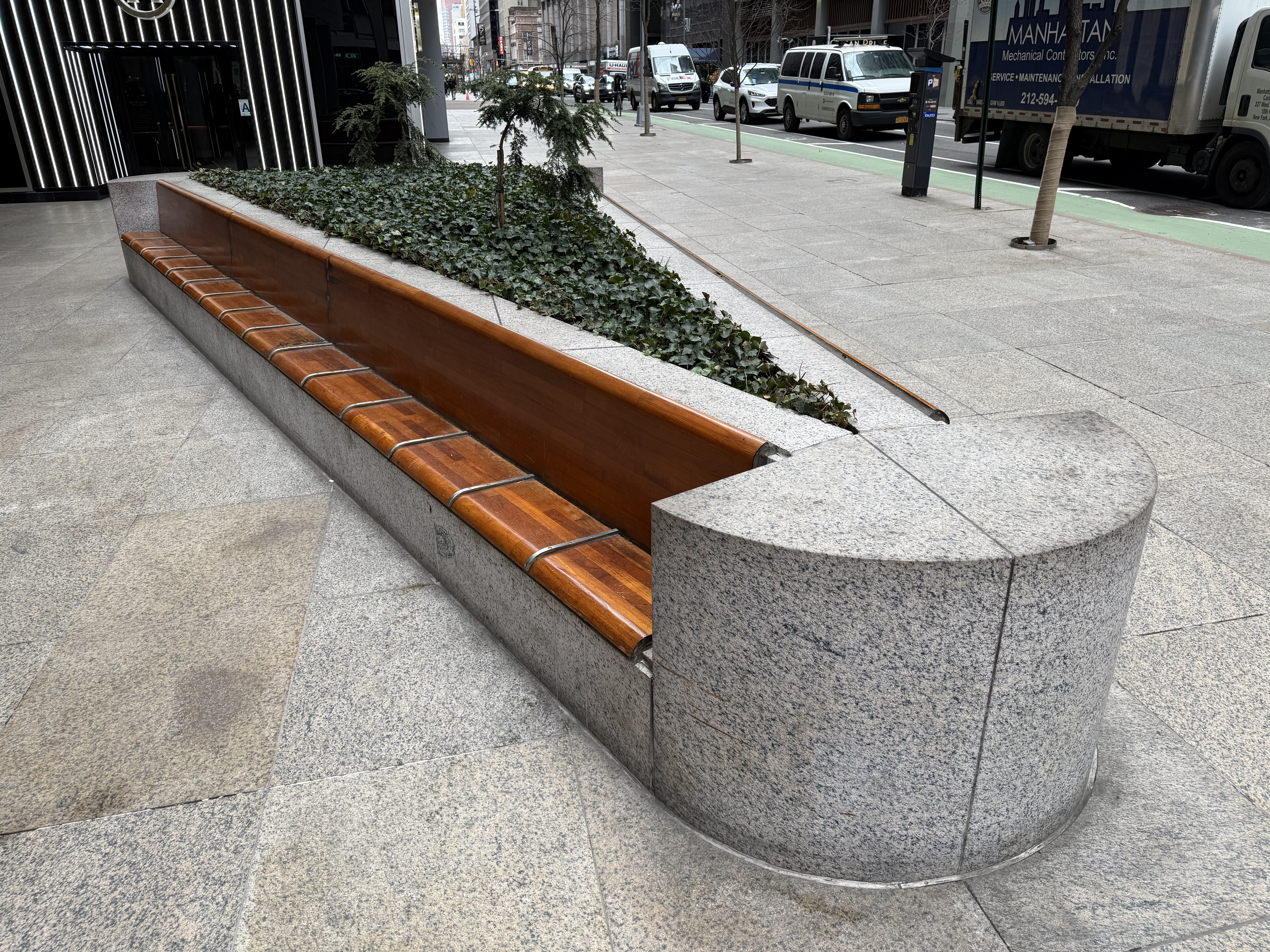
Stools, tables, benches, and planters designed by Burton for the Equitable Center in Manhattan

Burton completed a commission in 1986 for the lobby of the newly built Equitable Center in New York, designing a large circular bench and low table made from green marble, surrounded by evergreens in marble planters and illuminated with onyx light fixtures. First commissioned by the Equitable Life Assurance Society in 1983, Burton's design also included floor patterns made from granite, marble, and bronze. He said that his goal for the installation was to design a space that would serve as a regular meeting point or landmark for the public. Burton was later commissioned to expand his work on the Equitable Center, designing two outdoor plaza seating areas including stools, settees, tables, and planters, mostly made from blue granite. He also completed a commission for the University of Houston in 1986, at the university's Hines College of Architecture. After being recommended for the project by the building's architect Philip Johnson, Burton designed two pink granite benches flanking the school's entrance. The same year, Burton installed a set of six geometric L-shaped granite chairs in a circle in front of the One Mellon Center building in Pittsburgh after they were purchased by the bank.

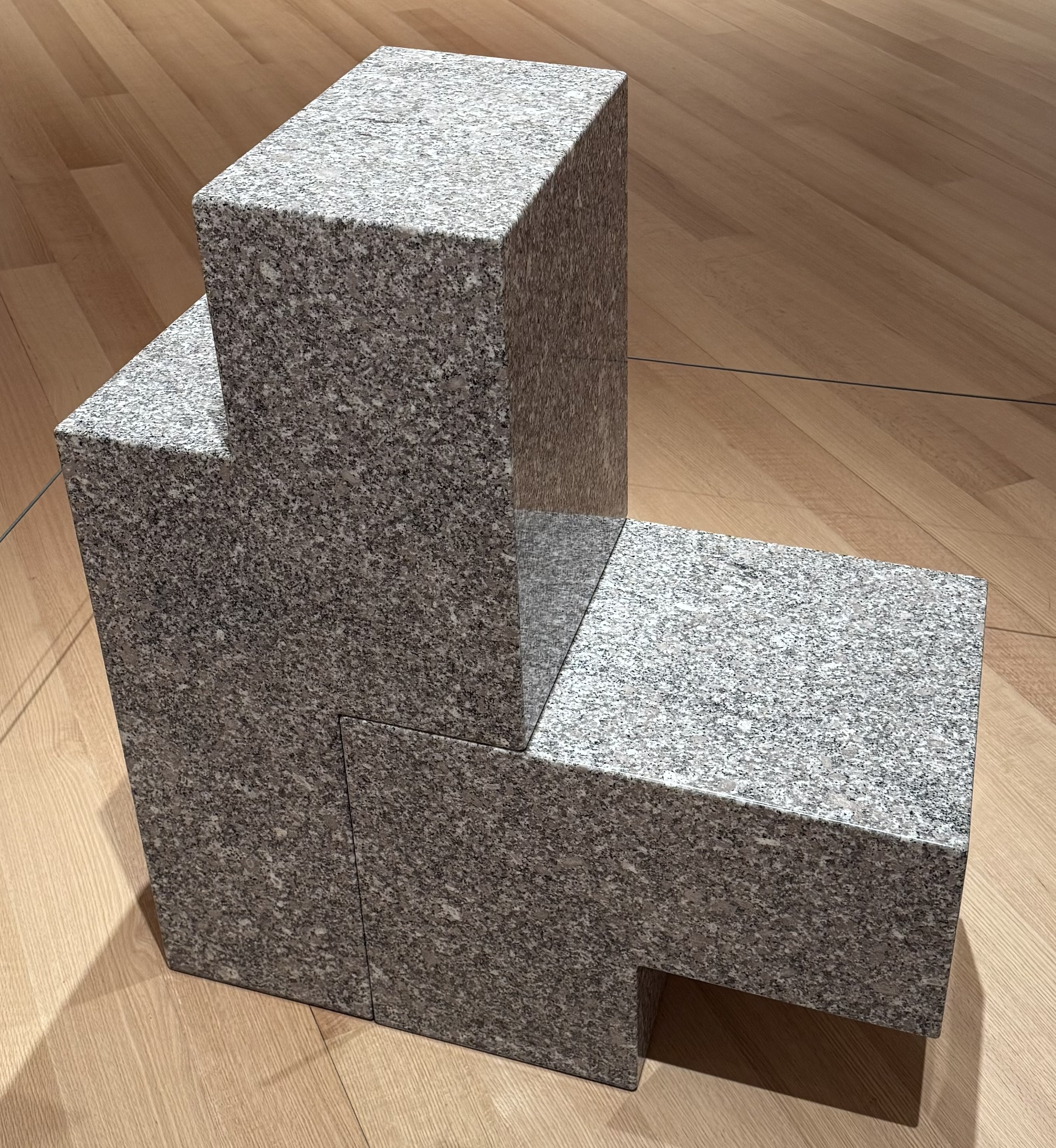
Two-Part Chair on view at the Buffalo AKG Art Museum

The Baltimore Museum of Art organized the first retrospective exhibition of Burton's sculpture in 1986, featuring 35 works from the previous 13 years. Nervous that commissioning institutions or the public would react negatively to the gay themes in his earlier work, Burton asked the curator, Brenda Richardson, to focus the exhibition on his furniture sculptures and public art, avoiding most references in the show or its catalogue to his performance work or conceptual art from the 1960s and 1970s. The survey was well-received by critics, several of whom complimented Burton's ability to distill his ideas into concise forms. (Note: The exhibition was positively reviewed in The Baltimore Sun, The Washington Post, Artforum, and The Philadelphia Inquirer.) One of the newest works in the exhibition was Two-Part Chair, a sculpture made the same year from two interlocking pieces of granite cut into geometric shapes combined to form a minimalist chair which, when viewed in side profile, appeared like an abstracted representation of two figures having anal sex. Getsy has argued that the work was an attempt by Burton to subtly reveal the gay influences in his art to his audience as his health declined from the effects of his HIV diagnosis. Shortly after the opening of the exhibition, Burton underwent a splenectomy to remove his spleen, a procedure that at the time was being tested as a possible treatment for AIDS patients.

Burton participated in the 8th Documenta in Germany in 1987, creating an installation of stone benches in a circle around bamboo plants. As part of a commission for the 1987 Skulptur Projekte Münster, also in Germany, he created a pair of curved wooden benches in a public park in the city. The same year, Burton staged another solo exhibition with Max Protetch in New York, showing a number of his recent geometric chairs, tables, and benches made from pieces of interlocking marble and granite.

In 1988, Burton completed a commission for the Joslyn Art Museum in Omaha, Nebraska, installing a series of granite settees in the museum's sculpture garden. He had previously been selected to make a sculpture for Omaha's Central Park Mall but his work was not used by the city. The same year, he was commissioned by the National Gallery of Art in Washington to create two rock settees for the museum's East Building. Burton worked with the curators to choose specific cuts of rock from a quarry in Minnesota to complement the color of the stone building.

He opened a solo museum retrospective at the Kunsthalle Düsseldorf in Germany in March 1989. In April, Burton was the first participant in the Artist's Choice exhibition series at the Museum of Modern Art, which the museum's curator Kirk Varnedoe created to let artists curate shows from the museum's collection. Burton was given the opportunity to organize a show of sculptures by Constantin Brâncuși, whose work he saw as a significant influence, and he displayed many of the sculptures directly on the floor or exhibited their Brâncuși–designed pedestals as standalone works. The exhibition, Burton on Brancusi, also included several of Burton's own works in the museum's sculpture garden. Burton on Brancusi was fiercely contested by several art critics who saw Burton's treatment of Brâncuși's sculpture as ahistorical or revisionist. Although some critics reacted positively, including Karin Lipson writing for Newsday who called the show "amusingly perverse", Kramer labeled the exhibition "gruesome... esthetic vandalism", and it contributed to skepticism by some critics of Varnedoe's leadership at the museum.

While on a trip to Germany in late summer 1989 to plan for another tour stop of his retrospective exhibition, Burton was hospitalized by the increasing effects of his illness. He flew home to New York only after signing a provisional will.

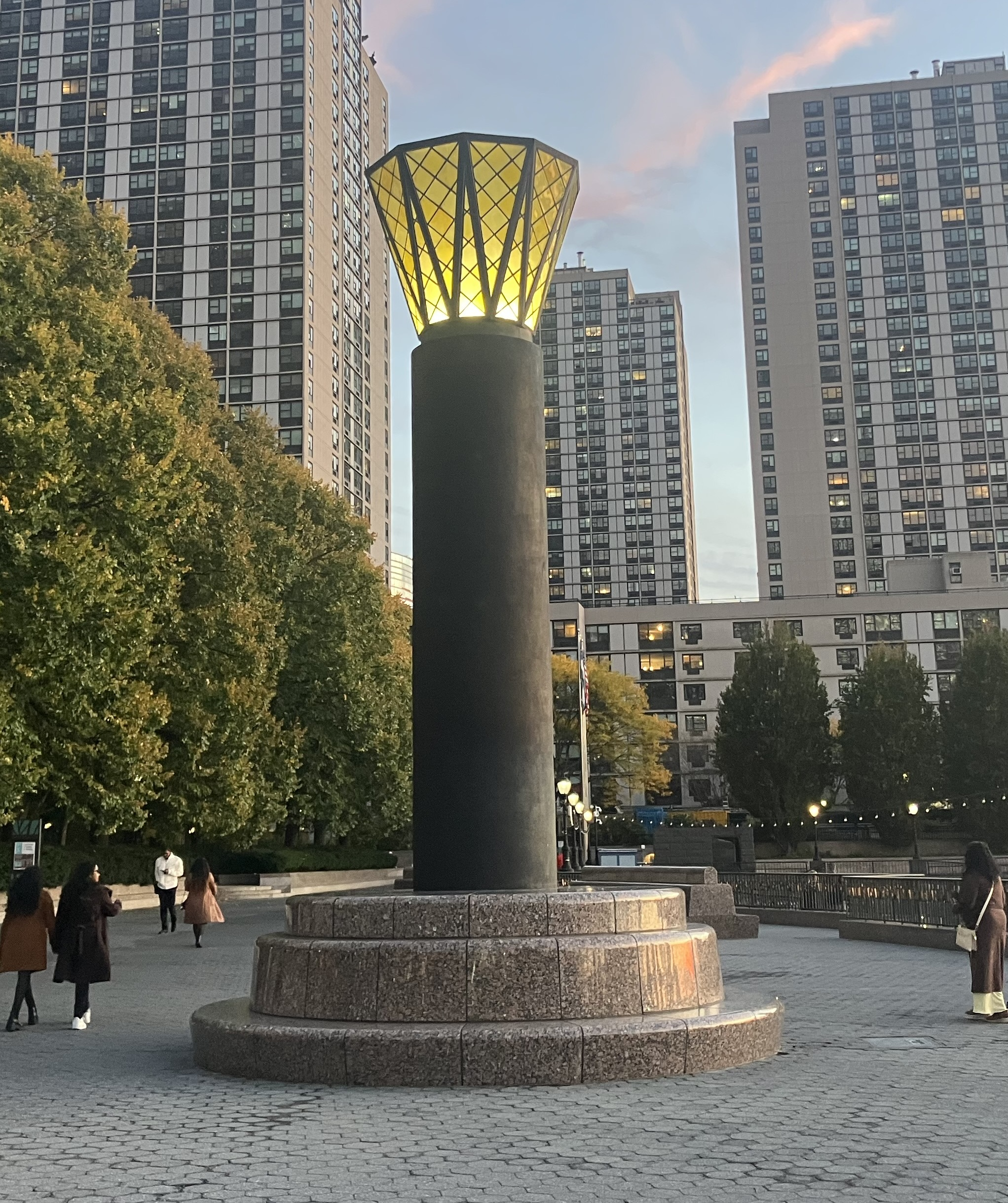

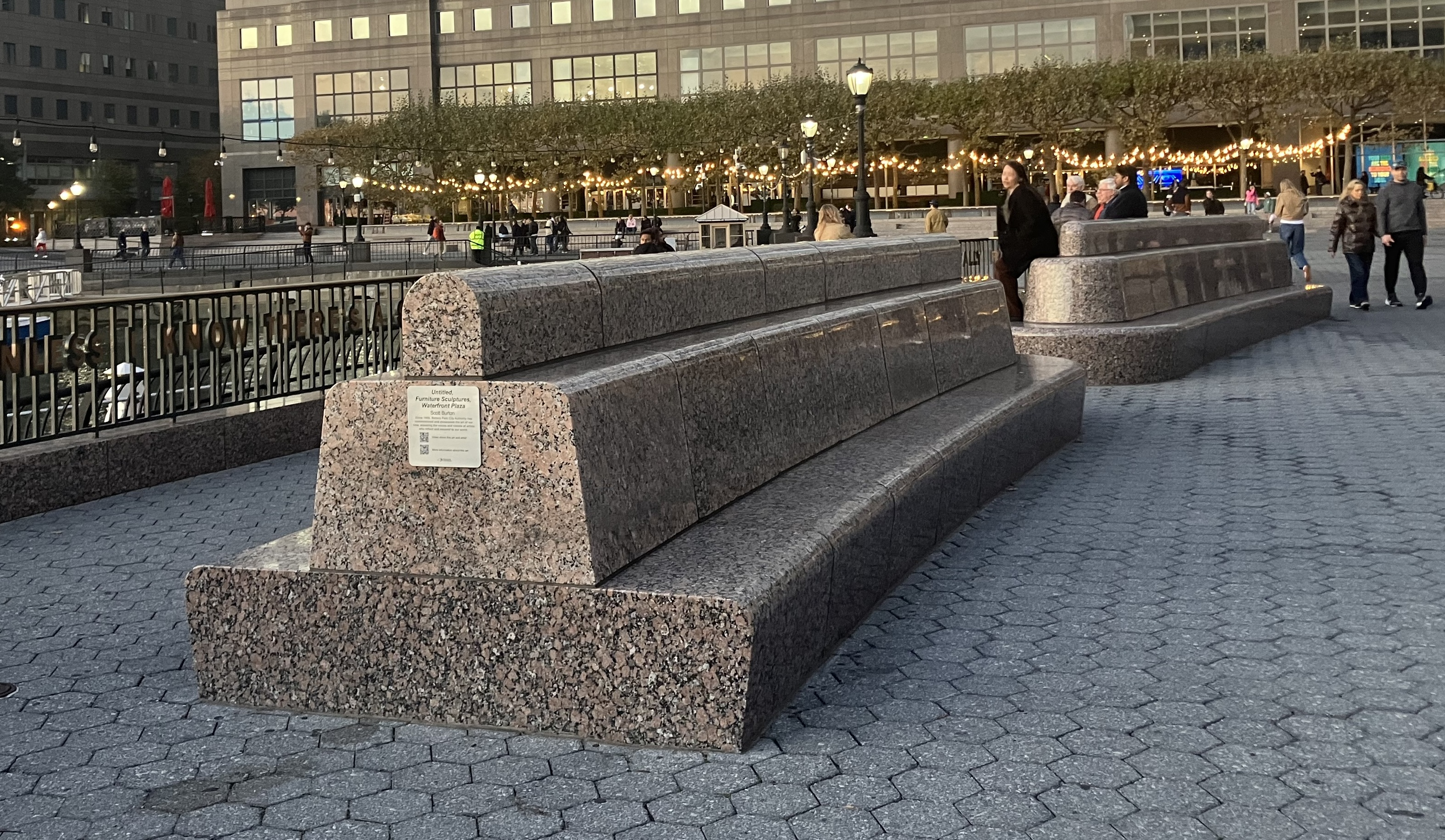
Burton's column and benches in the plaza surrounding the North Cove Marina

Also in 1989, work was completed on Burton's collaborative commission with artist Siah Armajani on the design of the public plaza in the World Financial Center, a new mixed-use development in New York's Battery Park City neighborhood. Burton's work on the plaza, which surrounds the North Cove Marina, included curved benches in red granite, a large column, and a series of stone ottomans and steps that serve as chairs. The artists worked extensively with architect César Pelli to merge their ideas for the plaza.

Among the final works Burton completed in 1989 was a piece that came to be known as The Last Tableau, consisting of two guardian-like wooden armoires with bronze discs on their tops to look like human figures surrounding a pink granite chaise lounge shaped like an abstracted chacmool sculpture, arranged in front of a metal bench that appeared like a person on their hands and knees. The design for the work was finalized but had not been fabricated before Burton's death. Burton died of AIDS-related illness on December 29, 1989, at age 50, at Cabrini Medical Center in New York. Although he was survived by his partner, Jonathan Erlitz, his will referred to Erlitz only as a "friend", and his obituaries in The New York Times and The Washington Post both claimed he left no immediate survivors.

== Legacy and influence ==
=== Museum of Modern Art estate ownership ===
In the weeks before his death in 1989, Burton met with lawyers and friends, including Varnedoe of the Museum of Modern Art, to plan his estate and update his provisional will. Burton altered his will so that, after passing to his partner Erlitz - who died in 1998 - his estate would be owned by the museum, including his possessions, art, and copyright. The museum agreed to the plan, although contemporary representatives of the museum have said they do not know when or how it was formally agreed to.

Journalist Julia Halperin first reported in 2015 for The Art Newspaper that the museum was facing challenges in its role as the owner of Burton's estate, particularly because the scholarly mission of the institution clashed with the traditional goals of an artist's estate, namely growing the artist's posthumous recognition and market through sustained exhibitions and sales. Consequently, prices for Burton's work at auction had fallen significantly and few museums or galleries had staged large solo posthumous exhibitions of his work. Reporting for The New York Times in 2024, Halperin found that the artist's market was still struggling to recover despite increased academic and popular attention brought to Burton's work in the interim.

=== Posthumous exhibitions and installations ===
The Detroit Institute of Arts exhibited four benches by Burton in 1990 to honor him as part of the second annual Day Without Art, a nationwide memorial event for artists and others who died of AIDS-related illnesses. In 1991, two years after Burton's death, the Whitney Museum fabricated and exhibited his multi-sculpture installation The Last Tableau.

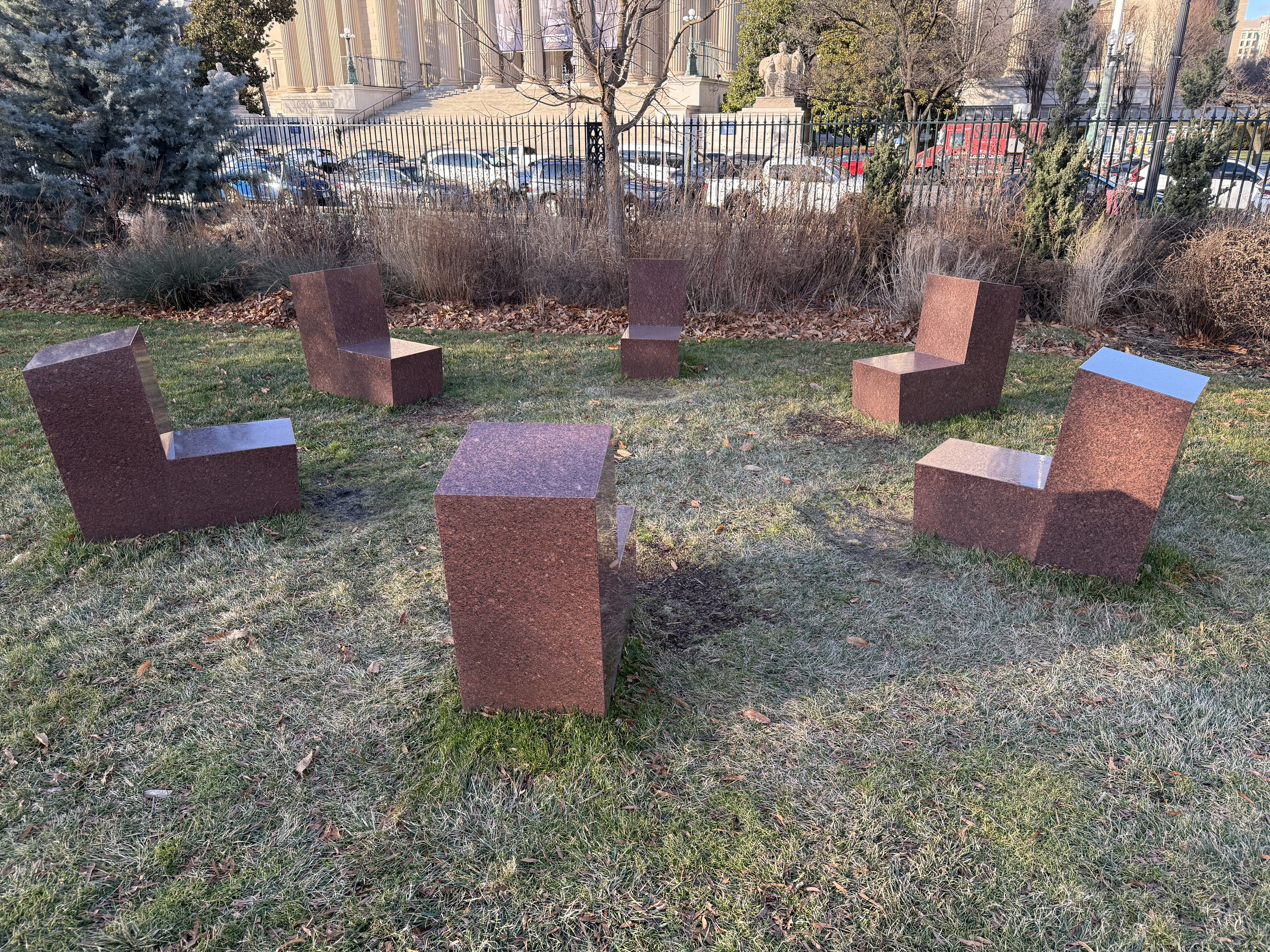
Burton's chair arrangement Six-Part Seating, in the National Gallery of Art Sculpture Garden

Burton's design for a plaza outside a tower in Toronto, Garden Court, was completed posthumously in 1992. His plan for an environmental installation in Sheepshead Bay, Brooklyn, was completed in 1994. The work consisted of a series of weather vanes and flag poles, benches, light poles, and wooden ottomans arranged on the neighborhood's piers. Burton's work Six-Part Seating, a set of L-shaped granite chairs in a circle, was installed in the National Gallery of Art Sculpture Garden in 1999.

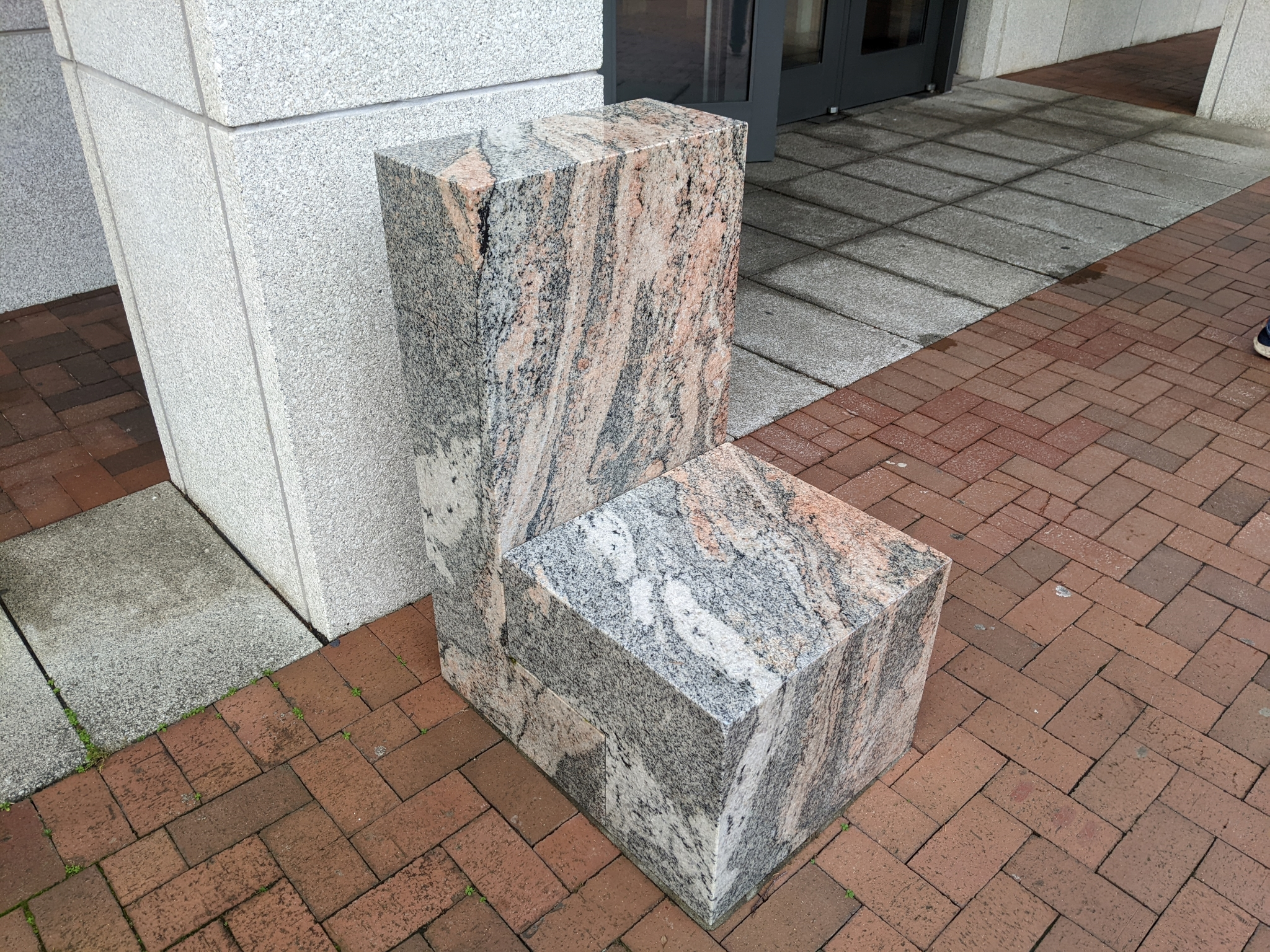
One of Burton's chairs, installed on the Western Washington University campus

In 2001, the Wexner Center for the Arts in Columbus, Ohio, staged a series of overlapping exhibitions focused on design arts, including a retrospective of work by Burton. More than twenty of his pieces served as the central motif throughout all the exhibitions. The Institut Valencià d'Art Modern in Spain opened Burton's first standalone posthumous retrospective exhibition in 2004, featuring nearly 30 pieces and primarily surveying his furniture works. Western Washington University acquired and installed a furniture sculpture work by Burton on the school's campus as part of its permanent public sculpture collection in 2005.

Burton was one of several deceased artists whose work was featured in Greater New York in 2015, MoMA PS1's recurring exhibition of contemporary art from the New York area. The Pulitzer Arts Foundation in St. Louis (Note: The exhibition was co-organized with the nonprofit gallery Wrightwood 659 in Chicago, where it traveled after closing in Missouri.) opened a posthumous retrospective of Burton's work in 2024, the first retrospective since the artist's death to comprehensively cover his career. The exhibition was positively reviewed in a wide range of publications. (Note: The retrospective received positive reviews in Art in America, The Brooklyn Rail, the Chicago Tribune, frieze, The New York Review of Books, The New York Times, the Observer, and The Wall Street Journal.)

=== Dismantling and preservation of public work ===
Many of Burton's site-specific public designs and sculptures have been subject to alteration or relocation, or have been destroyed or damaged purposely or through neglect. By 2026, around half of Burton's public works had been destroyed or significantly altered.

The Burton-designed Pearlstone Park in Baltimore suffered significant damage due to lack of maintenance by the city after it was installed in 1985. The nearby Maryland Institute College of Art funded a clean-up and refurbishment of the site in 2008.

Hurricane Sandy damaged or destroyed several elements of Burton's posthumous installation on the piers in Sheepshead Bay, Brooklyn, in 2012. The city removed the remainder of the work in 2022. Shortly after, the city partnered with Kasmin Gallery to allow American artist Oscar Tuazon to use the remnants of the piece to create an installation titled Eternal Flame For Scott Burton, set to be installed at the New York City AIDS Memorial.

Burton's lobby seating installation for the Equitable Center in New York, Atrium Furnishment, was removed in 2020 when the building was renovated. Equitable's art curator Jeremy Johnston saved the work from being destroyed and found a donor to support the long-term storage of the work. The outdoor seating installations at the building remain in place. In 2023, Johnston and several collaborators organized an exhibition in New York featuring elements of Burton's lobby installation displayed alongside the work of other artists. Spanish artist Álvaro Urbano utilized several components of Burton's piece to create an installation for SculptureCenter in New York in 2025 titled TABLEAUX VIVANT, comprising around half of the seating elements arranged beneath flat panels of LED lights hung from the ceiling, with various small plants and half-eaten apples made from concrete scattered around the scene to recall the setting of The Ramble in Central Park, a noted location for cruising.

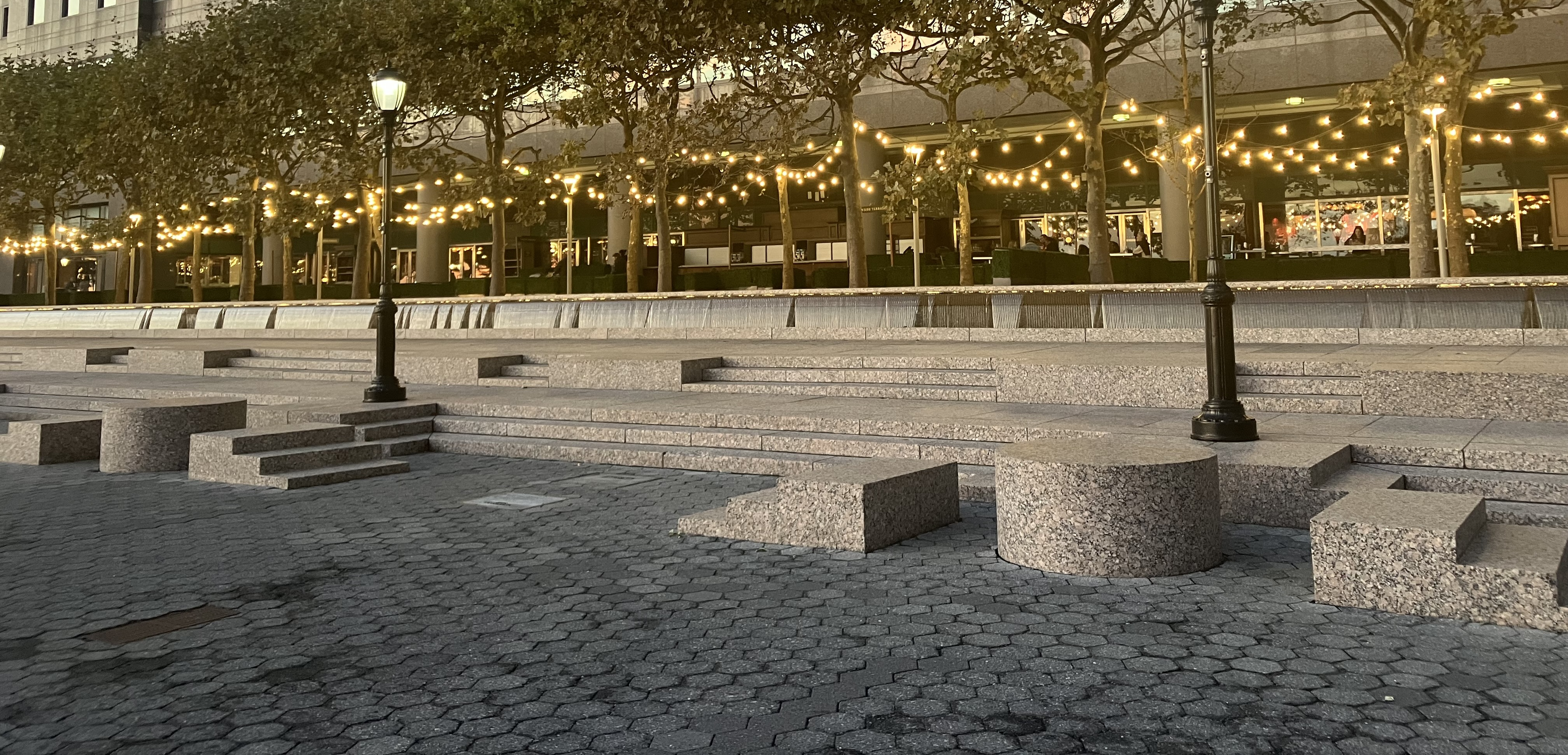
Burton's ottoman and stair seating installation in Battery Park City, prior to their planned removal

The Battery Park City Authority, which manages the planning of the neighborhood, announced that the stone ottomans and stair seating Burton designed for the North Cove plaza would be relocated in 2025 for the construction of a flood wall and to increase accessibility, although the other elements would stay in place.

== Artistic style, influences, and analysis ==
A variety of critics and art historians have written about Burton's exploration and dissolution of aesthetic boundaries, especially the traditional division between fine art and utilitarian design through his furniture sculptures. Critic John Russell described works by Burton as "sculptures that happen to serve a household purpose." John Ashbery wrote in 1978 that “Scott Burton’s eerie counterfeit furniture is very close to the real thing, but stops just beyond it.” Kay Larson called Burton “neither a formalist nor a furniture-maker, but a sculptor tossing off asides about the cultural history of design." Curator Richard Francis, writing in 1985, said that the artist "is interested instead in dislodging the definition of the category of sculpture or furniture. Burton places the object ambiguously; it is both/and furniture and sculpture, not only . . . but also.”

The art historian Robert Rosenblum described Burton as "...singular and unique as a person as he was as an artist. His fiercely laconic work destroyed the boundaries between furniture and sculpture, between private delectation and public use and radically altered the way we see many 20th-century masters, including Gerrit Rietveld and Brâncuși."

== Notable works in public collections ==
- Bronze Chair (conceived 1972, cast 1975), Art Institute of Chicago
- Public Table (1978–1979), Princeton University Art Museum, Princeton, New Jersey
- Bronze Chair (1975, replica for Donald Droll, 1979), Allen Memorial Art Museum, Oberlin, Ohio
- Untitled (Red/Yellow/Blue Cube) (1979–1980), Museum of Contemporary Art, Los Angeles
- Lava Rock Chair (1981–1982), Los Angeles County Museum of Art
- Asymmetrical Settee (conceived 1982, fabricated 1985–1986), Tate, London
- Sandstone Bench (1986), Des Moines Art Center, Des Moines, Iowa
- Seat-Leg Table (conceived 1986, fabricated 1991), Walker Art Center, Minneapolis
- Münster Benches: A Pair (conceived 1986, fabricated 1999), Ulrich Museum Wichita, Kansas
- Two-Part Chaise Lounge (1986–1987), Philadelphia Museum of Art
- Settee (1986–1987), The Broad, Los Angeles
- Two-Part Bench (a pair) (conceived 1987, fabricated 1989), San Francisco Museum of Modern Art
- Bench and Table (conceived 1988, fabricated 1991), Smart Museum of Art, Chicago
- Bench and Table (1988–1989), Carnegie Museum of Art, Pittsburgh

== Publications ==
- Burton, Scott (November 1980). "Furniture Journal: Rietveld". Art in America. Vol. 68, no. 9. pp. 102–108.
- — (1983). "Scott Burton". Design Quarterly. No. 122. Walker Art Center. pp. 10–11. JSTOR 4091074.
- — (1989). "My Brancusi". Artist's Choice: Burton on Brancusi (PDF) (Exhibition pamphlet). New York: Museum of Modern Art. pp. Unpaginated. Archived (PDF) from the original on September 9, 2025.
- — (October 15, 2015) [First published Summer 1968 as "Time on Their Hands" in ARTnews. Vol. 67, no. 4.]. "Time on Their Hands: Scott Burton on Richard Serra and Bruce Nauman's Durational Art, in 1968". ARTnews. Introduction by Greenberger, Alex.
- A more complete survey of Burton's writing was published in 2012:
  - Burton, Scott (2012). Getsy, David J. (ed.). Scott Burton: Collected Writings on Art and Performance, 1965–1975. Chicago: Soberscove Press. ISBN 9780982409046. OCLC 809616593.

== Notes, citations, and references ==
=== Cited references ===
- Amaral, Rui Mateus (2022). "Garden Court". In Goodden, Sky (ed.). Scott Burton: Garden Court (PDF). Toronto: Amaral & P. / ArtworxTO. pp. 4–16. ISBN 9781778238505. OCLC 1374847159. Archived from the original (PDF) on December 2, 2022.
- Argelander, Ronald (September 1973). "Scott Burton's Behavior Tableaux (1970–72)". The Drama Review. 17 (3). School of the Arts at New York University: 109–113. JSTOR 1144847.
- Burton, Scott; et al. (January 1980). "Situation Esthetics: Impermanent Art and the Seventies Audience". Artforum (Interview). Vol. 18, no. 5. Interviewed by Foote, Nancy.
- DeAk, Edit; Robinson, Walter, eds. (Winter 1975). "An Article on Scott Burton in the Form of a Resumé". Art-Rite. No. 8. pp. 8–10. ISSN 0736-8755. OCLC 3949627.
- Francis, Richard (1985). "Non Solum... Sed Etiam". Scott Burton. London: Tate Gallery. pp. 7–21. ISBN 094659032X. OCLC 13792786.
- Getsy, David J. (2012). "Introduction: The Primacy of Sensibility: Scott Burton writing on art and performance, 1965–1975" (PDF). In Getsy, David J. (ed.). Scott Burton: Collected Writings on Art and Performance, 1965–1975. Chicago: Soberscove Press. pp. 1–32. ISBN 9780982409046. OCLC 809616593. Archived (PDF) from the original on July 17, 2021.
- Getsy, David J. (2022). Queer Behavior: Scott Burton and Performance Art. University of Chicago Press. ISBN 9780226817064. OCLC 1274199471.
- Getsy, David J. (2025). "Public Affections: The Figurative Revelation of Scott Burton's Late Works" (PDF). In Wilcox, Jess; Smith, Heather Alexis (eds.). Scott Burton: Shape Shift. St. Louis / Chicago: Pulitzer Arts Foundation / Wrightwood 659. pp. 26–37. ISBN 9780300284133. OCLC 1514423550. Archived (PDF) from the original on December 31, 2025.
- Getsy, David J. (Fall 2025). "Appearing Asymptomatic: Scott Burton's Public Art and the Knowledge of AIDS". American Art. 39 (3). University of Chicago Press / Smithsonian American Art Museum: 54–83. doi:10.1086/738511.
- Kachur, Lewis (2015). "Re–Mastering MoMA: Kirk Varnedoe's 'Artist's Choice' Series". In Jeffery, Celina (ed.). The Artist as Curator. Bristol: Intellect. pp. 45–58. doi:10.2307/j.ctv36xvq23.7. ISBN 9781783203383. OCLC 920111181.
- Knight, Cher Krause (2015). "'Both Object and Subject': MoMA's Burton on Brancusi". In Jeffery, Celina (ed.). The Artist as Curator. Bristol: Intellect. pp. 59–78. doi:10.2307/j.ctv36xvq23.8. ISBN 9781783203383. OCLC 920111181.
- P., Paul (2022). "Scott Burton". In Goodden, Sky (ed.). Scott Burton: Garden Court (PDF). Toronto: Amaral & P. / ArtworxTO. pp. 32–47. ISBN 9781778238505. OCLC 1374847159. Archived from the original (PDF) on December 2, 2022.
- Pincus-Witten, Robert (September 1976). "Scott Burton: Conceptual Performance as Sculpture". Arts Magazine. Vol. 51, no. 1. pp. 112–117.
- Princenthal, Nancy (1989) [First published June 1987 in English in Art in America. Vol. 75, no. 6, pp. 130–136.]. "Sitzen im Sozialen Raum" [Social Seating]. In Svestka, Jiri (ed.). Scott Burton: Skulpturen 1980–89 [Scott Burton: Sculpture 1980–89] (in German and English). Translated by Allié, Manfred. Düsseldorf: Kunstverein für die Rheinlande und Westfalen. pp. 87–89. ISBN 9783925974076. OCLC 22490951.
- Princenthal, Nancy (March 2013). "High Style, Clear Form, Sharp Edge". Art in America. Vol. 101, no. 3. pp. 122–130.
- Richardson, Brenda (1986). Scott Burton. Baltimore Museum of Art. ISBN 9780912298610. OCLC 14189289.
- Smith, Heather Alexis (2025). "Artworks". In Wilcox, Jess; Smith, Heather Alexis (eds.). Scott Burton: Shape Shift. St. Louis / Chicago: Pulitzer Arts Foundation / Wrightwood 659. pp. 39–103. ISBN 9780300284133. OCLC 1514423550.
- Smith, Roberta (1989) [First published November–December 1978 in English in Art in America. Vol. 66, no. 6, pp. 138–140.]. "Scott Burton: Antwort auf den Minimalismus" [Scott Burton: Designs on Minimalism]. In Svestka, Jiri (ed.). Scott Burton: Skulpturen 1980–89 [Scott Burton: Sculpture 1980–89] (in German and English). Translated by Nusser, Uta. Düsseldorf: Kunstverein für die Rheinlande und Westfalen. pp. 51–54. ISBN 9783925974076. OCLC 22490951.
- Torres, Ana María (2004). "Scott. Chairs. Eloquently." (PDF). In Torres, Ana María (ed.). Scott Burton. Valencia: Institut Valencià d'Art Modern. pp. 12–22. ISBN 9788448237530. OCLC 55844291. Archived (PDF) from the original on November 14, 2016.
- Wilcox, Jess (2025). "Scott Burton: Inside and Out". In Wilcox, Jess; Smith, Heather Alexis (eds.). Scott Burton: Shape Shift. St. Louis / Chicago: Pulitzer Arts Foundation / Wrightwood 659. pp. 11–25. ISBN 9780300284133. OCLC 1514423550.
