= Six-Part Seating =

Sculpture by Scott Burton

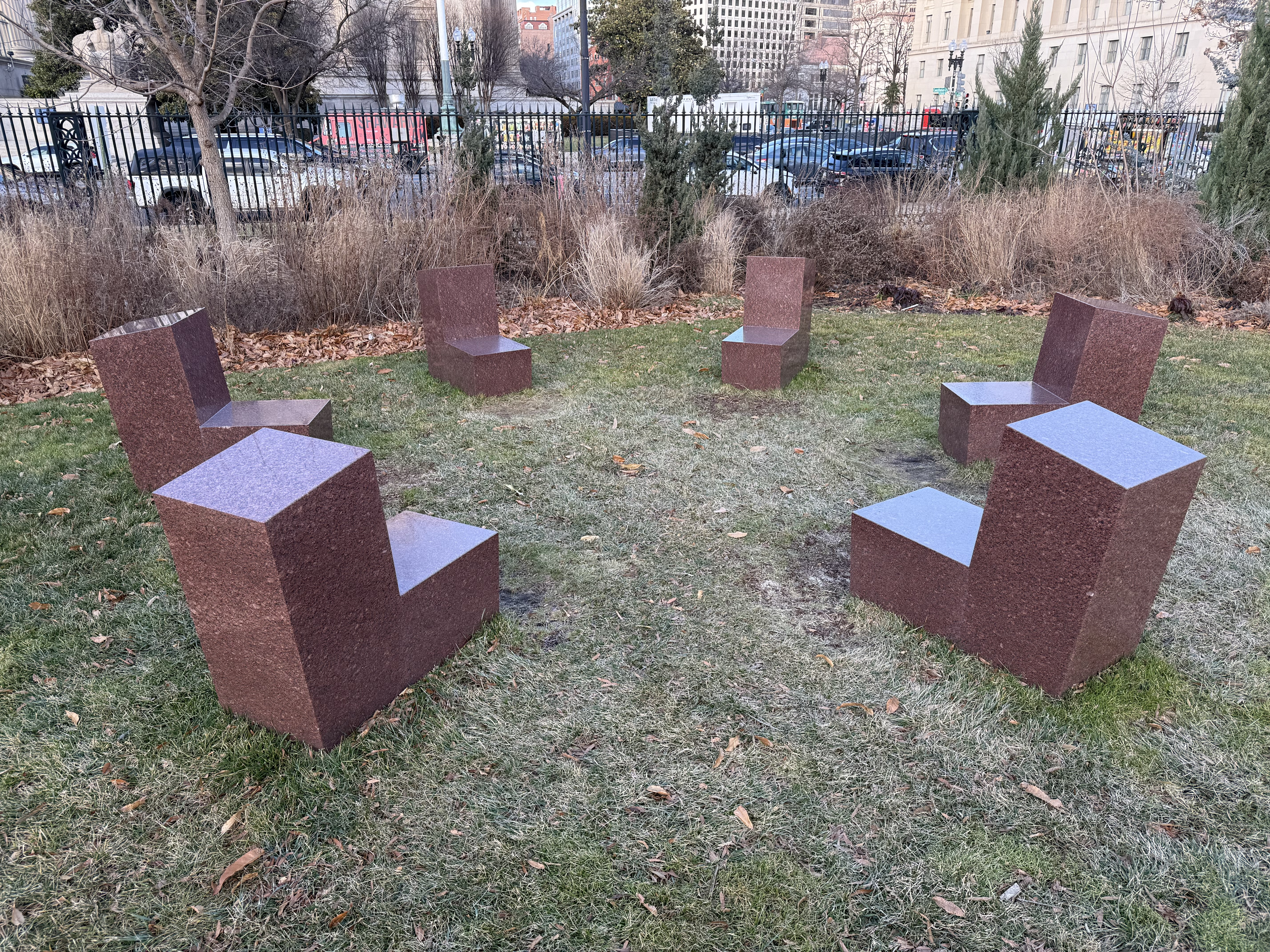
- Six-Part Seating in 2026
- Artist: Scott Burton
- Year: 1998
- Medium: granite
- Dimensions: Six elements, each 95.3 × 44.5 × 100.3 cm (37 1/2 × 17 1/2 × 39 1/2 in)
- Location: National Gallery of Art Sculpture Garden, Washington, D.C., United States; 38.891794°N 77.022481°W
- Accession: 1998.146.1

Six-Part Seating is a sculpture by Scott Burton, installed at the National Gallery of Art Sculpture Garden in Washington, D.C. The work, conceived in 1985 and fabricated in 1998, consists of six polished red granite seats that can be arranged in a circle or side by side. The seats weigh approximately 1500 pounds each. Visitors are welcome to sit on the seats. The work was given to the National Gallery of Art by the Collectors Committee.

== See also ==
- List of public art in Washington, D.C., Ward 2
