= John Gibson Gallery =

Art gallery

- Formation: November 1967
- Dissolved: 2000 (aged 28–29)
- Headquarters: New York City, New York, U.S.
- Leader: John Gibson

The John Gibson Gallery was a contemporary art gallery in New York City, in operation from November 1967 to 2000, and founded by John Gibson. Early on, the gallery specialized in selling contemporary monumental–sized sculptures.

== History ==
=== Precursor ===
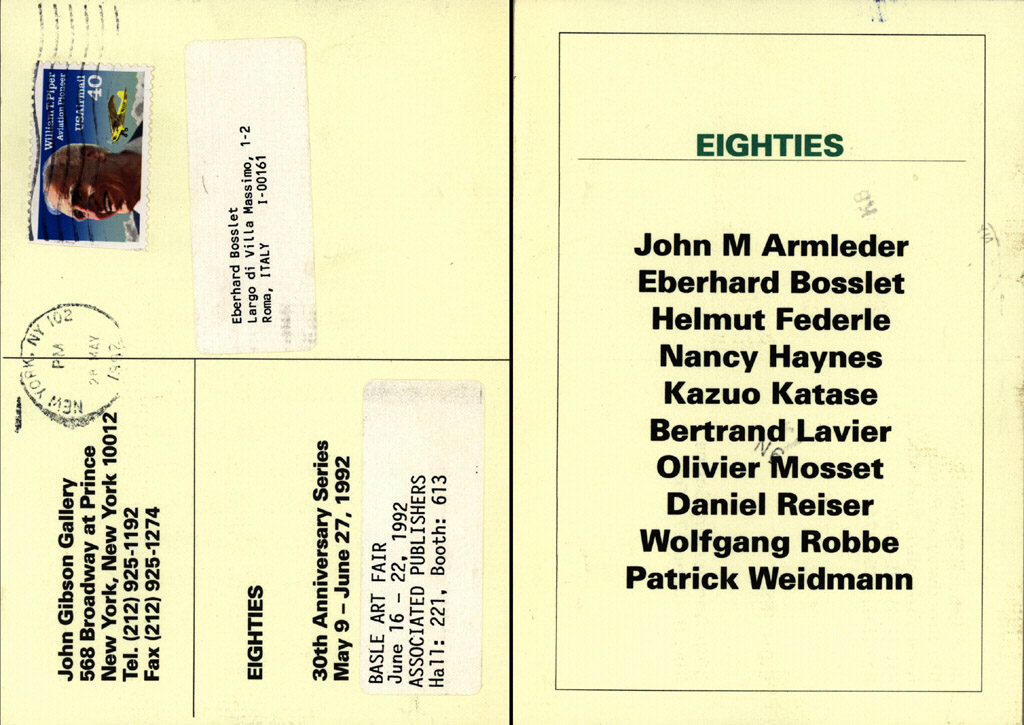
Invitation to contemporary art exhibition, Eighties (1992)

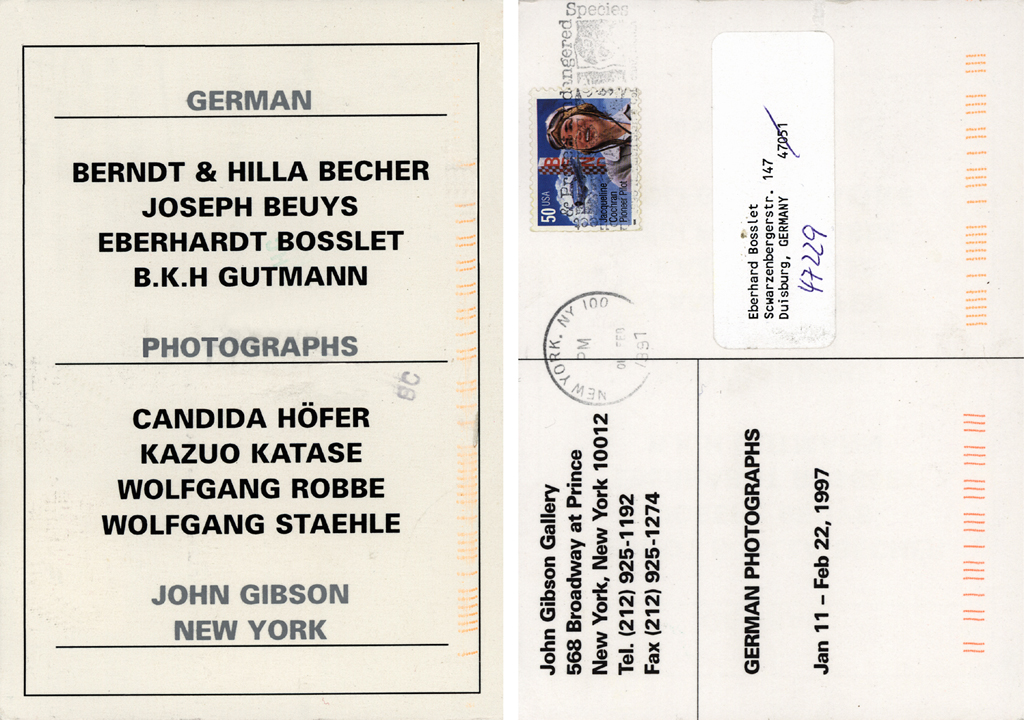
Invitation to contemporary art exhibition, German Photographers (1997)

The Park Place Gallery in New York became a center of attention for the downtown art scene and their original gallery members were all of the cutting edge. John Gibson was the first director of Park Place Gallery from 1963 to 1965. By 1966, the SoHo neighborhood of New York City had a growing artist community, and had revolutionized what was possible for young artists.

=== John Gibson Gallery ===
John Gibson later opened his own gallery in 1967, in the neighborhood of Lenox Hill. Gibson was aided in running the John Gibson Gallery by his wife, Susan Gibson. The John Gibson Gallery held its first group exhibition in November 1967, The Hanging, Floating, Cantilever Show. The first exhibition featured installation art by Donald Judd, Andy Warhol, Kenneth Snelson, Christo, Robert Morris, Forrest Myers, and Sol LeWitt. By 1972, the gallery moved locations to 392 West Broadway in Soho.

John Gibson Gallery closed in 2000, and Gibson died on March 1, 2019. The John Gibson Gallery has work in public collections such as the Harvard Art Museums.

== Artists ==
The gallery is primarily known for the Minimalist, land art, arte povera, conceptual artists and European artists it has represented and whose careers it helped launch.

- Mac Adams,
- Carl Andre,
- John Armleder,
- Arman,
- David Askevold,
- Jennifer Bartlett,
- Didler Bay,
- Joseph Beuys,
- Bill Beckley,
- Eberhard Bosslet,
- Marcel Broodthaers,
- Daniel Buren,
- James Carpenter,
- Saint Clair Cemin,
- William Childress,
- Tony Cragg,
- Christo,
- Abraham David Christian,
- Robert Cumming,
- Jan Dibbets,
- Mark di Suvero,
- Peter Fend,
- Robert Filliou,
- Dan Graham,
- Robert Grosvenor,
- Peter Halley,
- Noel Harding,
- Nancy Haynes,
- Eva Hesse,
- John Hilliard,
- Peter Hutchinson,
- Will Insley,
- Donald Judd,
- Allan Kaprow,
- Leandro Katz,
- Gerad Laing,
- Eve Andree Laramee,
- Ange Leccia,
- Jean Le Gac,
- Sol LeWitt,
- Richard Long,
- Robert Morris,
- Gordon Matta-Clark,
- Mario Merz,
- Forrest Myers,
- Olivier Mosset,
- Thom Merrick,
- Bruce Nauman,
- Claes Oldenburg,
- Dennis Oppenheim,
- Joel Otterson,
- Panamarenko,
- Steven Parrino,
- Lucio Pozzi,
- Robert Ryman,
- Richard Serra,
- Salvatore Scarpitta,
- Keith Sonnier,
- Susan Smith,
- Robert Smithson,
- Kenneth Snelson,
- Haim Steinbach,
- Niele Toroni,
- Richard Tuttle,
- Andy Warhol,
- Meg Webster,
- Lawrence Weiner,
- Roger Welch,
- Ben Vautier,
- Michael Zwack.

== Gallery locations ==
- 1967–1971, John Gibson Gallery, Projects for Commissions, 27 East 67th Street, New York City, New York, 10021
- 1972–1980, John Gibson Gallery, 392 West Broadway, New York City, New York, 10012
- 1981–1984, John Gibson Gallery, 205 East 78th Street, New York City, New York, 10021
- 1984–2000, John Gibson Gallery, 568 Broadway at Prince, New York City, New York, 10012
