= Paula Cooper Gallery =

Art gallery in Manhattan, New York

- Formation: 1968; 58 years ago
- Headquarters: 524 West 26th Street, New York City, U.S.
- Coordinates: 40°44′49.21″N 74°0′24.69″W
- Leader: Paula Cooper

The Paula Cooper Gallery is an art gallery in New York City, founded in 1968 by Paula Cooper.

== History ==
=== Predecessors ===
Cooper entered the New York art world aged 21 working at the World House Galleries on Madison Avenue. She then ran her own space, the Paula Johnson Gallery, from 1964 to 1966, where Walter De Maria launched his first solo show in New York. She worked for Park Place Gallery from 1965 to 1967, a co-operative gallery of five painters and five sculptors, including Mark di Suvero, Leo Valledor, Robert Grosvenor, and David Novros.

=== 1968–1975 ===
According to The New York Observer: "The history of Paula Cooper Gallery is, in many ways, the history of the New York art world." Cooper opened the first gallery at 96 Prince Street with $4,400 in October 1968.

“I didn’t like uptown,” Ms. Cooper told The Observer. “I thought it was just little shops. I looked downtown. And people told me that I was crazy to open there. That no one would go there.” The gallery opened with an exhibition to benefit the Student Mobilization Committee to End the War in Vietnam, working alongside Veterans Against the War; proceeds of sales were split 50-50 between the artists and the committee. The exhibition featured LeWitt’s first wall drawing, and included works by Carl Andre, Jo Baer, Dan Flavin, Donald Judd, and Robert Ryman. That show is now widely recognized as seminal in the development of a new generation of rigorous and challenging work.

By 1975, the neighborhood had been renamed SoHo, and included 83 other art galleries.

=== 1996–today ===
Cooper bought a building at 534 West 21st Street in 1995, and subsequently relocated the gallery to Manhattan's Chelsea neighborhood in 1996. The initial round of renovations was overseen by the architect Richard Gluckman. Critic Michael Kimmelman, reviewing a Carl Andre exhibition, wrote in The New York Times: "The news here is how good Paula Cooper's new gallery looks: the main room is like a big chapel. Too bad for SoHo, which Ms. Cooper, one of its pioneering dealers, recently abandoned to the hordes of retail stores."

In 2007, Paula Cooper gave the extant records of Park Place, dating from 1966 to 1967, and the early records of the Paula Cooper Gallery, from 1968 to 1973 to the Smithsonian Archives of American Art.

In 2013, Paula Cooper Gallery opened two pop-up spaces, in a former auto parts shop at 197 10th Avenue, near 22nd Street, as well as on the ground floor of 521 West 21st Street. In 2018, the gallery temporarily moved its headquarters to a 9,000-square-foot space located at 524 West 26th Street due to construction in an adjacent building.

In 2021, Paula Cooper Gallery opened a space in Palm Beach, Florida.

== The Clock (2011) ==
In February 2011, Christian Marclay's twenty-four-hour multi-visual exhibit The Clock was exhibited in the gallery space. The Clock had recently received the Golden Lion award at the 54th Venice Biennale.

Art critic Roberta Smith wrote in The New York Times: "It is ensconced in a theaterlike installation at the Paula Cooper Gallery in Chelsea, where it should not be missed...The presentation at the Paula Cooper gallery reiterates the synthetic nature of The Clock. The combination of carpeted floors, walls hung with velvet curtains and a dozen long couches lined up in four rows, with the screen high and large on the wall, evocatively conflates living room, screening room and movie theater, while even hinting at drive-in movies (the couches as parked cars)."

In The New York Observer, Michael H. Miller wrote: "[When] Ms. Cooper exhibited Christian Marclay’s 24-hour paean to cinematic history, The Clock, for several weekends, the gallery stayed open 24/7 and a line stretched around the corner into the early hours of morning...Models mingled with art handlers. Reporters and rival dealers waited patiently amongst the late-night swell of people."

== Artists ==
The gallery is primarily known for the Minimalist and Conceptual artists it has represented and whose careers it helped launch, including:

- Tauba Auerbach
- Jonathan Borofsky
- Céleste Boursier-Mougenot (since 1999)
- Cecily Brown
- Sophie Calle
- Mark di Suvero
- Sam Durant
- Ja'Tovia Gary (since 2019)
- Robert Gober
- Hans Haacke
- Ralph Lemon (since 2021)
- Eric N. Mack (since 2021)
- Christian Marclay
- Justin Matherly (since 2012)
- Walid Raad
- Rudolf Stingel
- Kelley Walker
- Meg Webster

In addition to living artists, Paula Cooper Gallery also handles the estates of the following:

- Terry Adkins (since 2021)
- Carl Andre (since 1978)
- Jennifer Bartlett (since 2018, together with Marianne Boesky Gallery)
- Bernd and Hilla Becher (since 2018)
- Sarah Charlesworth (since 2018)
- Luciano Fabro (since 2021)
- Donald Judd
- Sol LeWitt
- Elizabeth Murray

Paula Cooper Gallery has in the past represented the following:

- Lynda Benglis
- Charles Gaines
- Robert Grosvenor (–2023)
- Zoe Leonard
- Sherrie Levine (1998–2015)
- Joel Shapiro (–1992)

== Recognition ==
In 2015, Paula Cooper was awarded France’s Order of Arts and Letters, the country’s highest distinction for contributions to French arts and culture.
