= Park Place Gallery =

Art gallery in New York City (1963–1967)

- Formation: 1963
- Dissolved: 1967 (aged 3–4)
- Headquarters: 542 West Broadway, New York City, New York, U.S.
- Fields: Contemporary art

The Park Place Gallery was a contemporary cooperative art gallery, in operation from 1963 to 1967, and was located in New York City. The Park Place Gallery was a notable as a post-World War II gallery for both its location and that it supported a group of artists working with geometric abstraction and space.

It is thought to have been the first gallery of the 1960s in that area of Lower Manhattan. Park Place Gallery was located at 542 West Broadway, adjacent to the neighborhood that is now called SoHo. Originally opened as a cooperative gallery in 1963 near Park Place in Lower Manhattan, in 1965 it moved to a new and larger location at 542 West Broadway. The gallery was a large open exhibition space with an office and second showing space in the back. In general there were two-person exhibitions each featuring a painter and a sculptor in the larger front room, and a small selection of artists work in the back room.

The first director of Park Place Gallery was John Gibson who later opened his own John Gibson Gallery in the early 1970s. He was succeeded by Paula Cooper who after Park Place Gallery closed in the late 1960s opened the Paula Cooper Gallery in SoHo. She became a pioneer of the contemporary art scene and a forerunner of the population explosion of art galleries in New York City during the 1970s.

== History ==
=== Precursors ===
In the early 1960s, artists from all over the country moved to Lower Manhattan's lofts and warehouse buildings, in what used to be known as "Hells Hundred Acres", which became large and inexpensive studios. Dealers and gallery owners opened new gallery spaces nearby.

By 1966, SoHo was a growing artist community, and Park Place Gallery became a meeting ground for artists. Especially crowded and popular were the music performances and other special programs hosted by the gallery. During the mid-to-late 1960s and the early 1970s Max's Kansas City on Park Avenue South between 17th and 18th Streets and the St. Adrian's bar on lower Broadway became hangouts for young artists, writers, poets, and creative people in downtown Manhattan.

=== Early Park Place Gallery ===
The first location of the gallery was near Park Place in Lower Manhattan. The Park Place Gallery was founded in 1962 as a cooperative art gallery by 10 artists, including Mark di Suvero, Dean Fleming, Robert Grosvenor, Forrest Myers, Peter Forakis, Leo Valledor, Tamara Melcher, Tony Magar, and Edwin Ruda. The first director of the space was John Gibson (1933–2019), subsequently of John Gibson Gallery. Later artists to join the cooperative community included David Novros, Jonathan Baldwin, and Gay Glading.

The gallery showcased works by younger, less established artists with an emphasis on Geometric abstraction, shaped canvas, Hard-edge painting, Op Art, paradoxical geometric objects, sculpture, and experimental art. Many of the sculptors, painters and other artists who exhibited in Park Place Gallery were interested in cutting edge architecture, electronic music, and minimal art.

=== Later history ===
In 1965, the gallery moved to 542 West Broadway, on what is now LaGuardia Place just north of Houston Street adjacent to the neighborhood that is now called SoHo. By 1965, Paula Cooper served as director, and Park Place became a lightning rod of attention for the downtown art scene. It became a center for the downtown avant-garde as well, with weekly poetry readings, concerts by new electronic composers, and openings that always drew large crowds of young artists. They had attracted funding from the Lannan Foundation.

== Closure and legacy ==
By 1967, the gallery had closed.

In the late 1960s and early 1970s in New York City, art shattered into many directions: Conceptual art, Earth art, Lyrical abstraction, Minimal art, Postminimalism, Performance art, and the continuation of Abstract expressionism, Color field painting, Op art and Pop art. A significant development in the New York art scene was the birth of the gallery scene in SoHo, which Park Place Gallery helped define. After the closure of the gallery, director Paula Cooper took many of the experience she had at the Park Place Gallery and used that to open the Paula Cooper Gallery on 96 Prince Street in SoHo.

In September 2008, the Blanton Museum of Art at the University of Texas at Austin presented an exhibition entitled Reimagining Space: The Park Place Gallery Group in 1960s New York, curated by Linda Dalrymple Henderson. The exhibition ran from September 28, 2008, till January 18, 2009.

== Artists ==
Many of the artists who were affiliated with the gallery have been nicknamed "The Park Place Group". The Park Place Gallery exhibited the works of lesser known young and older artists, often for the first time.

=== Founders ===
The Park Place Gallery founders included:

- Mark di Suvero
- Jonathan Baldwin
- Dean Fleming
- Gay Glading
- Robert Grosvenor,
- Forrest Myers
- David Novros
- Peter Forakis
- Leo Valledor
- Tamara Melcher
- Tony Magar
- Edwin Ruda

=== Exhibitors ===
Artists who exhibited work at Park Place Gallery include:

- Carl Andre
- Jake Berthot
- Ronald Bladen
- Linda Fleming
- Charles Ginnever
- Philip Glass
- Robert Grosvenor
- Al Held
- Eva Hesse
- Joan Jonas
- Ronnie Landfield
- Bernard Kirschenbaum
- Patsy Krebs
- Sol LeWitt
- Brice Marden
- Robert Morris
- Bob Neuwirth
- David R. Prentice
- Terry Riley
- Steve Reich
- Peter Reginato
- Charles Ross
- Robert Smithson
- Kenneth Snelson
- Michael Steiner
- Sylvia Stone
- Robert Swain
- Carlos Villa
- David von Schlegell
- Mac Wells
- Neil Williams
- Mario Yrisarry

== See also ==
- Tenth street galleries
- Minimal art
- Postminimalism
- Lyrical Abstraction
- shaped canvas
- Hard-edge painting
- Impossible object
- truncated dodecahedron
- polyhedron
