= Linda Fleming =

American sculptor and university professor

- Born: 1945 (age 80–81); Pittsburgh, Pennsylvania, US
- Education: Carnegie Mellon University
- Known for: Sculpture, public art, drawing
- Spouse: Michael Moore
- Awards: Pollock-Krasner Foundation; Gottlieb Foundation; Peter S. Reed Foundation
- Website: Linda Fleming

Linda Fleming, Lightning, stainless steel and Tnemec paint, 144"h x 114"w x 69.5"d, 2022, Big Sky Community Center, Montana.

Linda Fleming (born 1945) is an American sculptor and former educator. She has been active since the late 1960s, producing abstract, monumental and miniature constructions and figurative and abstract drawings, employing materials including laser-cut steel, salvaged wood logs and beams, bronze, wool, rubber, glass and paper. Drawing inspiration from the physical world, science and imagination, her work is noted for its fluid sense of form, scale and allusion. Critics describe her sculpture as at once evocative of ephemeral, structural and cosmological phenomena: subatomic particles, the paths of stars and nebulae, human instruments and contraptions, abstract thought, webs, lace and smoke. Donna Schumacher of Sculpture observed, "Fleming has been evolving a body of work that strives to express the simultaneous realities found in the space between: between conscious and subconscious, form and matter, science and art, between this world and the one just beyond perception."

Fleming has exhibited at institutions including the Berkeley Art Museum, Denver Art Museum, International Quilt Museum, Nevada Museum of Art, Oakland Museum of California and Socrates Sculpture Park. Her work is held in the collections of the Berkeley and Oakland museums and Fine Arts Museums of San Francisco, among others.

== Biography ==
Fleming was born in 1945 in Pittsburgh, Pennsylvania. She studied art at Carnegie Mellon University and the San Francisco Art Institute before moving to New York City to become an artist in 1967. She became involved with the early SoHo art scene, including artists from the influential co-operative Park Place Gallery, such as Mark di Suvero, Dean Fleming and Frosty Myers; her work appeared in the gallery's last exhibition.

After Park Place closed, she went to Colorado with Dean Fleming to set up a rural version of the gallery with art studios. In 1968, they married and co-founded an artist community, Libre, with other artists on 360 acres in the Huerfano Valley of the Rocky Mountains. She and other members designed and built their own home-studios (in her case, a geodesic dome, then a straight-walled structure) and the community infrastructure, and created by-laws for self-governance that remain in effect more than fifty years later. Fleming has continued to spend a portion of her time living and working at Libre since its founding.

Fleming met her future husband, painter Michael Moore, in San Francisco in 1987. For more than three decades, they have traveled cyclically each year between studios and homes in the Bay Area waterfront town of Benicia, Nevada's Smoke Creek Desert, and Libre. Fleming regards the seasonal migration as key to her process, alternating between outdoor introspection and observation and the internal processing of more urban studio work.

== Work and critical reception ==
Critic David Roth summarizes the conceptual underpinnings of Fleming's work as "a mix of lyrical abstraction, inspired by the artist’s inquiries into particle physics and string theory; muscular geometry, stemming from her early association, in New York, with Mark di Suvero; and hippie utopianism." Her sculptural forms employ layered, open-weave patterns of lines and planes—intricate latticeworks or swirling curves—constructed variously from lengths or laser-cut panels of steel, reclaimed wood, wool or paper. Writers note the work's embodiment of multiple spatial properties: mass and emptiness, interior and exterior, gravity and weightlessness, stasis and flow. This quality derives in part from her fascination with phenomena like subatomic particles, which serve as the common basis of both matter and space. Such concepts inspire her to create works that viewers can at once see, see through, and see inside.

Critics have described Fleming's constructions as vernacular, handmade and "simultaneously cosmic and imprecise," noting her preference for conspicuous bolts over welding to foreground the work's fabrication. The bolts emphasize the foundational relationship in her work of part (often simple geometric forms) to whole. They mimic the way subatomic particles combine into new particles and matter, while also demonstrating how objects of one scale work at a different one when they form a new entity. Curator Lawrence Rinder commented, "Fleming conveys a feeling of the vulnerability of abstract theory, a feeling of its origins in the organic and emotionally inflected world of human imagination. Her sculptures are jerry-rigged: full of ambition and hope but stopping short of the kind of absolute pronouncement that one has come to expect from the scientific voice."

Linda Fleming, Accumulated and Readjusted, wood and steel, 68"h x 76"w x 57"d, 1993.

Fleming cultivates a fluid sense of scale by working at very large or very small dimensions that invite viewers to suspend easy comprehension and make imaginative leaps. Her maquettes can be conceived as miniaturized models of vast structures or intergalactic phenomena, while her room-size sculptures might be enlarged representations of minuscule molecular designs. Point of view also plays a role; viewers may imagine themselves shrinking to enter maquette or holding a massive sculpture in their hand (from a distance), before examining it up close as an object and finally entering it as a structure. Confounding perception further, scale and mass don't correlate in Fleming's work, as is typical; delicate maquettes can project solidity and weightiness, while large metal sculptures appear weightless.

=== Bodies of work and exhibitions ===
In her first two decades, Fleming explored how complex constructions evolve out of simple forms. She assembled these outdoor and indoor works out of raw, found objects—initially, salvaged wood beams, planks and timber—creating something new out of old, while retaining visible evidence of the material's history (e.g., X-Rays, 1980; Accumulated and Readjusted, 1993). Fleming exhibited the work in early shows as well as two retrospectives: "Wilderness Study Area" (1995, Oakland Museum Sculpture Court) and "Tangible Mind" (2016, California College of the Arts).

In the 1990s, with the intention of making her work at once more durable, airy and light-reflective, she turned to large lattice-like, steel constructions. Equally composed of space and matter, her steel sculptures have been described in human-made terms as suggesting prototypes of ancient scientific instruments, abandoned contraptions, old trusses or the Eiffel Tower. The Cloak of the Motion (1996) was likened to a climbable rocket or upside-down merry-go-round; the joined steel beams in Insinuation (1997) and Necklace (2000) were compared to suspended obelisks, a "crane fallen in a heap," and 19th-century bridgework.

Two shows at Linda Durham Contemporary Art signaled Fleming's turn from the human-made to the metaphysical. In "Parallel Universe" (2003), large sculptures, a glass-enclosed maquette and a painting together posited an alternative reality centered on a cohesive, otherworldly aesthetic of universal forms. The large, fan-like rust-colored structure Intricacy was composed of complex, interwoven patterns of bolted steel that were echoed by Dark Matter, a large, flattened floor piece in black rubber. To similar effect, the open-weave, colored enamel-edged, steel configurations of "(Dis)Integrated Ingredients" (2004) mixed curved and straight lines to suggest flying saucer-like infrastructures (e.g., Pink Wobble, Green Lace).

Linda Fleming, Reverie, powder-coated steel, 138"h x 312"w x 240”d, 2008, International Quilt Center, Lincoln, NE.

In the mid-2000s, the advent of laser-cutting technology enabled Fleming to sculpt with curved rather than straight lines. She assembled undulating, monochrome panels of bolted steel filigree into lacy, see-through structures like the fan-like Gray Matter or the public commission Reverie (2008, International Quilt Museum). Light and how it moved through, over and around forms, or cast intricate, shifting shadows, took precedence in these works. Fleming exhibited such sculptures alongside maquettes in shows at Brian Gross Fine Art (2006) and Lemmons Contemporary (2008). Noting the co-mingling of ornamental, architectonic and feminist inclinations, San Francisco Chronicle critic Kenneth Baker commented, "Fleming voices a kind of gendered complexity and immensity in sculpture not attempted by an American sculptor since Nancy Graves."

In her exhibitions "Modeling the Universe" (Nevada Museum of Art, 2011) and "Drawn To/Drawn From" (2012, Oats Park Art Center), Fleming's maquettes and drawings, respectively, came to the fore. The former show displayed 40 balsa, paper, bronze and rusted metal structures resembling folded, hand-cut paper doilies that shifted the work's frame of reference toward ephemeral flows of air, particles, energy, thought and sound. The drawing retrospective highlighted biomorphic, radial shapes—some layered over entirely realistic depictions (e.g., a rock formation)—that were repeated in a thick, felt floorwork, Puddle (2012). "Making Places" (2013) was an eclectic joint exhibition documenting the work, nomadic histories and constructed spaces of Fleming and Michael Moore, through artworks, journals, video and everyday ephemera.

Critics observe that later exhibitions of large, colorful steel works contrast three-dimensional structures conveying a sense of postmodern mutability with two-dimensional wall pieces tending toward bold geometry and certitude. The two-dimensional works, like Voltage (2016) and Lightning Cloud (2017), mix intertwined curves and angular forms to evoke a laser-like energy. Others combine geometric form with color experiments using chromed steel or sections of contrasting color that optically blend (e.g., Heat Lightning, 2016; Orogeny, 2022). In the three-dimensional, floor-mounted sculptures (e.g., Lightning or Valley Fog, 2022), Fleming encourages multiple viewing angles by doubling each section with an exact complementary interior shape bolted on and painted in contrasting or close-value colors; the method creates two distinct versions of each object coexisting in the exact space—inside and outside.

== Teaching ==
Fleming is professor emeritus at California College of the Arts (CCA) after teaching there from 1986 to 2017, including twenty years as head of the sculpture department. In 2016, she received the International Sculpture Center's Outstanding Educator Award. Her teaching method has been described as holistic in its emphasis on personal exploration and the life and responsibilities of the artist. Prior to CCA, she taught at the San Francisco Art Institute, Minneapolis College of Art and Design and San Francisco State University, among other schools.

== Recognition and collections ==
Fleming has received grants and awards from the Pollock-Krasner Foundation (2023, 1993), Peter S. Reed Foundation (2007), Adolph and Esther Gottlieb Foundation (1994), La Vie des Formes (1991), Art Matters (1986) and the Athena Foundation (1983). She has had solo exhibitions at the Denver Botanic Gardens, KANEKO, Nevada Museum of Art, and Sonoma Valley Museum of Art, among others. She has created public art installations at Art Omi, the Berkeley Art Museum, Franconia Sculpture Park, International Quilt Museum, Laumeier Sculpture Park, the Oakland Museum, and Runnymede Sculpture Farm.

Fleming's work is held in the collections of the Albuquerque Museum, Berkeley Art Museum, Cantor Arts Center], Fine Arts Museums of San Francisco, Laumeier Sculpture Park, Michigan State University, Oakland Museum of California, Santa Clara University, Sheldon Museum of Art, Socrates Sculpture Park, U.S. Department of State, and University of Wyoming, among others.
