= Western Washington University Public Sculpture Collection =

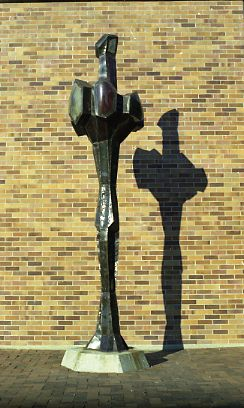
Scepter (1966) by Steve Tibbetts

The Western Washington University Outdoor Sculpture Collection is a public sculpture collection founded in 1960. The collection contains thirty-six public sculptures spanning 190 acres of the Western Washington University campus.

== History ==
In 1957, the board of trustees of Western Washington University established a policy that encouraged public art on the campus. The first work added to the collection, commissioned by Paul Thiry, was James Fitzgerald's Rain Forest, in 1960.

Campus architect Ibsen Nelsen commissioned Isamu Noguchi's "Skyviewing Sculpture" in the 1960s.

Funding for the acquisition of the works in the collection came from a combination of sources that included the state's one percent for art law, The Virginia Wright Fund, and the National Endowment for the Arts

The collection is overseen by the director of the university's Western Art Gallery. As of 2015, the director of the collection is Hafþór Yngvason.

== Sculptures in the collection ==
1. "Rain Forest (1959)," by James FitzGerald
2. "Totem (1962)," by Norman Warsinske
3. "Wall Relief" (1962), by Norman Warsinske
4. "Scepter" (1966), by Steve Tibbetts
5. "Sky Viewing Sculpture" (1969), by Isamu Noguchi
6. "Steam Work for Bellingham-II, by Robert Morris
7. "Alphabeta Cube" (1972), by Fred Bassetti
8. "The Man Who Used to Hunt Cougars for Bounty" (1972), by Richard Beyer
9. "Log Ramps" (1974; 1987), by Lloyd Hamrol
10. "For Handel" (1975), by Mark di Suvero
11. "India" (1976), by Anthony Caro
12. "Sasquatch" (1976), by Rod Pullar
13. "Flank II" (1978), by Mia Westerlund Roosen
14. "Garapata" (1978), by John Keppelman
15. "Mindseye" (1978), by Mark di Suvero
16. "Stone Enclosure: Rock Rings" (1978), by Nancy Holt
17. "Curve / Diagonal" (1979), by Robert Maki
18. "Normanno Column" (1980), by Beverly Pepper
19. "Normanno Wedge" (1980), by Beverly Pepper
20. "Wright's Triangle" (1980), by Richard Serra
21. "Untitled Box" (1982), by Donald Judd
22. "Bayview Station" (1987), by George Trakas
23. "The Islands of the Rose Apple Tree Surrounded by the Oceans of the World for You, Oh My Darling" (1987), by Alice Aycock
24. "Two-part Chairs, Right Angle Version (A Pair)" (1987), by Scott Burton
25. "Untitled" (1989), by Ulrich Rückriem
26. "Untitled" (1990), by Meg Webster
27. "Manus" (1994), by Magdalena Abakanowicz
28. "Feats of Strength" (1999), by Tom Otterness
29. "Stadium Piece" (1999), by Bruce Nauman
30. "Bigger Big Chair" (2006), by David Ireland
31. "Burning Island" (2014), by Keaton Martin
32. "Nooksack Middle Fork" (2016), by Claude Zervas

== See also ==
- Public Art
