= Rainforest (disambiguation) =

A rainforest is a forest characterized by high rainfall

Rainforest or rain forest may also refer to:

== Music ==
- Rain Forest, 1976 album and song by Biddu
- Rain Forest (Jeremy Steig and Eddie Gómez album), 1980
- Rain Forest (Walter Wanderley album), 1966
- Rain Forest (Paul Hardcastle album), 1985 album by Paul Hardcastle
- "Rainforest", 2021 song by Noname
- Rainforest (album), 1989 album by Robert Rich
- Rainforest (EP), 2011 EP by Clams Casino

== Other ==
- Rainforest Cafe, a restaurant chain owned by Landry's
- Rainforest (novel), 1987 novel by Jenny Diski
- Rain Forest (1959), a bronze fountain/sculpture by James FitzGerald

== See also ==
- FernGully: The Last Rainforest, 1992 animated feature film
- Rainforest people(s) of Australia
- Temperate rainforest, rainforest located in temperate zone
- Tropical rainforest, rainforest located in the tropics
