= Gordon Chandler =

American sculptor (born 1953)

Gordon Chandler (born 1953) is an American sculptor who was born in Springfield, Massachusetts. He attended the Skowhegan School of Painting and Sculpture 1974 before receiving a BFA in sculpture from Syracuse University (1975) and an MFA in sculpture from the University of Massachusetts Amherst (1998).

Chandler creates kimono, usable furniture, and various sculptures out of salvaged metal.

== Collections ==
His Bench No. 1690, in the collection of the Honolulu Museum of Art is an example of his salvaged metal furniture. His work is included in the collections of the Georgia Museum of Contemporary Art, the Chattahoochee Valley Art Museum (LaGrange, Georgia), the Honolulu Museum of Art, the National Ornamental Metal Museum (Memphis, Tennessee), and the Runnymede Sculpture Farm (Woodside, California) are among the public collections holding work by Chandler.
