= Peter Forakis =

American artist and professor (1927–2009)

- Born: September 22, 1927; Hanna, Wyoming, U.S.
- Died: November 26, 2009 (aged 82); Petaluma, California, U.S.
- Education: San Francisco Art Institute
- Known for: Sculpture
- Movement: Abstract art
- Spouse: Phyllis Yampolsky (divorced)
- Children: 3

Peter Forakis (September 22, 1927 – November 26, 2009) was an American artist and professor. He was known as an abstract geometric sculptor.

== Early life and education ==
Peter Forakis was born on September 22, 1927, in Hanna, Wyoming. The son of a Greek immigrant, he grew up on the Wyoming prairie until the age of 10 when his family moved to Oakland, California. Eventually they settled in Modesto, California.

Forakis was in the Merchant Marines from 1945 to 1950. He served in the United States Military in Korea and Japan from 1951 to 1953. He earned his B.F.A.degree in 1957 at the California School of Fine Arts (now San Francisco Art Institute).

== Art ==
In 1955, Forakis created the poster for the Six Gallery reading by Allen Ginsberg, Philip Lamantia, Michael McClure, Gary Snyder, and Philip Whalen, MCed by Kenneth Rexroth.

In 1958, Forakis moved to New York City. It was during this time in New York in the late 1950s–1960s that Forakis emerged as a prominent member of the art world, and, along with artists Mark di Suvero, Edwin Ruda, Dean Fleming, Robert Grosvenor, Anthony Magar, Tamara Melcher, Forrest “Frosty” Myers, David Novros, and Leo Valledor, he founded the Park Place Gallery (1963–1967), a unique artists’ co-op space. Park Place became the prototype for experimental art spaces of the 1970s.

Forakis was a ceaseless experimenter and was conducting his own research during the Park Place Gallery time period. Although he began as a painter, his paintings became sculpture. His work quickly evolved in a 3-dimensional direction, with a seminal series of “3D paintings” (1959–1962) consisting of brightly painted abstract constructions made from mostly found timber which literally “came off the wall.” Sadly, few of these works remain. Forakis became fascinated by geometry and his focus became sculptural. San Francisco Chronicle art critic Kenneth Baker credits Forakis as the “originator of geometry-based sculpture from the 60s”. In an article by Joanne Dickson titled “Profile: Peter Forakis” in the Winter 1981 edition of Ocular Magazine Forakis said, “Geometry…is a natural law that exists not only in my thinking and my blood, bones, and marrow, but in the universe and all its matter.” Forakis embarked on his lifelong exploration of the cube and hypercube along with Four-Dimensional theories. Since the late 1950s Peter Forakis has been a prolific producer of sculpture based on geometric shapes such as cubes, spheres, octahedrons and rhomboids. Some of his best known pieces include Daedules & Icarus (1963), Magic Box (1966) and Hyper Cube, 1967 (Walker Art Center).

In 1967 Forakis received his first monumental scale commission. Atlanta Gateway, one of the largest existing works of modern sculpture anywhere measuring 100 feet by 200 feet by 100 feet of tubular steel, spans a major traffic artery in Atlanta, Georgia’s Southwest Industrial Park.

By the early 1970s Forakis had begun experimenting with his “slots” technique, one of his signature achievements notable both as a unique language of examining geometry and for fabricating large scale works in steel without welding. Cutting slots into steel and sliding sheets together allowed large sculptures to be assembled using only gravity and the weight of the material. Archimedes Cube, (series, beginning in 1968) a signature piece for Forakis, has no welds, only slots. Of his monumental slotted sculptures are Sokar: the Egyptian Key (1974), and Jack London (1982) owned by the Oakland Museum and located in the Oakland Estuary, Oakland, California.

He exhibited his work in major sculpture exhibitions in museums including the Los Angeles County Museum of Art (LACMA) 1967 American Sculpture of the Sixties exhibition. His work has been seen on both coasts, across the US, and in Europe and Asia. He also won numerous grants.

== Death ==
Forakis died on November 26, 2009, in Petaluma, California.

== Teaching ==
- 1961-65 Brooklyn Museum Art School
- 1965 Carnegie Technical School of Architecture and Art
- 1966 Pennsylvania State University
- 1967 Cooper Union
- 1968-77 Windham College, Putney, Vermont (Chairman, Art Department) 1972-74
- 1978 School of Visual Arts, New York City
- 1980 University of California, Berkeley
- 1980-82 University of Kentucky

== Happenings ==
- 1961 Woodstock, New York
- 1962 Bridgehampton, New York
- 1962 Ergo Suits, Carnival and Art Fair, with Allan Kaprow, Woodstock, New York
- 1963 Welfare Island, New York

== Bibliography ==
- Grope Magazine, 1/1 (January 1964); 2/2 (1966)
- ARTnews, May 1960; April 1961; May 1961; November 1961; September 1962; Summer 1966; November 1966; January 1964; January 1969 (reproduction); December 1970
- David Bourdon, E-MC 2,
- ARTnews, January 1966
- Arts Magazine, September 1963; March 1967 (reproduction); November 1967; November 1962; March 1964; December 1966
- Edwin Ruda, Park Place: 1963-1967, Arts Magazine, November 1967
- Art in America, December 1964; January 1970; May 1970; November 1970; September 1970
- Carter Ratcliff, Art in America, March 1978
- Artforum, September 1970; April 1970; October 1970 (reproductions); January 1978
- Lawrence Alloway, Peter Forakis, Artforum, January 1968
- Arts Magazine, May 1978
- Henderson, Linda "Reimagining Space The Park Place Gallery Group in 1960s New York" Blanton Museum of Art, University of Texas, Austin, 2009
- Humblet, Claudine "La Nouvelle Abstraction Americaine 1950-1970" Skira, 2003
- Di Suvero, Mark, forward; Charles Ginnever; Atkinson, D. Scott; Julina Togonon ed."The Art of Peter Forakis" Togonon Gallery exhibition October 4-November 8, 2008.
- Colpitt, Frances. "Affiliations" Art in America, February 2009 p. 61

== Public collections ==
- Hirshhorn Museum and Sculpture Garden, Smithsonian, Washington, DC.;
- Dartmouth College, New Hampshire;
- Hartwood Acres Art Center, Allegheny, Pennsylvania;
- University at Buffalo Art Galleries;
- University of Kentucky Art Museum;
- Oakland Museum, Oakland, California;
- Berkeley Art Museum, Berkeley, California;
- San Francisco Museum of Modern Art, San Francisco, California;
- Denver Art Museum, Denver, Colorado;
- Fort Wayne Museum of Art, Fort Wayne, Indiana;
- Interland Executive Park, Walnut Creek, California;
- Stamford Museum and Nature Center, Stamford, Connecticut;
- Walker Art Center, Minneapolis, Minnesota
- Petaluma, California Sonoma–Marin Area Rail Transit train station;
