= Charles Ginnever =

American sculptor (1931–2019)

Charles Albert Ginnever (August 28, 1931 – June 16, 2019), also known as Chuck Ginnever, was an American sculptor, known primarily for large-scale abstract steel sculptures that defy simple understanding, as the works seem to constantly change form as one moves around them in time and space.

== Early life ==
Charles Albert Ginnever was born on August 28, 1931, in San Mateo, California.

In 1953, he traveled to Paris, where he attended classes taught by the sculptor Ossip Zadkine at the Académie de la Grande Chaumière. His European tour lasted two years, during which time he travelled throughout France and Italy and absorbed as much as he could from the many museums he visited. Upon returning to his native California, he enrolled at the California School of Fine Arts, (now the San Francisco Art Institute) where he studied photography and sculpture from 1955 to 1957, and where he befriended the sculptor Peter Forakis.

1957 was a pivotal year for Ginnever, when he drove from San Francisco to New York City with fellow sculptor Mark di Suvero. On the week-long cross-country journey, Ginnever and di Suvero spent their time discussing abstract expressionism and concluded that sculpture "hadn't matched the accomplishments in painting", and they were determined to correct that. Dropping di Suvero off in New York City, Ginnever continued on to Cornell University, where he had accepted a teaching position and where he simultaneously completed his MFA in 1959. It was during this period that Ginnever, inspired by calligraphy, made such seminal works as Oxbow, Calligraphic Sculpture, and Ithaca, all incorporating found materials such as wood, railroad ties and steel, which not only marked his departure from the "carve-direct/modeling orientation to sculpture" from which he and di Suvero initially evolved, but paved the way to a new form of sculptural expression where sculpture not only occupied space but, according to Carter Ratcliff, did so by "reaching into it". This would prove to be the defining moment in Ginnever's career when his sculpture would eliminate its reliance on the pedestal or base.

After the incorporation of found, bent steel pieces in his railroad tie sculpture of 1959 entitled Ithaca, which he started while still at Cornell and completed after moving to New York City, steel became the primary medium for his work, and has remained so ever since.

== 1960s ==
In the early 1960s, Ginnever's sculpture, much like that of his acquaintance and contemporary John Chamberlain, included "buckled and crunched automobile skins – hoods and fenders – combined with warped, distorted skeletal members of demolished buildings" and in Ginnever's case, sometimes incorporating painted fabric. But, whereas Chamberlain relied on the color of the found metal objects for their color composition, Ginnever painted his pieces to achieve their color compositions (a technique that Chamberlain would utilize in his later pieces). Also, whereas Chamberlain's pieces relied on their forms being crunched and are somewhat static, Ginnever's incorporated open volumes delineated by the sculptures' elements which included crunched steel. The combination of open and closed forms in Ginnever's sculptures then becomes animated by the viewer's participation when walking around the piece.

The idea of the viewer as an active participant was brought to its apex in the "Happening", an art form whose name was coined by artist Allan Kaprow. In 1962, Ginnever produced and directed Ergo Suits, a "multimedia many-act event, best described as a 'happening'", that was held first in Woodstock and then Bridgehampton, New York in the same summer. Among the many artists and performers Ginnever invited to participate in his artist carnival were Allan Kaprow, Walter de Maria, Peter Forakis, Tom Doyle, Eva Hesse, and the Bread and Puppet Theater. One of the many events of Ginnever's artist carnival included a "Sculpture Dance", in which Ginnever, Tom Doyle and Eva Hesse took part, and each of the artists made their own wearable sculptures. This event marked Hesse's first sculpture and Ginnever's first foray into the art of Happenings.

The sixties saw the emergence of both Minimal and Conceptual art, among other important art movements and although Ginnever's own work does not fall under the rubric of those movements, he was an active participant in them. In 1968, while head of the art department at Windham College in Vermont, Ginnever invited artists Carl Andre, Robert Barry and Lawrence Weiner to create site-specific outdoor works that were exhibited on the campus of the college. The exhibition included a symposium hosted by Ginnever and moderated by Dan Graham, in which the artists were given the opportunity to speak about their work. This event, transcribed and disseminated throughout the art world by the freelance curator Seth Siegelaub, had lasting effects on the movement and marked important milestones in the careers of the artists who participated. Known as "The Windham Show," it was the first commissioned conceptual art exhibit in the United States.

== 1970s ==
Ginnever's 1964-65 sculpture Dante's Rig, his first made from purchased materials, marked another important turning point in his career and set the stage for much of his later work. According to Carol Squiers, "Dante's Rig explored non-western art ideas, especially about perspective," and "spawned a series of pieces based on the support system itself, and another series based on the aluminum sections, which foreshadowed his interest in 'forced illusory perspective'". From Dante's Rig, one can clearly see a linear progression in his major works from the 1970s and 1980s. Squiers goes on to say,

By solidifying the negative space in Fayette, 1966-71, Ginnever produced Détente, 1974. In the same way, by heightening the Renaissance perspective of the framework of Ithaca, he made Zeus, 1975, and Wakanhdi, 1976. Three Steel Plates, 1977, is a combination of both these derivations. Three cor-ten steel plates, each 5/8" X 5' X 22', are hung from steel cables and shackled together in a zigzag pattern. Each touches the floor at one end and then angles up, recalling both the slanted negative space of his "squashed box" pieces (Fayette, Troika), and the exaggerated perspectival lunges of Zeus and Wakanhdi, which extend and flatten space all at once. The sheets, poised on one point, each deceptively deny their own extreme weight.

By the late 1970s, Ginnever was also among the first members of ConStruct, the artist-owned gallery that promoted and organized large-scale sculpture exhibitions throughout the United States. Other founding members included John Raymond Henry, Kenneth Snelson, Lyman Kipp and Mark di Suvero.

Ginnever has been preoccupied with the notion of western perspective for many years, and continuously challenges the viewers of his work in this respect. Ginnever states, "The sculpture is not made to trick anybody. It's just that [in] the way they are placed, they challenge our perception. Renaissance perspective was invented to help painters and draftsman extend the appearance of depth on the picture plane. Perspective has nothing to do with how forms of sculpture actually appear. Yet we expect things to behave in a certain way, which my sculptures intentionally refuse to do." As Mary Maggini points out in a catalogue essay about Ginnever's work, by "manipulating the appearance of depth and dimension, movement, and space", Ginnever presents the viewer with "a different work of art that vacillates between flattening into a one dimensional plane to expanding, or sometimes exploding, into three dimensions." Thus, when walking around one of Ginnever's sculptures, viewers are challenged when what they thought they would see at another viewpoint turns out to be a completely different form from what they expected, and they are left questioning if they are even viewing the same piece.

== Later work ==
Most of Ginnever's sculptures since the early 1990s are capable of assuming multiple positions while retaining their integrity in each position. Writing about these works, J.R. Leibowitz states, "An artist reviewing the Ginnever sculpture would immediately recognize that it works in every direction; in any pose, artistic weight is balanced." One such piece, entitled Rashomon, is capable of assuming 15 different positions. Titled after a film by Akira Kurosawa that tells the same story four times from four distinct perspectives, Ginnever's Rashomon "slips from whatever mental grasp of it a viewer may have won" whenever it is placed in a new position.

In 2000, Kenneth Baker sums up Ginnever's work for the past three decades by stating, "His intention for Rashomon is as elemental as its design. In a society in which the integration of space and time is consigned to the realm of idea rather than that of direct physical experience, the work proposes to return human perception to its original state." In a 2012 review, Baker described Rashomon as "the best unheralded idea of the twentieth century."

== Death ==
Ginnever continued to work on sculpture, drawings and printmaking, primarily at the studios on his sculpture farm in Putney, Vermont. He died there on June 16, 2019.

== Education and distinctions ==
1949–1951, San Mateo Junior College, San Mateo, California; A.A. degree
1953, Alliance Francaise, Paris, France
1954, Universita per Stranieri, Perugia, Italy
1953–1955, Academie de la Grande Chaumiere, Paris, France; under Ossip Zadkine
1955, Atelier 17, Paris, France; under Stanley W. Hayter
1955–1957, California School of Fine Arts (now San Francisco Art Institute); B.F.A. degree
1957–1959, Cornell University, Ithaca, New York; M.F.A. degree

== Large works ==
=== United States ===
==== Arizona ====
- Untitled, 1987, Private collection, Paradise Valley

==== California ====
- Ascension, 1990, Private collection, Los Angeles
- Bop, 1980, Foss Creek Pathway, Healdsburg (on loan)
- Canada, 1989, Private collection, Los Angeles
- Chicago Triangles, 1979, Littlefield Center, Stanford
- Cobra, 1984, Triton Museum of Art, Santa Clara (on loan)
- Crab, 1982, diRosa Collection, Sonoma
- Crazed, 1980, Foss Creek Pathway, Healdsburg (on loan)
- Dementia, 1989/98, Voigt Family Foundation, Geyserville (on loan)
- Didymous, 1987, Runnymede Sculpture Farm, Woodside
- Gemini, 1987, Bedford Properties
- Geyserville Zip, 2005, Voigt Family Foundation, Geyserville
- Gyro I, 1982, Voigt Family Foundation, Geyserville (on loan)
- Hangover II, 1982, Juilliard Park, Santa Rosa (on loan)
- Heavy Metal, 1983, Swift Realty, Concord
- Ibis, 1987, Runnymede Sculpture Farm, Woodside
- Kitsune, 1990, Runnymede Sculpture Farm, Woodside
- Low Rider, 1984, Fisher Collection, Atherton
- Luna Moth Walk I, 1982, Meyer Library, Stanford University
- Luna Moth Walk I, Verso, 1983, Luna Moth Walk II, 1985, and Luna Moth Walk III, 1981, Voigt Family Foundation, Geyserville (on loan)
- Pas de Deux (bronze), Voigt Family Foundation, Geyserville
- Pas de Deux (steel), 1991, Hawkwood Farm, Petaluma (on loan)
- Python, 1980, Runnymede Sculpture Farm, Woodside
- Rashomon (3 units), 1998, Di Rosa Collection, Napa
- San Mateo Bridge, 1978, City of San Mateo
- Slant Rhyme #17, Private collection, Tiburon
- Slant Rhyme Series #20, 1992, San Jose Institute of Contemporary Art, San Jose (on loan)
- Split II, 1987, Koll-Bernal Associates, Pleasanton
- Squared, 1986, Private Collection, Fullerton
- Squared II, 1987, Koll Center, Bernal Corporate Park, Pleasanton
- Stack, 1985, Hughes Aircraft, Los Angeles
- Stretch II, 1985, Orange County Museum of Art, Newport Beach
- Tandem, 1969/89, UCSF Medical Center, San Francisco (on loan)
- The Three Graces, 1975–81, Littlefield Center, Stanford
- Troika, 1976, San Francisco Museum of Modern Art, San Francisco
- Untitled, 1980, Private collection, San Francisco
- Untitled, 1985, Private collection, Atherton
- Untitled (In Homage to My Father), 1985, Palo Alto
- Virgo, 1986, Private collection, Santa Monica
- Zeus II, 1992, Runnymede Sculpture Farm, Woodside

==== Colorado ====
- Rashomon (3 units), 1993/98, Private collection, Evergreen
- Rashomon (prototype), 1993/98, Private collection, Colorado Springs

==== Connecticut ====
- Charites, 1975/80, Westport Library, Jesup Green, Westport
- White Flat, 1963, Wadsworth Athenaeum, Hartford

==== District of Columbia ====
- Ascension II, 1991, Metropolitan Square
- Maquette for Protagoras, 1976, National Museum of American Art, Smithsonian Institution, Washington
- Midas & Fog, 1966, Private collection
- Untitled, 1968, Hirshhorn Museum and Sculpture Garden, Washington
- Untitled (Squares), 1968, Hirshhorn Museum and Sculpture Garden, Washington
- Untitled, 1968, National Museum of American Art, Smithsonian Institution, Washington

==== Florida ====
- Forth Bridge, 1979, Private collection, Miami
- Half Stretch, 1982, American University
- Hangover, 1982, Martin Z. Margulies collection (on loan), Miami Dade College - Kendall Campus, Miami

==== Illinois ====
- Blue and Black, 1979, Park 470 Foundation, Chicago
- Icarus, 1975, Nathan Manilow Sculpture Park, Governor's State University, University Park

==== Louisiana ====
- The Bird (for Charlie Parker), 1979, K & B Corporation, New Orleans

==== Massachusetts ====
- Texas Triangles, 1983, DeCordova Museum and Sculpture Park, Lincoln
- Untitled, Private collection, Lowell

==== Michigan ====
- Daedalus, 1977, University of Michigan Museum of Art, Ann Arbor

==== Minnesota ====
- Model for Nautilus, 1976, Walker Art Center, Minneapolis
- Nautilus, 1976, Walker Art Center, Minneapolis
- Protagoras, 1976, General Services Administration, U.S. Courthouse, St. Paul
- Rubenstein, 1984, James Ford Bell Research Center, General Mills, Inc., Minneapolis

==== Missouri ====
- Crete, 1978, Laumeier International Sculpture Park, St. Louis
- Knossos, 1990, Nelson Atkins Museum, Kansas City

==== Nebraska ====
- Shift, 1985, Sheldon Memorial Art Museum and Sculpture Garden, Lincoln

==== Nevada ====
- Gallop-a-Pace, 1979, City of Reno
- Slant Rhyme #18, 1993, Private collection, Lake Tahoe

==== New Jersey ====
- Marcel's Wave, Private collection, Lebanon
- Scorpio, 1990, Grounds for Sculpture, Hamilton

==== New Mexico ====
- Troika II, 2008, Private collection, Santa Fe

==== New York (state) ====
- 3+1, 1967, Metropolitan Museum of Art, New York
- 1971, 1971, Storm King Art Center, Mountainville
- Apollo, 1985, ART OMI (on loan)
- Atlantis, 1981, State University of New York, Buffalo
- Fayette: For Charles and Medgar Evers, 1971, Storm King Art Center, Mountainville
- Koronos, 1978, SUNY, Purchase
- Prospect Mountain Project (For David Smith), 1979, Storm King Art Center, Mountainville
- Slant Rhyme #21, 1993, Private collection, Poundridge
- Untitled, 1970, Private collection, Woodstock
- Walkabout, 1987, Private collection, Poundridge

==== North Carolina ====
- Dovecotes, 1972, City of Winston-Salem

==== Ohio ====
- Dansa, 1981, Cleveland Lakefront State Park, Cleveland
- Movin' on for Jesse Owens, 1980, Dave Hall Plaza, Dayton
- Split II, 1973, Hobart Urban Nature Preserve, Troy

==== Oregon ====
- Tie, 1969, Private collection, Portland

==== Pennsylvania ====
- Abacus, 1968, Private collection, Bryn Mawr
- Detente, 1974, Private collection, Chester Springs
- Stretch, 1980–81, Hartwood Acres Park, Allegheny County

==== Texas ====
- Pisa, 1984, Spring Valley Center Management, SVC Leasing & Management, Dallas, Texas
- Pueblo Bonito, 1974–77, Knox Triangle, Houston
- Troika, 1978, Science and Research Building 2, University of Houston, Houston

==== Vermont ====
- 4 the 5th (of Beethoven), 1972, Landmark College, Putney (on loan)
- 30 outdoor installations, Artist's farm, Westminster

==== Washington ====
- Azuma, 1987, Walla Walla Foundry, Walla Walla (on loan)
- Les Funambules, 1988, Private Collection, Belleview
- Oxbow, 1959/2011, Walla Walla
- Troika, 1976–77, Seattle Art Museum, Seattle

==== West Virginia ====
- Charleston Arch, 1980, U.S. Post Office, Charleston

==== Wisconsin ====
- Olympus, 1976, Lynden Sculpture Garden, Milwaukee

==== Wyoming ====
- Ayatollah II, 2009, Private collection, Teton Village
- Slant Rhyme 5A, 1994, Private collection, Teton Village
- Steel Squared, 1983, Private collection, Teton Village
- Steel Squared, 1986, Private collection, Jackson Hole

=== International ===
==== Australia ====
- Green Mountain Blue II, 1978, Australian National Gallery, Canberra
- Midas II, 1978, Vaucluse, New South Wales

==== Philippines ====
- Nike, 1996, APEC Sculpture Garden, PICC, Manila

=== Other work ===
- Calligraphic Sculpture, 1958
- Dante's Rig, 1964–65
- Ghost of Isenheim, 1961
- Godard's Dream, 1982
- Gothic Series #1, 1965
- Ithaca, 1959
- Koronos II, 1978
- Lavade (for Linda), 1974
- M.P. #2, 2005
- M.P. #3, 2005
- Mobius #1, 2005
- Moonwalker I, 1989
- Moonwalker IV, 1991
- Moonwalker V, 1991
- Moonwalker VI, 1991
- No Place to Hide, 1986
- Satellite (for Ronald Bladen), 1987
- Stack, 1985
- Tandem II, 1980
- Three Steel Plates, 1977
- Torque, 1990
- Untitled, 1966
- Untitled, 1971
- Untitled (A/P), 1986
- Untitled, Herculoy, 1986
- Wakanhdi, 1975
- Zeus, 1975
