= The Wall (SoHo) =

Minimalist artwork in Manhattan, New York, US

Coordinates: 40°43′31″N 73°59′49″W

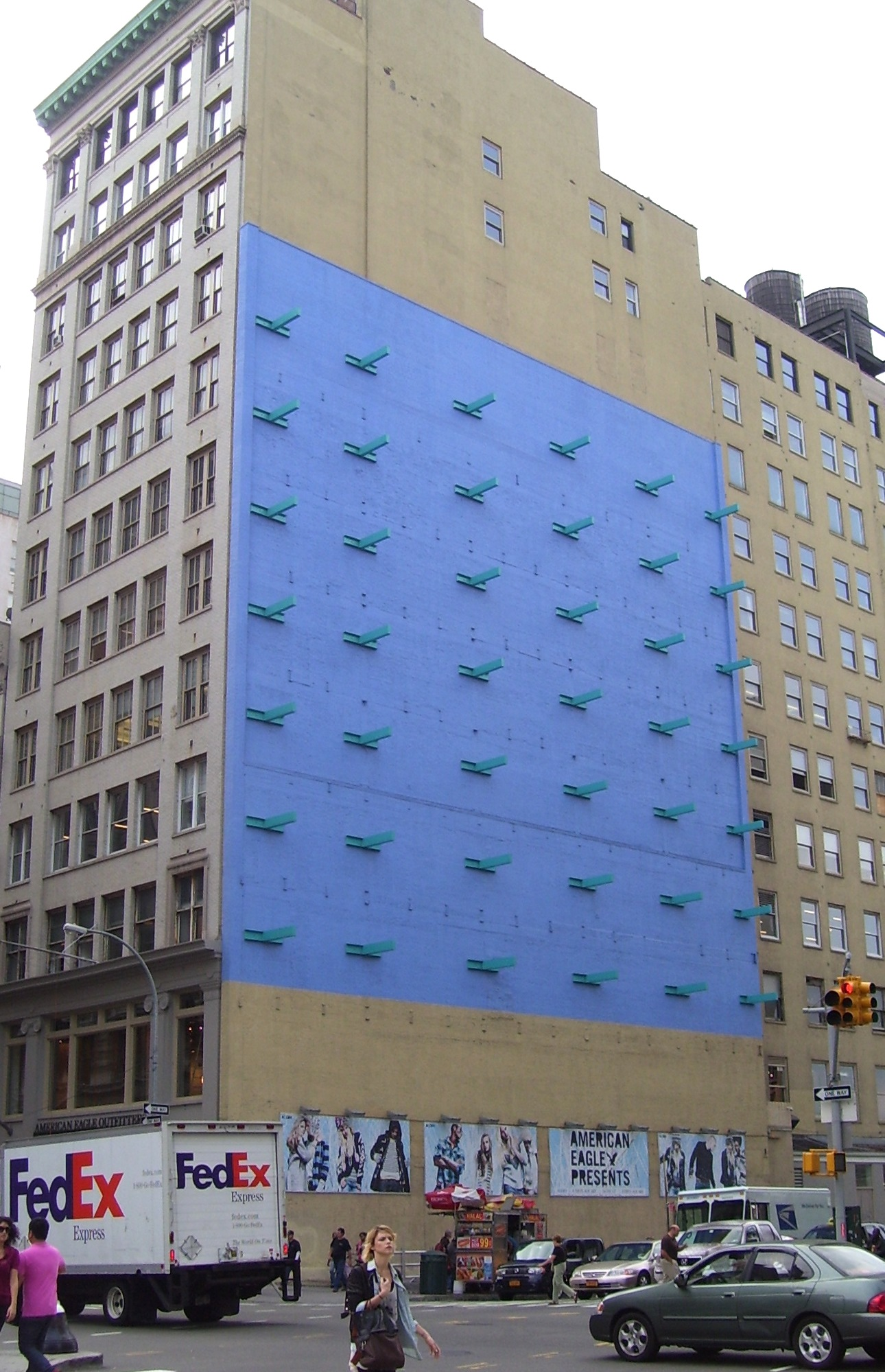
The Wall, also known as The Gateway to Soho

The Wall, also known as The Gateway to Soho, is a piece of minimalist art that was constructed in the SoHo neighborhood of Manhattan, New York City. It was part of the building that stands at 599 Broadway until 2002 when the New York City Landmarks Preservation Commission (LPC) gave the owners permission to take it down so the interior wall could be repaired. The artwork has since been re-installed.

== The artwork ==
The Wall was built in 1973 by Forrest Myers under a $2,000 commission by the now defunct City Walls, Inc. It consists of "42 aluminum bars bolted to steel braces and painted green on a periwinkle background" and takes up 3/4 of the building's wall. It stands about 8 stories high.

The piece was originally commissioned to "cover existing architectural scars" from when Houston Street was widened at the expense of an adjoining building. Myers has explained that, symbolically, the piece reflects the transformations during SoHo's artistic history while remaining a reminder that the neighborhood "still represents the spirit of the artists from those days."

== Removal and re-installation ==
The owners of 599 Broadway complained to the LPC in 1997 that the artwork had caused the wall it was mounted on to leak into the building, and that it had caused structural damage. The LPC finally allowed the removal of the artwork in 2002 under the condition that the owners put the art back up after work was completed.

In September 2004 the owners were sued by the city government to replace the wall. US District Court Judge Deborah Batts threw out the initial defense by the owners that the wall was an infringement of their First Amendment rights. In May 2005, however, Judge Batts ruled that the city was violating the owners' Fifth Amendment rights, and that the city could not force the owners to maintain the wall. However, if the city did decide to go through with an order to replace the wall, it would owe the owners fair compensation for the wall's construction.

In April 2007, the city and owners announced a deal whereby the exterior of the building would be increased by 30 feet, so that the artwork could be installed higher, allowing for street level advertising space. Without the artwork, the owners estimated that the wall could generate up to $600,000 in advertising revenue a year.
