= Warner Jepson =

American composer (1930–2011)

- Born: 24 March 1930; Sioux City, Iowa
- Died: 5 July 2011 (aged 81)
- Occupation: Composer

Warner Jepson (March 24, 1930 – July 5, 2011) was an American composer from Bethlehem, Pennsylvania. In 1952, he graduated from Oberlin Conservatory of Music with a degree in composition. He spent most of his remaining years in the San Francisco Bay Area. He was a pioneer in the electronic music scene. Early works from the late 1950s include collaborations with dancers Anna Halprin, Simone Forti, and visual artist Robert Morris (artist).

Jepson composed a variety of works including film and ballet scores. His sculpture and photography was featured at the San Francisco Museum of Art. He received an Emmy in 1974 for a piece done in connection with KQED.

== Film scores ==
- 1972 Gold
- 1971 Luminous Procuress
- 1968 The Bed
