= Daedalus (sculpture) =

Sculpture by Charles Ginnever

University of Michigan Museum of Art, September 2023

Daedalus is a public art work by artist Charles Ginnever, located at the University of Michigan Museum of Art (UMMA) in Ann Arbor, Michigan. It is installed on the lawn in next to the museum, at 525 South State Street.

== History ==
Ginnever created it in 1975, and UMMA purchased and installed it in 1977. Originally, it was in front of UMMA, but when the museum underwent a major renovation in 2008–2009, it was moved to the south lawn of the building, across the street from the University of Michigan Law School.

UMMA's director in the 1970s, Bret Waller, said of the decision to purchase the piece, "We spent over a year surveying the field and looking at sculpture before selecting this piece by Charles Ginnever . . . I felt it was the best piece available for our purposes and recommended it to our executive committee. Daedalus is historically the most significant piece in what appears to be the most important series Ginnever has ever done."

== Description ==
The abstract sculpture is made of Cor-Ten steel. UMMA describes Daedalus's shape as "five parallelograms bent along diagonal lines that lean into each other." The sculpture is about 10 feet tall and 30 feet long. The concave space underneath it is about 11 feet deep.

== Meaning ==
The sculpture is named for mythical figure Daedalus, the father of Icarus.

UMMA's website describes the sculpture as follows:

Daedalus's arched footprint and fan of flat planes evoke the shape of a wing in mid-flight. As in much of Ginnever's work from this period, the open arrangement of geometric forms encourages the viewer to move around the piece. As one circumnavigates it, the sculpture's formal simplicity at first becomes clear, then it appears to change shape.

== Reception ==
In 1977, the Michigan Alumnus noted, "The placement of the sculpture on the front lawn of the museum has drawn some criticism from those who feel it blocks the view of the distinguished campus landmark."

In September 1977, in an editorial titled "Why do I find that stupid sculpture so fascinating?" Chuck Anesi wrote in the Michigan Daily,

. . . let's face it - most 20th century sculpture really does belong in the scrapyard. But the steel in this Daedalus thing - worked by Charles Ginneyer, a New York artist who specializes in such stuff - really deserves to be on the lawn of the art museum instead of in an automobile bumper. Well, what's the attraction? It looks best from the museum steps, in long afternoon light, on a clear day, when its perpetually ascending lines can dissolve into the atmosphere. The atmosphere, of course, is part of the sculpture, too. The air and space it holds is enormous.These effects combine with the rust brown patina of the unprotected steel - brown, the color of old, venerable and historic things, giving the work a sort of timeless serenity.

In September 1977, Lionel Biron placed a large price tag reading "$500,000" on the side of the sculpture. The Michigan Daily reported,

"The price tag is a poetic metaphor," said Biron, "and should not be taken at face value alone." In a news release handed out on the spot Biron informed the public that the $500,000 price tag - a figure arrived at partially by adding labor and material costs - was not a criticism of the unusual sculpture. "What shocks most people in my assertion is not the relative aesthetic worth of the two works of art," Biron said, referring to Daedalus and the price tag, "but the genuine challenge it presents to economic assumptions upon which our society rests. In other words, if I were given 'a half million dollars for the price tag and the sculptor only received 10 per cent of this amount, this would seriously upset generally held beliefs as to what constitutes the apparently logical distribution of money in our society."

In December 1977, the Michigan Daily wrote of the piece,

UAC brought us Robert Altman who brought us "Three Women," George Lucas brought us "Star Wars" which brought us The Force, but most people still aren't sure who on earth brought us Daedalus. Nonetheless, like an old warrior, the twisting sculpture stands guard outside the art museum, immune to the raves and ridicule its form has inspired. Altman would probably like it because no one can figure it out. Lucas would probably sneer because it doesn't make money. But the one thing that's for sure is that no two people will ever agree on all three. Art just ain't that easy.
