= Moon Museum =

Ceramic artwork

- Artists: John Chamberlain, Forrest Myers, David Novros, Claes Oldenburg, Robert Rauschenberg and Andy Warhol
- Year: 1969
- Type: ceramic wafer
- Dimensions: 1.9 cm × 1.3 cm (0.75 in × 0.5 in)
- Location: Apollo 12 Lunar Module Intrepid, Mare Cognitum; 3.01239°S 23.42157°W

Moon Museum is a small ceramic wafer three-quarters by one-half inch (19 by 13 mm) in size, containing artworks by six prominent artists from the late 1960s. The artists with works in the "museum" are Robert Rauschenberg, David Novros, John Chamberlain, Claes Oldenburg, Forrest Myers and Andy Warhol.

This wafer was supposedly covertly attached to a leg of the Lunar Module Intrepid, and subsequently left on the Moon during Apollo 12. Moon Museum is considered the first Space Art object. While it is impossible to tell if Moon Museum is on the Moon without sending another mission to look, technicians have admitted to placing personal effects onto the Apollo landers, hidden in the layers of gold blankets that wrapped parts of the spacecraft which remained on the Moon after the astronauts departed.

== History ==
The concept for Moon Museum was brainstormed by sculptor Forrest "Frosty" Myers. He stated that "My idea was to get six great artists together and make a tiny little museum that would be on the moon." Myers attempted several times to get his project sanctioned by NASA. He claims the agency gave him the runaround and, Myers states, "They never said no, I just could not get them to say anything." Instead of going through the official channels, he was forced to take the back route and try to smuggle it on board.

Image of the Moon Museum from the original New York Times article. The thumb obscures Warhol's drawing.

Myers contacted Experiments in Art and Technology (E.A.T.), a non-profit group that was linking artists with engineers to create new works. Through E.A.T., Myers was introduced to some scientists from Bell Laboratories, specifically Fred Waldhauer. Using techniques normally used to produce telephone circuits, the scientists etched the drawings Myers had gathered onto small ceramic wafers. Either 16 or 20 of these wafers were created, with one going on the Apollo 12 lunar lander and the rest, copies of the original, handed out to the artists and others involved in the project.

When NASA dithered whether the wafer would be allowed onto the module, Waldhauer devised another plan. Waldhauer knew a Grumman Aircraft engineer who was working on the Apollo 12 lander module, and he proved willing to place the wafer on it. Myers asked Waldhauer how he would know if the art actually made it onto the lander, and was told that the Grumman engineer would send Myers a telegram when the wafer was in place. At 3:35 p.m. on November 12, 1969, less than two days before Apollo 12 took off, Myers received a telegram at his house from Cape Canaveral, Florida stating "YOUR ON' A.O.K. ALL SYSTEMS GO," and signed "JOHN F."

The existence of the work was not revealed until Myers informed The New York Times, which ran an article on the project on November 22, 1969, while Apollo 12 was in transit from the Moon back to Earth.

== Artworks ==
One of the copies of Moon Museum. Artwork placement: Warhol / Rauschenberg / Novros; Myers / Oldenburg / Chamberlain

There are six artworks located on the ceramic tile, each one in black and white. Starting from the top left are the initials of Andy Warhol consisting of the letters 'W' and inverted 'A' deliberately shaped to look like a penis. "He was being the terrible bad boy," said Forrest Myers in an interview. Next is a single line by Robert Rauschenberg. To its right is a black square with thin white lines intersecting, resembling a piece of circuitry, by David Novros. Below it is John Chamberlain's contribution, a template pattern which also resembles circuitry. In the lower middle is a geometric variation on Mickey Mouse, by Claes Oldenburg, a popular motif for the artist at that time. Forrest Myers created the work in the lower left, a computer-generated drawing.

Both John Chamberlain and Claes Oldenburg have confirmed through representatives that they contributed drawings to Moon Museum.

== See also ==
- Space art § Art in space
- Fallen Astronaut
- Museum of the Moon
