= Eberhard Bosslet =

German contemporary artist

- Born: 8 July 1953 (age 73); Speyer, West Germany (now Germany)
- Known for: Painting, Sculpture, Installation art, art intervention
- Movement: Contemporary artist

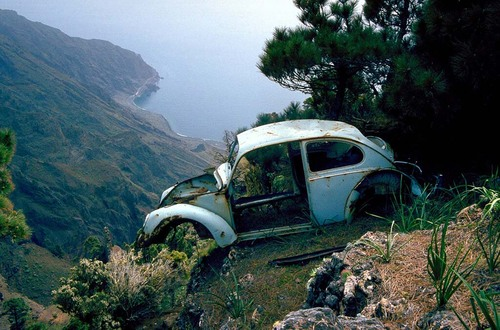
Eberhard Bosslet, Schrott & Sonne (Scrap Metal and Sun), 1982

Eberhard Bosslet (born 1953) is a German contemporary artist who has been producing site-specific art and architectural-related works, such as sculpture, installation, light art and painting, all indoors and outdoors, since 1979.

== Biography ==
Eberhard Bosslet was born in 1953 in Speyer, Germany, He has lived in Berlin and Dresden.

Bosslet co-founded the artist group, "Material & Effect" (Material & Wirkung) in Berlin in 1981, and since 1980, has been the co-director of the artist space "MOPEDS" in Berlin/Kreuzberg that is involved in curating and managing non-conventional art shows.

== List of works ==
- 1979: Self-referential works in words and writing-form of painting, photography, wall-drawings, and plates; site-specific interior work with wall-drawings and plates.
- Since 1979:
  - Sculptures and installations with electric light and electric steering;
  - Performance "Per-/Re-ception" (Wahr-nehmen) in a hall at an industrial yard in Speyer, Germany, using electric installation, electric light, zinc sulfide (phosphorus); photographic details of existing situations in the hall, projected in color or black-and-white negative slides, on the situations themselves.
- 1980: Wood panels, coated with colored varnish, and variably arranged in layers.
- Since 1980: Broken glass-panes, site-specific and installation works, as well as paintings with partially colored-coated broken glass, acrylic panes and flexible PVC sheets indoors and outdoors.
- 1981: Works with roadway markings and roadblocks.
- 1982: "Mobilien & Immobilien" (Movables & Immovables), a series of photographs, produced with a painted Vespa motor scooter, and colored house facades at Tenerife/Canary Islandes.
- 1982 – 84: "Mobiliar" (Furniture), and "Stand der Dinge" (Status Quo); photographs of interior designs in which the backgrounds and objects were painted.
- Since 1982:
  - Series of color photographs at the Canary Islands, Spain;
  - Urban exploration: so-called "scrap metal and sun"; Abandoned cars in southern landscape;
  - "Interventions" in public space, site specific art,
- 1983: Works of rubble at a waste dump.
- 1983–2011:
  - Works with ruins, so-called "Re/formations and side effects"; here, stabilization and destabilization of perception of conditions of industrial and residential buildings by white painted lines or black painted color fields;
  - Site-specific outdoor intervention.
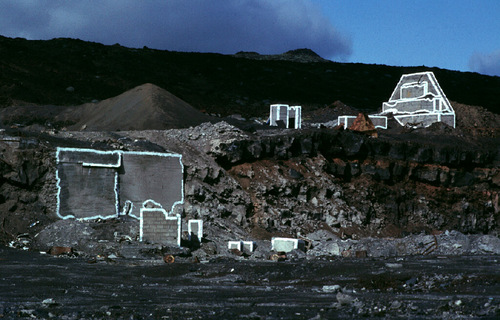
construction drawing – La Restinga II, El Hierro, 1983

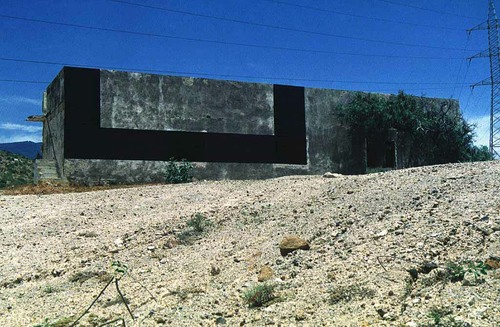
side effect VII, Guimar, Teneriffa, 1990

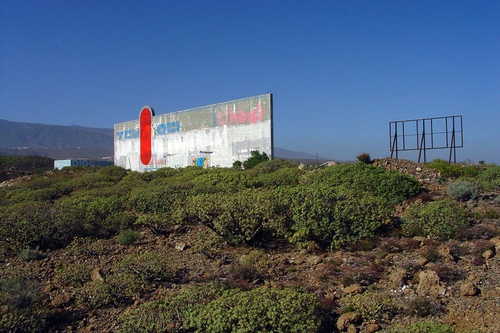
side effect X, Tajao, Teneriffa, Südseite, 2006

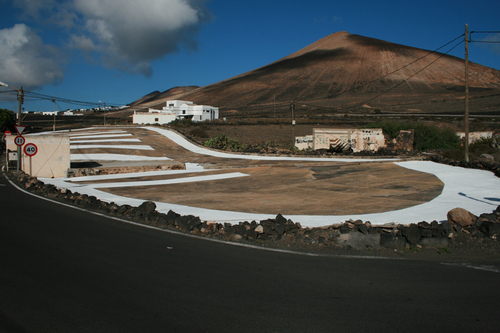
side effect X, Tias, Lanzarote, 2008
- 1985 – 88: Painting – each form complex has its own color and paint material; the "facade ground" is a significantly visible component, and is of equal value as the variables, "form, color, and paint material".
- Since 1985: "Supporting Measures" – indoor, space-related installations and sculptures with items of the building trade; here, new arrangement of space, apparent stabilization and destabilization of the building material and the space itself, by building in structural bodies.
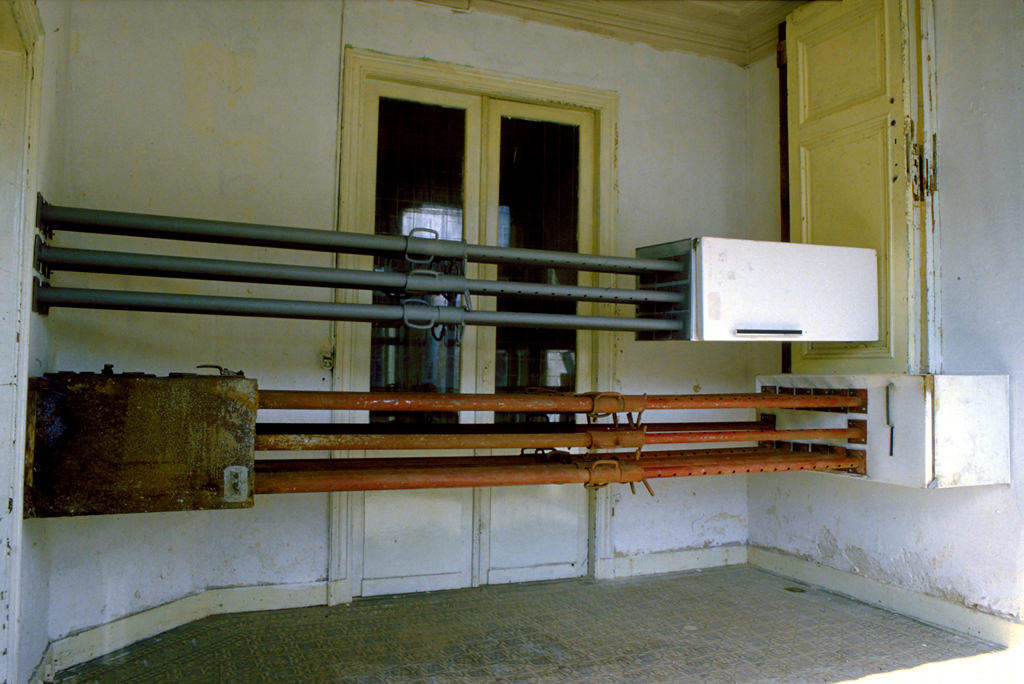
UM-ANT-Expander, Antwerpen 1985

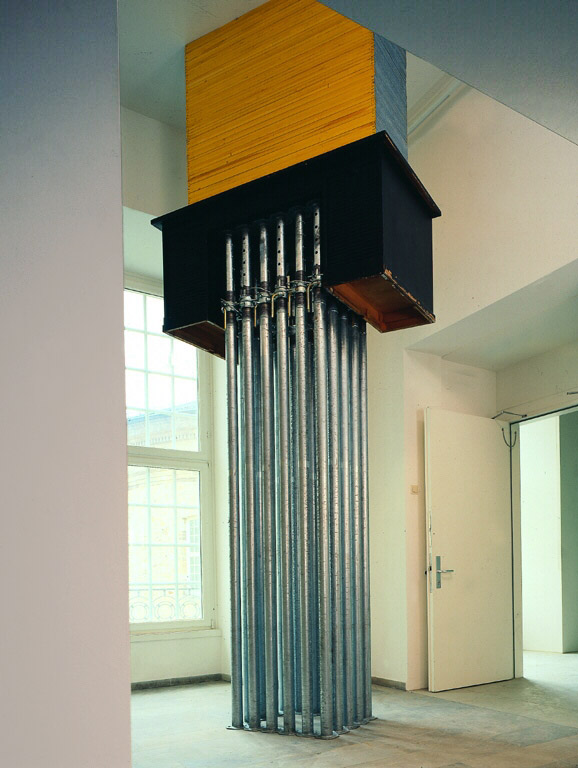
Anmaßend I, documenta 8, Kassel, 1987

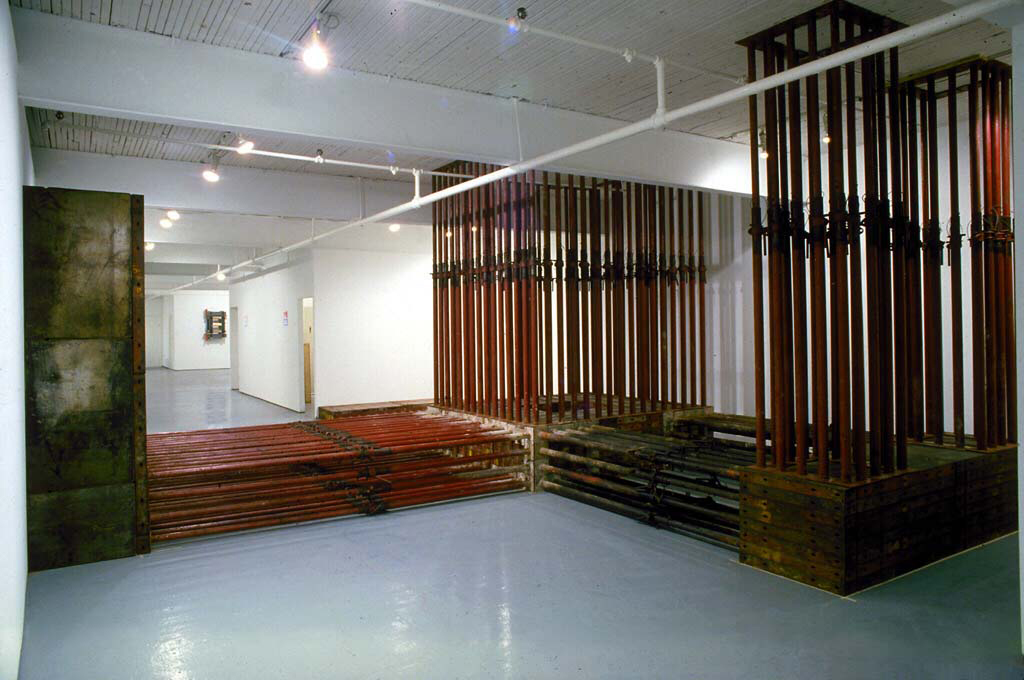
Supporting Measures at Mercer Union, Toronto, 1988

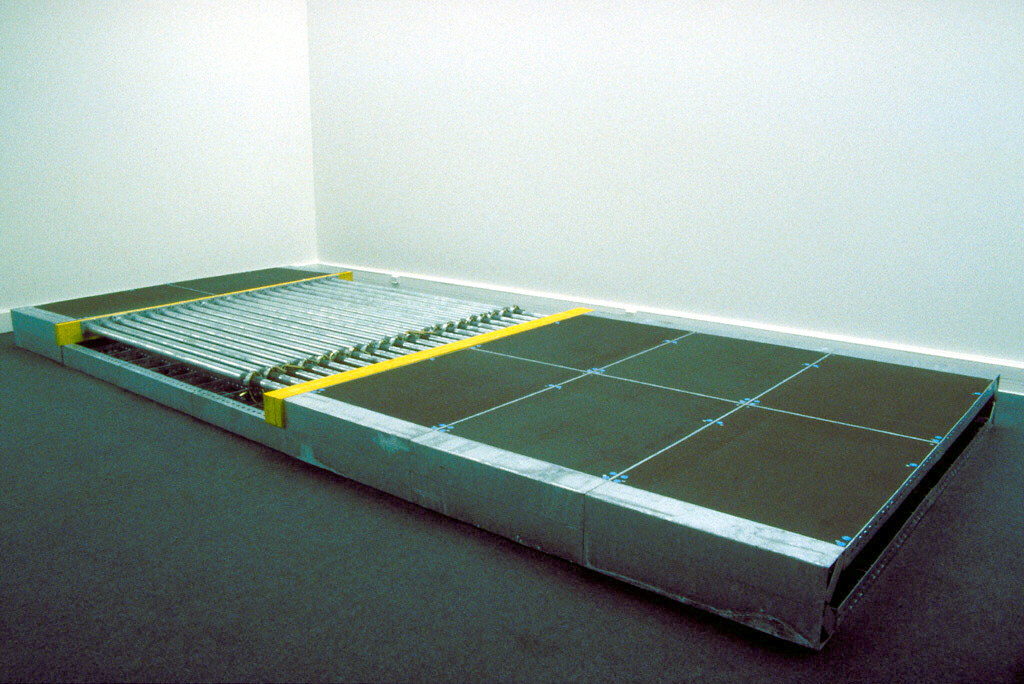
Modulare Struktur – flat, Prato, 1988

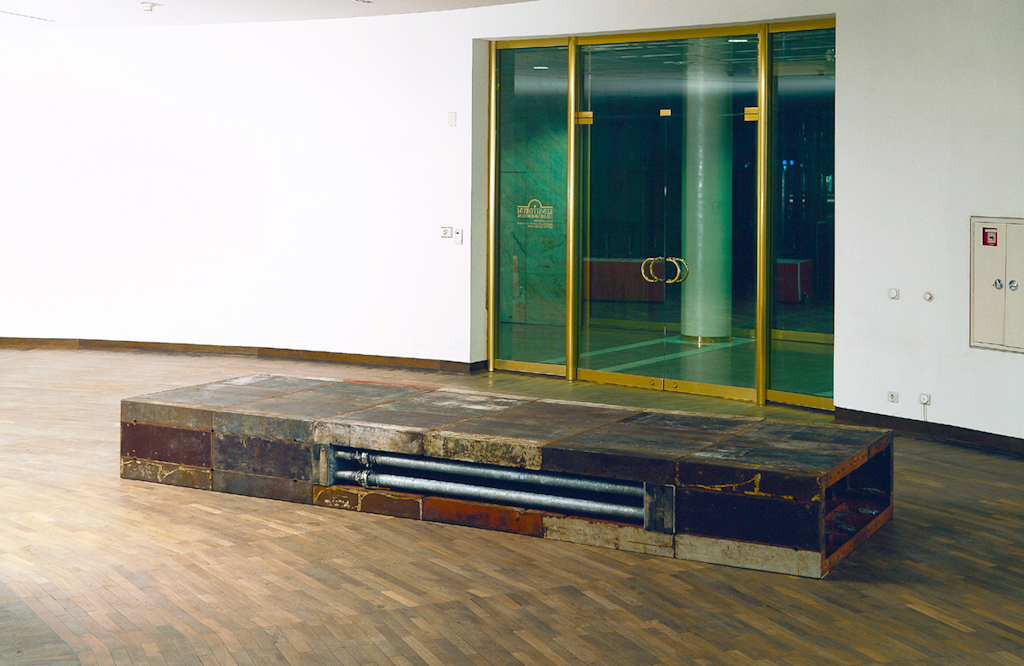
Modulare Struktur – Raster B3/89, Berlin, 1989

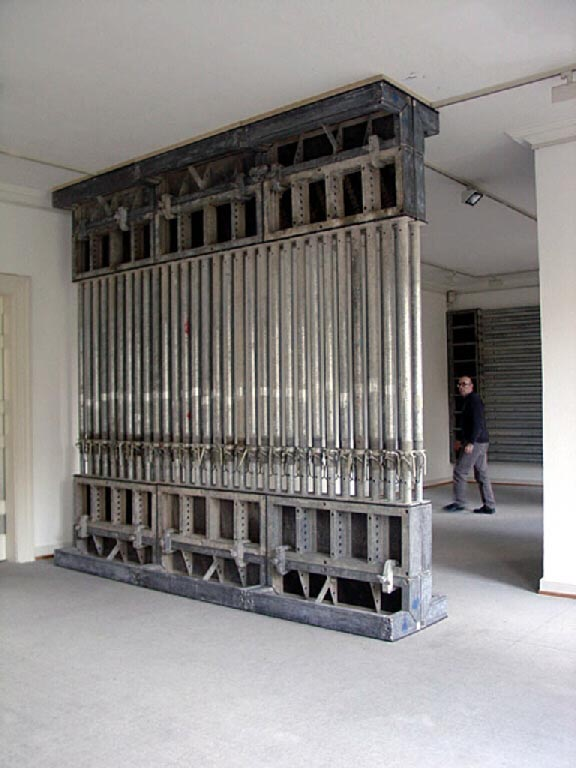
UM Bregenz 90/04, Thurn & Taxis Palais, 2004

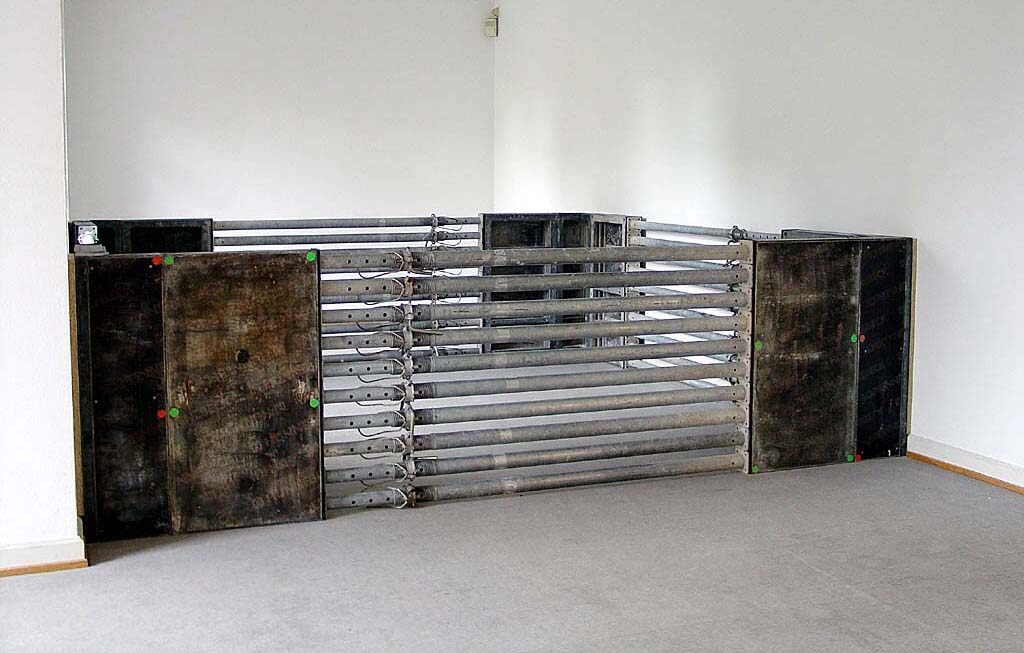
Stallung Bregenz 90/04, Thurn & Taxis Palais, 2004

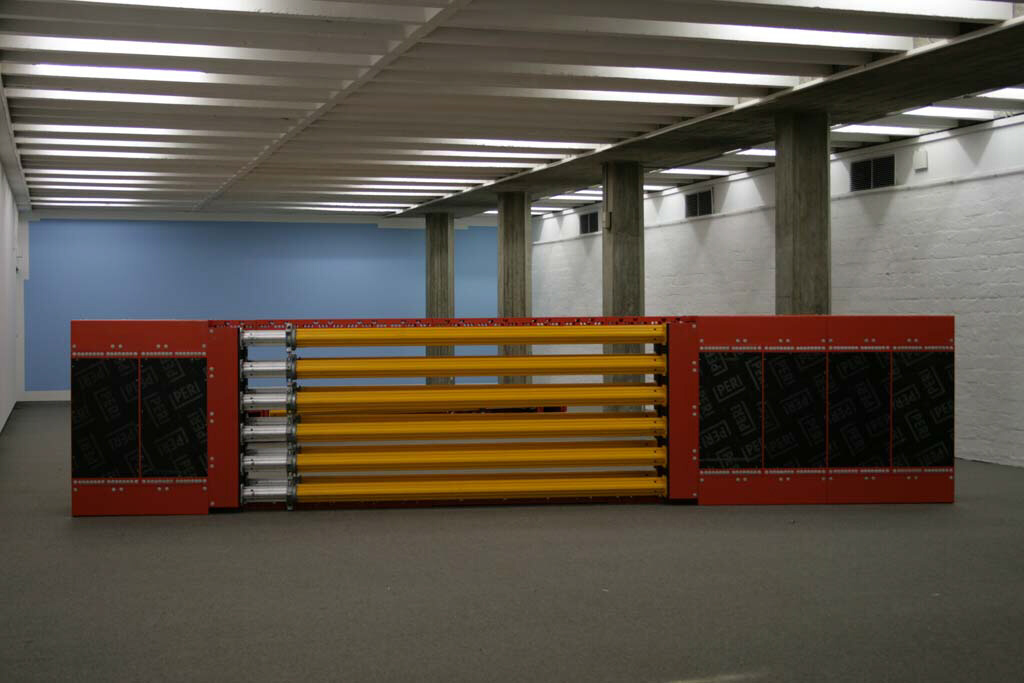
Modulare Struktur – Hochkant 90/09 KV-IN-PERI, Ingolstadt 2009

Subwaystation Auf dem Damm, Duisburg, 2000
- 1986: "Basements" – low, floorplan-like sculptures, with concrete blocks and copper pipe, or bricks and copper pipe.
- 1987 – 1989|89: Sculptures of "Filing Cabinets" with wood, steel strips; tension and pressure keeps the new order of components stable.
- Since 1989:
- "Tapestry" of industrial textiles, with no "ground" due to the color-form-material complexes, sewed up next to each other;
- Wall fixtures, varying in type and shape, have a supporting and visual function.
- Since 1989:
  - Project drawings for planned sculptures and installations, computer-generated using a pixel-oriented program, and printed with a 24-needle printer;
  - "Pneumatic Pieces" – Free-standing works, with hydraulically or pneumatically driven lifting devices for inside; "contraptions" made of items from industrial and domestic parts.
  - "Pneumatic Installations" – Installed works, with hydraulically or pneumatically driven lifting devices for both inside and outside; "contraptions" made of items from industrial and domestic parts.
- 1993 – 98:
  - "Bilaterale Beziehungen" (Bilateral Relations);
- "Screens": Lattice-structures of rubber- or polyurethane-mounted on both sides of a wall; anchor bars inserted into holes in the walls, helical pressure springs, and anchor nuts have a visual function and hold the parts together.
  - "Gloriolen": cast reliefs, mounted on both sides of a wall, using the same principle as in "Screens", the cast reliefs are held together through anchor bars, helical pressure springs, and anchor nuts that also have a visual function.
- Since 1995: "Barrieren" (Barriers) – foundation-like, knee-high constructions in concrete and steel reinforcement, made on site, designed for the dimensions of the space, and blocking the evident path through the room.
- 1998–2001: "Spacelab" – made out of living room lights from the 1950s–1970s, hanging from the ceiling.view]
- Since 2000:
  - "Analogic Discs"
  - Paintings: Trampolines are the support, which is a constructive and visual part of the appearance. The support, the form, the material and the color are different, and they are piled on each other.
- Since 2001
  - Biomorphic sculptures "Stool Archipelago", "Island growth", "stump stools" are groups of sculptures made of fibreglass plastic on the basis of known organic forms.
- Since 2003
  - Colour photo series entitled Falsches Wasser (Fake Water) featuring ships and boats on land in town or countryside settings on the Canary Islands, Spain.
- Since 2006
  - EinRaumHaus (OneRoomHouse) colour photo series of small buildings in the landscape of the Canary Islands, Spain.
  - Instant sculptures: The sculpture entitled "roundabout" for the public space, consisting of industrial units such as trolleys and fences, which contrary to its conventional use are connected to mega-structures.

== Exhibitions ==
=== One man shows ===
- Since 1981: "Interventions" in public space, Antwerp, Barcelona, Canary Islands, Duisburg (Belgium), Spain, Germany.
- 1985: "Interventiones", Fundación Miró, Barcelona; Espacio P, Madrid, Spain (catalog).
- 1986: Wilhelm-Lehmbruck-Museum, Duisburg, Germany (catalog).
- 1987: Heidelberger Kunstverein, Germany (catalog).
- 1988:
  - February: John Gibson Gallery, New York City, US.
  - Mercer Union, Toronto, Canada.
  - John Gibson Gallery, September, New York City, US.
- 1989:
  - Barbara Farber Gallery, Amsterdam, the Netherlands.
  - Neue Nationalgalerie Berlin, Germany (catalog).
  - Karl Bornstein Gallery, Santa Monica, California, US.
- 1990:
  - Galerie Le Gall-Peyroulet, Paris, France.
  - John Gibson Gallery, New York City, US.
- 1991:
  - Kunstraum Wuppertal, Germany.
  - Galerie Gilles Peyroulet, Paris, France.
- 1993:
  - Kunsthal Rotterdam, the Netherlands (catalog).
  - Sala 1, Rome, Italy (catalog).
  - Galerie Blancpain-Stepczynski, Geneva, Switzerland.
- 1995:
  - Interventionen II, VERBAU, Sprengel Museum Hannover, Germany (catalog).
  - PLANEN, Kunstverein Heilbronn, Germany (catalog).
- 1998: Fundamental wie Bilateral, Kunsthalle Mannheim, CD-ROM for PC, Germany.
- 2000:
  - Satellites, Galerie Bochynek, Düsseldorf, Germany.
  - Interventions, John Gibson Gallery, New York City, US.
- 2002: "Analog Discs", Galerie Bochynek, Düsseldorf, Germany.
- 2004:
  - Okkupanten, Künstlerhaus Bregenz, Palais Thurn und Taxis, Austria.
  - Interventionen und Tekko-Tische, Chiara Marzi Gallery, Berlin
- 2005: Galerie AT, Barriere, Poznan, Poland
- 2006: Galerie der Stadt Backnang (catalog), Germany
- 2007: Stadtgalerie Saarbrücken, (catalog), Germany
- 2009: Additive, Kunstverein Ingolstadt, CD-ROM-archive with booklet in softbox, Germany
- 2010: Humboldt-University Berlin, Thaer-Saal, Berlin, Germany
- 2011: Stump stools, Lichthof im Albertinum Dresden, Dresden, Germany
- 2012: Dingsda, Saarland Museum, Saarbrücken, Germany
- 2014: Chisme-Heavy Duty, TEA Tenerife Espacio de las Artes, Santa Cruz de Tenerife, Spain

== Group shows ==
- 1987:
  - Bremer Kunstpreis 1987, Kunsthalle Bremen, Germany, (catalog).
  - documenta, documenta 8, Kassel, Germany, (catalog).
- 1988:
  - European sculpture made in USA, John Gibson Gallery, New York City, US (catalog).
  - BRD abstract tendencies in new German art, Karl Bornstein Gallery, St. Monica, California, US.
  - Spaces 88, Museo d'arte contemporanea Prato, Italy (catalog).
  - New Poverty, MeyersBloom Gallery, Santa Monica, California, US.
- 1989: Intuition, John Gibson Gallery, New York City, US.
- 1990:
  - Three German Sculptors, Bosslet, Robbe, Staehle, Anthony Ralph Gallery, New York, US.
  - Trans-Europe-Express, John Gibson Gallery, New York City, US.
  - Non-Sculpture, Barbara Farber Gallery, Amsterdam, the Netherlands.
  - The Collection 1988–90, Museo d'arte contemporanea Prato, Italy (catalog).
- 1991: Eurocard, John Gibson Gallery, New York City, US.
- 1992:
  - 30th anniversary of Amnesty International, Hótel des arts, Paris, France (catalog).
  - Kunst werkt (Art works), Peter Stuyvesant Foundation, Stedelijk Museum Amsterdam, Foundación Miró, Barcelona, Palacio de la Lonja, Zaragoza, Spain (catalog).
  - The 1980s, John Gibson Gallery, New York City, US.
  - Humpty Dumty's Kaleidoscope: A new generation of German artists, Museum of Contemporary Art Sydney, Australia (catalog).
  - Avantgarde Reflex Ost-West, Potsdam, Germany.
- 1993:
  - Eberhard Bosslet & Lawrence Gipe, Kunstverein der Rheinlande und Westfalen, Düsseldorf, Germany (catalog).
  - John Gibson Gallery, New York City, US.
  - La Laiterie, Amnesty International, Strasbourg, France.
- 1994:
  - New Furniture for the Villa, Villa Merkel Esslingen, Germany.
  - Villa Massimo 1988–92, Kunstverein Hannover, Germany.
- 1997: The Pleasure of Reading, John Gibson Gallery, New York City.
- 1998: Material & Wirkung, Bosslet, Sattel, Klotz, Kunsthaus Dresden, Germany.
- 2003: Unexpected selections from the Margulies collection, The Art Museum, Miami, Florida, US (catalog).
- 2004:
  - WorldWatchers, Kunsthaus Dresden (catalog), Germany
  - Konstruktion I Statik, Rüdiger Lange -Loop – Raum für aktuelle Kunst, Berlin, Germany
- 2006:
  - Faszination Fußball, Pfalzgalerie Kaiserslautern, Catalog, Germany
  - Filzfabrik Speyer, Künstlerbund Speyer, Germany
  - Das Jahrhundert moderner Skulptur, Wilhelm-Lehmbruck-Museum, Duisburg, Germany
- 2007: 1plus aus Dresden, Schloss Waldthausen bei Mainz, Germany
- 2008:
  - Ostrale 08, Zentrum für zeitgenössische Kunst, Dresden, Germany
  - 2nd Bienal de Canarias, Arte, Arquitectura y Paisaje, La Regenta,

Las Palmas Gran Canaria, Canary Islands, Spain

  - "berufen", Hochschule für Bildende Künste Dresden, Germany
- 2009:
  - Ostrale 09, Ausstellung internationaler zeitgenössischer Künste, Dresden, Germany
  - 1st Biennale für Internationale Lichtkunst Ruhr, (Catalog), Curator Matthias Wagner K, Germany
- 2010: Liebhaberstücke, Kunstmuseum Mülheim, Germany,
- 2011:
  - Universum, Temporärer Kunstraum Harkort, Leipzig, Germany
  - Kunst in der Villa Körbling, Speyer End of the dream, MicaMoco, Berlin, Germany
- 2012:
  - Participar, El Matadero, Madrid, Spain
  - art claim impulse, Berlin, Germany
  - 2nd Ural Industrial Biennial of Contemporary Art, Ekaterinburg, Russia (catalog)

== Bibliography ==
- Camps Miro, Teresa und Picazo Gloria: Eberhard Bosslet Intervenciones/Interventionen, Catalog of the Fundación Miró, Barcelona 1985, Spain.
- Stecker, Raimund: documenta 8, Catalog, Germany
- Cameron, Dan: European Sculpture made in U.S.A., Catalog of the John Gibson Gallery, New York City, US 1988.
- Day, Peter: Spaces 88, Catalog of the Museo d'Arte Contemporanea Prato, Italy 1988.
- Rubinstein, Meyer Raphael: Eberhard Bosslet at John Gibson Gallery, in: Flash Art, Summer 1988, p. 136.
- Deckter, Joshua: Eberhard Bosslet at John Gibson Gallery, in: Arts Magazine, December 1988, p. 106.
- Weinstein, Matthew A.: Eberhard Bosslet, John Gibson Gallery, in: Artforum, December 1988, p. 121/122, US.
- Ottmann, Klaus: European Sculpture made in U.S.A., John Gibson Gallery, in: Flash Art, Summer 1988.
- Nieuwenhuyzen, Martijn van: Eberhard Bosslet, Barbara Farber Gallery Amsterdam, in: Flash Art, May/June 1989 p. 125.
- Schmitz, Britta: Eberhard Bosslet, catalog of the Neue Nationalgalerie Berlin, 1989, Germany.
- Kandel, Susan: L.A. in Review, Eberhard Bosslet, Karl Bornstein Gallery, in: Arts Magazine, March 1990, p. 126, US.
- Pagel, David: Eberhard Bosslet, Karl Bornstein Gallery, in: Artscribe, March/April 1990, p. 82.
- Mahoney, Robert: Eberhard Bosslet, John Gibson Gallery, in Arts Magazine, January 1991.
- Murphy, Bernice: in Humpty Dumpty's Kaleidoscope, A New Generation of German Artists, catalog of the Museum of Contemporary Art, Sydney 1992, p. 17,34,55,58/59. Australia
- Bochynek, Martin: Eberhard Bosslet, Catalog of the Kunsthal Rotterdam 1993, Netherlands.
- Bosslet-Archive (electronic resource), works, essays, reviews 1979–2003; Editor Kunsthalle Mannheim. 3rd Edition, Gallery Version. Dresden, 2003

== See also ==
- Site specific art
- Environmental sculpture
- Environmental art
- Installation art
- Land Art
- Art intervention
- Street Art
- Light art
- List of German painters
