= Phyllis Yampolsky =

American artist and activist (1932–2025)

- Born: August 23, 1932; Philadelphia, Pennsylvania
- Died: June 10, 2025 (aged 92); New York, New York
- Occupations: Artist, activist
- Spouse(s): Peter Forakis (divorced), Bernard Roth
- Children: 2

Phyllis Yampolsky (August 23, 1932 – June 10, 2025) was an American artist associated with the art scene of the Judson Memorial Church during the 1960s and an advocate for the pool restoration at McCarren Park in Brooklyn, New York.

== Biography ==
Born in Philadelphia, Yampolsky was the daughter of Russian-Jewish immigrants. She studied at the Philadelphia College of Art and later with Hans Hofmann. Yampolsky is most known for her works that deal with politics and gender. Her piece, The Hall of Issues, was created at the Judson Church in 1961, where anyone could contribute any form of art to the walls. For Bill Clinton's presidential inaugurals of 1993 and 1997, she reprised Hall of Issues with a 100-foot-long "Town Hall Wall" in the nation's capital. As of 2025, the installation was in the Smithsonian's National Archives. Yampolsky was also associated with Thomas Hoving in producing happening events in NYC parks during the mid-1960s as well as advocating for the restoration of the McCarren Park pool, which reopened in 2007.

Yampolsky was once married to Peter Forakis, with whom she had two children, Jozeph Forakis (designer) and Gia Forakis (theater artist). She later married and was survived by Bernard Roth.
