= Luna Moth Walk I =

1982-83 sculpture by Charles Ginnever

- The sculpture in 2018
- Artist: Charles Ginnever
- Medium: Cor-Ten steel sculpture
- Location: Stanford, California, United States
- 37.425159°N 122.167911°W

Luna Moth Walk I is a 1982–1983 Cor-Ten steel sculpture by Charles Ginnever, installed on the Stanford University campus in Stanford, California, United States. The sculpture is part of Ginnever's "Luna Moth Walk" series; other steel artworks in the series include Luna Moth Walk II (1985) and Luna Moth Walk III (1982). Luna Moth Walk I is also one of three sculptures by Ginnever installed on the Stanford University campus, as of 2003.

== See also ==
- 1983 in art
