= Steam Work for Bellingham-II =

Coordinates: 48.731496°N 122.485793°W

Steam Work for Bellingham-II — or Untitled (Steam Work for Bellingham)— is a piece of contemporary art designed by Robert Morris and installed on the grounds of Western Washington University, Bellingham in 1974 as part of their public sculpture collection. It uses steam to create a fountain-like effect, which rises through a bed of rocks inside a 20' x 20' area delineated by wooden beams.

The pipes leading from the university's cooling plant were unearthed by vandals in 1999 and engineers subsequently discovered they were badly corroded. It has since been repaired.
