= Robert Grosvenor (artist) =

American sculptor (1937–2025)

- Born: Robert Strawbridge Grosvenor; March 31, 1937; New York City, U.S.
- Died: September 3, 2025 (aged 88); East Patchogue, New York, U.S.
- Education: École des Beaux-Arts de Dijon, École nationale supérieure des arts décoratifs. University of Perugia
- Known for: Sculpture
- Movement: Minimalism
- Spouses: Verta Smart (m. 1960, divorced); Jacqueline Gardner (m. 1965)
- Children: 3

Robert Strawbridge Grosvenor (March 31, 1937 – September 3, 2025) was an American contemporary sculptor, installation artist and draftsman. He is known for his monumental room installations, which border between sculpture and architecture. Grosvenor is associated with minimalism.

== Early life and education ==
Grosvenor was born March 31, 1937, in Manhattan, New York City. He studied at the École des Beaux-Arts de Dijon in 1956; at the École nationale supérieure des arts décoratifs, Paris in 1957 and 1959; and at the University of Perugia in 1958. He was inspired by Lucio Fontana and Piero Manzoni who he had been warned against while studying. He returned to New York for military service in 1959 during which time he came into contact with Mark di Suvero who introduced him to other artists.

== Work and career ==
Grosvenor was one of the 10 artists that founded the cooperative Park Place Gallery in New York City, open from 1963 to 1967. The other founders of the gallery included Mark di Suvero, Dean Fleming, Forrest Myers, Peter Forakis, Leo Valledor, Tamara Melcher, Tony Magar, and Edwin Ruda. In Grosvenor's work, he employed a mixture of industrial materials such as car body parts, plexiglass, stone, brick, concrete, and plastic. His earlier works were large wooden structures, reminiscent of the work of Ronald Bladen, hung or cantilevered above the exhibition space and later moved on to work that viewers could walk through or under. One of his best known sculptures is Tapanga (1965), originally exhibited in the mid-1960's and later realized in a monumental version at the Storm King Art Center. His work has helped define minimalism and was included in the seminal group exhibitions, Primary Structures (Jewish Museum, 1966), and Minimal Art (Gemeentemuseum Den Haag, 1968). His choice to work with rugged materials and found objects following the 1960s distanced him from minimalism. Grosvenor seldom spoke of the meaning behind his work and rarely gave his works titles.

== Art market ==
Grosvenor was represented by Paula Cooper Gallery since 1968, when the gallery opened. Grosvenor briefly left the gallery in 2023. Karma Gallery and Galerie Max Hetzler also showed his work.

== Personal life ==
In 1960, Grosvenor married Verta Smart; they had a daughter and later divorced. In 1965, he married Jacqueline Gardner, with whom he had two children.

Grosvenor died from kidney cancer at his home in East Patchogue, New York, on September 3, 2025, at the age of 88.

== Recognition ==
- 2020 – Ezratti Family Prize for Sculpture award, ICA Miami, Miami, Florida
- 1972 – American Academy of Arts and Letters grant
- 1970, 1983 – Guggenheim Fellowship
- 1970 – National Endowment for the Arts grant

== Exhibitions ==
List of select exhibits by Grosvenor:

=== Solo exhibitions ===
- 2025, Robert Grosvenor, Fridericianum, Kassel, Germany
- 2019–2021, Robert Grosvenor, ICA Miami, Miami, Florida
- 1992, Kunsthalle Bern, Bern, Switzerland

=== Group exhibitions ===
- 2012, The Room of the Line, Museum Wiesbaden, Wiesbaden, Hesse, Germany
- 2010, Whitney Biennial, Whitney Museum of American Art, New York City, New York
- 2006, What is plastic? 100 years - 100 heads: the century of modern sculpture, Lehmbruck Museum, Duisburg, North Rhine-Westphalia, Germany
- 2003, It happened tomorrow, Biennale d'art contemporain de Lyon, Lyon, France
- 1999, Forum: Robert Grosvenor, Andreas Gursky, John Wesley, Carnegie Museum of Art, Pittsburgh, Pennsylvania
- 1995, American Sculptors in the 1960s: Selected Drawings from the Collection, Museum of Modern Art, New York City, New York
- 1987, documenta 8, Kassel, Hesse, Germany
- 1987, L'Epoque, La Mode, La Morale, La Passion: Aspects de l'art d'aujourd'hui 1977-1987, Musée National d'Art Moderne, Center Georges Pompidou, Paris, France
- 1977, documenta 6, Kassel, Hesse, Germany
- 1976, 200 Years of American Sculpture, Whitney Museum of American Art, New York City, New York
- 1971, Sonsbeek 71, Sonsbeek Park, Arnhem, The Netherlands
- 1970, Preliminary Drawings, Museum of Modern Art, New York City, New York
- 1968, Minimal Art, Gemeentemuseum Den Haag (now Kunstmuseum Den Haag), The Hague, The Netherlands
- 1967, Park Place Gallery, Washington, D.C.
- 1966, Primary Structures, Jewish Museum, New York City, New York
