= Leo Valledor =

American painter (1936–1989)

- Born: 1936; Fillmore District, San Francisco, California, US
- Died: 1989 (aged 52–53); San Francisco, California, US
- Education: San Francisco Art Institute
- Years active: 1953–1989
- Style: hard-edge painting, minimalism

Leo Valledor (1936 – 1989) was a Filipino-American painter who pioneered the hard-edge painting style. During the 1960s he was a member of the Park Place Gallery in SoHo, New York City, which exhibited many influential and significant artists of the period. He was a leader of the minimalist movement in the 1970s.

== Early life and education ==
Valledor was born in 1936, in Fillmore district, San Francisco. His close friend, who he often referred to as "cousin," was San Francisco artist Carlos Villa.

From 1953 until 1955, Valledor was a student at the California School of Fine Arts (known currently as San Francisco Art Institute) under auspices of a scholarship. However, as art historian Paul J. Karlstrom wrote, "Despite a year as a scholarship student at CSFA, Valledor was largely self-taught, but he was gifted and quickly developed a gestural abstract style reflecting the influence of Mark Tobey. In addition to Tobey, his earliest influences were Paul Klee, Arshile Gorky, and Bradley Walker Tomlin."

== Career ==
In 1955, he had his first solo show "Compositions" at the historical Six Gallery. He showed his "Black and Blue Series."

When he moved to New York City in 1961 he became a member of the influential Park Place Gallery in SoHo, Manhattan, further delving into his avant garde interests of minimalism and conceptualism. It was considered the first gallery in SoHo, and included artists like Edwin Ruda, Mark di Suvero, Peter Forakis, and Forrest Myers.

In New York at the Kaymar Gallery in March and April 1964 Valledor also exhibited with Sol LeWitt and Donald Judd. He also had a solo show at the Graham Gallery on Madison Avenue in New York City. In 1968, Valledor left New York returning to San Francisco. He exhibited there at such establishments as the San Francisco Museum of Modern Art, and the San Francisco Art Institute. He was at the vanguard of the minimalist painting movement in the mid 1970s, and later in the seventies he exhibited at the San Francisco Museum of Modern Art, Daniel Weinberg Gallery, M. H. de Young Memorial Museum, and the Los Angeles Museum of Contemporary Art.

In the late 1970s and early 1980s, Valledor became the Art Exhibition Director and teacher at Lone Mountain College in San Francisco. He was a guest teacher at the University of California, Berkeley. He created a roof mural for the Department of Public Works approved by the San Francisco Arts Commission. He received his first National Endowment for the Arts Artist Fellowship Grant in 1981, and received another grant in 1982. In the eighties he received a California Arts Council artist-in-residence grant in the South of Market community. He also taught at the San Francisco Art Institute. He lived in San Francisco until his death in 1989, aged 52 or 53.

== Legacy ==
Art critics have placed his work in context with the work of Ellsworth Kelly, Barnett Newman, and Leon Polk Smith. Other art historians, like Frances Colpitt, have found his work to be in relation to Frank Stella. Colpitt states, "Less assimilable to Op art experiments of the early 1960s, Valledor's shaped canvases are more reminiscent of Frank Stella's contemporaneous work... But Skeedo (1965) is so quirky and radically shaped that it seems without precedent..." Art critic Knute Stiles reviewed Valledor's shows in San Francisco in the 1976: "He is one of a dozen modernists who subscribe to one or another of the subgroups of what might be called International Style Geometric abstraction. His work has a classical or pure form-oriented bent, but in the early '60s he emerged as a pioneer of the Minimalism which was to dominate that decade." Valledor's work explores the juxtapositions of colors and geometric forms as metaphors for the interplay of elements in the natural world, as Lawrence Rinder explains:

We all know that at one time (especially in San Francisco) jazz, abstract expressionism and what's known as Beat poetry were all part of one culture. It may be a cliche but it was a powerful reality. One thing helped to explain the other: one thought, different languages. I can imagine how great Leo must have felt to show his art at the Six Gallery in 1955... the same year Ginsberg first read his culture-shaking poem Howl. Where Leo's art gets hard for some is right where it ought to get easy. Abandoning the gestural language of abstract expressionism (which would linger in the Bay Area for decades), he started to explore reduced palettes, geometric shapes, and the spatial dimension of color. This wasn't the end of his dive into the jazz-like spirit, it was the beginning. Geometry was his style and color was his tone.

Valledor's work is in the collections of the Whitney Museum of American Art, the Achenbach Collection of San Francisco, M.H. de Young Memorial Museum, Oakland Museum of California, Seattle Art Museum, Philadelphia Museum of Art, Crocker Art Museum, National Gallery of Art, Yale University Art Gallery, St. Louis Art Museum, Philadelphia Museum of Art, Allentown Art Museum. and San Francisco Museum of Modern Art
