= Meg Webster =

American artist

Meg Webster (born 1944) is an American artist from San Francisco working primarily in sculpture and installation art. While her works span multiple media, she is most well known for her artworks that feature natural elements. She is closely affiliated with Post-Minimalism and the Land Art movement and has been exhibiting her work since 1980.

Her work is featured in many permanent collections throughout the world, including The Panza Collection at the Solomon R. Guggenheim Museum and the Walker Art Center. She has also created public, site-specific works for the Hudson River Park, Stanford University and other sites around the world.

== Early life and education ==
Meg Webster was born in San Francisco in 1944. She received her Bachelor of Fine Arts from Old Dominion University in Norfolk, Virginia. After shifting her focus from painting to sculpture, Webster pursued a Master of Arts degree at Yale University, completed in the early 1980s. While attending Yale, Webster was taught by important contemporary artists, such as Vito Acconci, Donald Judd, and Richard Serra. Webster has lived in the East Village in New York City since 1979, where she continues to produce sculptural works.

== Work ==
Meg Webster began exhibiting her work in 1980, showing her work in venues throughout the country. She draws inspiration from artists working in the vein of Land Art, such as Robert Smithson and Michael Heizer, her former mentor. Webster started working as Heizer's assistant in 1983, facilitating the installation of his exhibitions, including his 1985 solo show at the Whitney Museum. Meg Webster's most notable works are sculptures of natural materials, molded to create simple forms. Webster builds these works methodically and delicately, paying close attention to the structure and the weight of each work's physical presence.

Webster often employs industrial materials in her work juxtaposed with natural elements to create a visually complex space that provokes further thought on the intersection of nature and technology. Her artworks also often raise issues of global warming and the consequences of human interference with the environment. Although she is most recognized for her work in sculpture and installation, Webster also creates paintings and works on paper, both of which have been exhibited at Paula Cooper Gallery, her New York gallery representative. Webster continues to be featured in both group and solo shows in museums and galleries, in addition to her outdoor public commissions and garden designs.

She also did some notable works with Kurt Baptista an abstract artist in art show germany munich 2003

=== Installation art ===
Meg Webster's immersive installations allow the viewer to fully experience her manufactured atmospheres and to inhibit her creative vision. In Pool, originally built in 1998 and later recreated in 2013, Webster inserted a pool into the exhibition space at MoMA PS1. Although the pool is entirely artificial, Webster decided not to hide the manmade mechanics that made the pool possible. The infusion of natural elements in an industrial space envelops the viewer and transports them into an entirely new venue where these two worlds coexist. The 2013 installation was a part of the exhibition Expo 1, which served as an artistic commentary on the role of environment in society, a question that Meg Webster often grapples with in her sculptures and installations.

Exhibited both in and out of doors, many of her works are site specific and are built in accordance with their physical surroundings. Webster directly engages with her environment and invites viewers to do the same. In her most recent solo show at Paula Cooper Gallery in New York, Webster created an installation work, Solar Grow Room, in which she built an indoor garden complete with reflective paneling and industrial lamps.

=== Sculpture ===
Maintaining her preference for large scale works, Webster's sculptures are as dramatic and monumental as her installations. Although her sculptures generally pertain to environmental themes and incorporate natural materials, her pieces are sometimes composed of controlled geometric forms. Webster often turns to a certain roster of forms – cones, gates, hollows, beds, and rings – when creating her sculptures. Stick Spiral, created for the Panza Collection and later bequeathed to the Guggenheim Museum, consists of a simple spiral shape created solely from branches. The clean geometry is interrupted by the chaotic arrangement of branches, yet the piece remains contemplative rather than aggressive. Untitled (also known as Lifted Conical Depression) (1990), part of the Western Washington University Public Sculpture Collection, consists of a low-lying copper planter with Cloudberry slowly descending in a conical shape back into the earth, combining minimalist vocabulary with an ecological concern.

In 2008, Meg Webster exhibited a selection of her smaller sculptures at Paula Cooper Gallery in New York City. One of the most remarkable pieces was “Melted Weapon Box,” a seemingly unassuming small metal box atop a white column. Next to the open box was a photograph of a life-size M-4 assault rifle, the original material for the box. Webster melted the weapon down to create the small cube; the presentation of the box itself does not seem an atypical choice for her, but the relation to a vehicle of violence is unique to her body of work.

=== Other media ===
In addition to her work in installation and sculpture, Webster creates and exhibits what can be considered “paintings,” which consist of unconventional materials applied to paper. She chooses materials that are both industrial and natural, including cement, pollen and egg yolk. This combination of natural and manmade remains intrinsic to her work across each of her chosen media.

Webster has also experimented with video art in her various gallery shows. On multiple occasions, Webster has exhibited video projections of bears in their natural habitat, implying the consequences of malignant human intervention in the environment. Through these videos, Webster places environmental protection into dialogue with the commercial gallery space, asking the viewer to empathize with nature in an unexpected setting.

== Exhibitions ==
=== Solo exhibitions ===
- 2020
  - Ann Mosseri-Marlio Galerie, Basel, Switzerland
- 2017
  - Volume for Lying Flat, Meg Webster, Hiram Butler Gallery, Houston, Texas
- 2016
  - Meg Webster, Paula Cooper Gallery, New York, New York
- 2013
  - Meg Webster, Anne Mosseri-Marlio Galerie, Basel, Switzerland
  - Meg Webster: Pool, Expo 1: New York at MoMA PS1, Long Island City, New York
  - Meg Webster, Paula Cooper Gallery, New York, New York
- 2010
  - New Drawings, Devin Borden Hiram Butler Gallery, Houston, Texas
  - Drawings, Paula Cooper Gallery, New York, New York
  - Hudson River Park, New York, New York
- 2009
  - Meg Webster, Drawing and Objects Arkansas Arts Center, Little Rock, Arkansas
- 2008
  - Meg Webster, Paula Cooper Gallery, New York, New York
- 2000
  - New Work, Paula Cooper Gallery, New York, New York
- 1998
  - Pool, P.S. 1 Contemporary Arts Center, Long Island City, New York
  - Photographs, Thomas Healy Gallery, New York, New York
- 1997
  - Blue Sky, Morris-Healy Gallery, New York, New York
- 1996
  - Drawings, Hiram Butler Gallery, Houston, Texas
  - Drawings, Morris-Healy Gallery, New York, New York
- 1993
  - Recent Sculptures, Grand Salon, New York, New York
- 1992
  - Kitchen Garden, Contemporary Arts Museum, Houston, Texas
  - Running, Brooklyn Museum, Brooklyn, New York; Weatherspoon Arts Gallery, University of North Carolina, Greensboro, North Carolina
- 1991
  - Stream, Carnegie Museum of Art, Pittsburgh, Pennsylvania
- 1990
  - Milwaukee Art Museum, Milwaukee, Wisconsin
  - Barbara Gladstone Gallery, New York, New York
  - Meg Webster, Stuart Regen, Los Angeles, California
  - Drawing/Object, Scott Hanson Gallery, New York, New York
- 1988
  - Barbara Gladstone Gallery, New York, New York
- 1987
  - Meg Webster: Part II - Additions, Subtractions, Reformations, Forecast Gallery, Peekskill, New York, New York
- 1986
  - Excerpts from Circuit, Art Galaxy, New York, New York
  - Meg Webster, Forecast Gallery, Peekskill, New York
- 1983
  - Two Walls, Donald Judd's Exhibition Space, New York, New York
- 1980
  - Leavenworth Street, San Francisco, California

=== Group exhibitions ===
- 2025
  - Series of 5 monumental sculptures, including Mound (1998) and Mother Mound (1990), Bourse de Commerce, Pinault Collection, Paris, France (10/08/2025 - 01/19/2026)
  - Monumental sculpture in dried flowers by Meg Webster.
- 2020
  - Sculpture Milwaukee (June - October, 2020) Figures on the Ground: Perspectives on Minimal Art, CAB Foundation, Brussels, Belgium (4/1/6/20/20)
- 2019
  - Non-Vicious Circle, Paula Cooper Gallery, New York, NY
  - Occupy Colby: Artists Need to Create On The Same Scale That Society Has The Capacity To Destroy, Year 2, Colby College, Waterville, Maine (7/20 - 12/31/19)
- 2018
  - Indicators: Artists On Climate Change, Storm King Art Center, New Windsor, NY (5/19 - 11/11/18)
- 2017
  - Artists Need to Create at the Same Scale that Society has the Capacity to Destroy, curated by Phong Bui, Mana Contemporary, Jersey City, NJ (10/15—12/15/17)
- 2016
  - Landmark, Socrates Sculpture Park, Long Island City, New York
- 2015
  - Natura Naturans Roxy Paine e Meg Webster, Villa e Collezione Panza, Varese, Italy
- 2014
  - Art of Its Own Making, Pulitzer Arts Foundation, St. Louis, MO
- 2013
  - Dojima River Biennale, Osaka, Japan
- 2010
  - A Shot in the Dark, Walker Art Center, Minneapolis, Minnesota
- 2009
  - Commentary, Paula Cooper Gallery, New York, New York
- 2005
  - Down the Garden Path: The Artist’s Garden After Modernism, Queens Museum of Art, Queens, New York
- 2000
  - Systems Order Nature, Devin Borden Hiram Butler Gallery, Houston, Texas
  - Drawings & Photographs, Matthew Marks Gallery, New York, NY
- 1999
  - Hiriya Project Proposals Exhibition, Tel Aviv Museum of Art, Israel
- 1997
  - Around, Barbara Kraków Gallery, Boston, Massachusetts
- 1996
  - On / In / Through, Morris-Healy Gallery, New York, New York
- 1995
  - The Material Imagination, Solomon R. Guggenheim Museum, New York, New York
- 1994
  - Urban Paradise: Gardens in the City, Public Art Fund, PaineWebber Gallery, New York, New York
- 1993
  - Dialogues with Nature, The Phillips Collection, Washington, D.C.
- 1992
  - Theoretically Yours, Chiesa di San Lorenzo, Acosta, Italy
- 1990
  - The Last Decade: American Artists of the 1980’s, Tony Shafrazi Gallery, New York
  - Liz Larner, Rosemarie Trockel, Meg Webster, Stuart Regen Gallery, Los Angeles, California
  - Botanica: The Secret Life of Plants, Lehman College Art Gallery, Bronx, New York
- 1989
  - 1989 Biennial Exhibition, Whitney Museum of American Art, New York, New York
  - The Experience of Landscape: Three Decades of Sculpture, Whitney Museum of American Art, Downtown at Federal Reserve Plaza, New York, New York
  - Clegg & Guttmann, Andreas Gursky, Meg Webster, 303 Gallery, New York, New York
  - Pre-Pop Post-Appropriation, Stux Gallery, New York, New York
- 1988
  - Aperto 88, Venice Biennale, Venice, Italy
  - Sculpture Inside Outside, Walker Art Center, Minneapolis, Minnesota; Museum of Fine Arts, Houston, Texas
  - Art at the End of the Social, Rooseum, Malmö, Sweden
  - Utopia Post Utopia, Institute of Contemporary Art, Boston, Massachusetts
  - A Deer Manger, A Dress Pattern, Farthest Sea Water, and a Signature, 303 Gallery, New York, New York
  - Media Post Media, Scott Hanson Gallery, New York, New York
- 1987
  - Changing Group Exhibition, Paula Cooper Gallery, New York, New York
  - The New Poverty, John Gibson Gallery, New York, New York
  - Kindred Spirits, Hillwood Art Gallery, Long Island University, C.W. Post Campus, Brookville, New York, New York
- 1986
  - Robert Gober, Nancy Shaver, Alan Turner, Meg Webster, Cable Gallery, New York, New York
  - Sculpture in Place, Borough of Manhattan Community College, The City University of New York, New York
- 1984
  - Tom Bills/Hank de Ricco/Meg Webster: Outdoor Installations, Nassau County Museum of Fine Art, Roslyn Harbor, New York
- 1980
  - From the Land: An Exhibition of Earth-Related Works by Northeastern Artists, Brattleboro Museum and Art Center, Brattleboro, Vermont

=== Site-specific commissions ===
- 2020
  - Frieze New York (5/7 – 5/10/20) Stage design for Yeezy Season 8 at Espace Niemeyer for Paris Fashion Week
- 2019
  - Stage design for Mary, a Kanye West opera, presented at David Geffen Hall at Lincoln Center, New York (12/22/19)
  - Environmental installation in collaboration with Kanye West, “Jesus is King” album and film Premiere, The Forum, Los Angeles (10/23/19)
