= Rain Forest (1959) =

Fountain/sculpture by James FitzGerald

- Artist: James FitzGerald
- Year: 1959
- Type: Fountain
- Medium: Bronze
- Subject: Olympic Peninsula temperate rain forest
- Location: Bellingham, WA; 48°43′54″N 122°29′17″W
- Owner: Western Washington University
- Accession: 1960

Rain Forest is a bronze fountain/sculpture by James FitzGerald located on the campus of Western Washington University. Commissioned in 1959 and unveiled in 1960, it was the first work in the Western Washington University Public Sculpture Collection. The sculpture represents the temperate rainforests of the nearby Olympic Peninsula.
