= Robert Maki =

American cancer researcher

Robert Maki, MD PhD FACP
- Born: Omaha, Nebraska
- Education: Northwestern University, Cornell University Medical College
- Known for: Sarcoma of bone and soft tissue, GIST, leiomyosarcoma, angiosarcoma, desmoid tumor, cancer clinical trials
- Medical career
- Profession: Oncologist
- Institutions: Dana–Farber Cancer Institute; Memorial Sloan-Kettering Cancer Center; Mount Sinai Hospital; Northwell Cancer Institute; Cold Spring Harbor Laboratory; Hospital of the University of Pennsylvania
- Sub-specialties: Sarcoma oncology, developmental therapeutics, translational research
- Research: Cancer

Robert Maki is an American medical oncologist, Professor of Medicine at the Hospital of the University of Pennsylvania, He is a specialist in the management of and translational research regarding sarcoma, the group of connective tissue malignancies that include leiomyosarcoma, gastrointestinal stromal tumor (GIST), liposarcoma, angiosarcoma, Ewing sarcoma, desmoid tumor and many others.

He was previously the Chief Scientific Officer of the Northwell Cancer Institute, New Hyde Park, NY, where he coordinated translational research between Northwell Cancer Institute and Cold Spring Harbor Laboratory.

== Education ==
Maki earned a B.A. in the Integrated Science Program from Northwestern University in 1985, his Ph.D. from Cornell University Graduate School of Medical Sciences in 1991, and his M.D. from Cornell University Medical College in 1992. He completed an internship and a residency at Brigham and Women's Hospital in Boston, MA and a clinical fellowship at the Dana–Farber Cancer Institute.

== Research ==
Maki has been involved in medical research for over 30 years, first working at Northwestern University under T. T. Wu on immunoglobulin structure and genetics. He then worked with David Donner before working under Pramod Srivastava and Lloyd Old for his PhD at Cornell University Medical College and Memorial Sloan-Kettering Cancer Center (MSKCC). After finishing his MD, he worked with Kenneth Rock on antigen presentation then with Abul Abbas on CD4 T cells in the anticancer immune response before turning his attention to clinical sarcoma studies during his residency and fellowship. He worked with George Demetri at Dana–Farber Cancer Institute on early clinical trials with trabectedin and imatinib, showing their activity in cancer patients.

In 1999, Maki returned to New York, where he developed the sarcoma medical oncology program at MSKCC over 12 years, and served as principal investigator in a number of phase I-II-III trials of anti-neoplastic agents and worked in translational projects in GIST, angiosarcoma, desmoid tumor and other diagnoses. In 2011 he moved to Mt Sinai in New York as chief of pediatric hematology-oncology, where he remained until 2016 before assuming leadership of the Phase I cancer clinical trials group and sarcoma program at the Northwell Cancer Institute. He is affiliated with and professor at both Donald and Barbara Zucker School of Medicine at Hofstra/Northwell and Cold Spring Harbor Laboratory.

Apart from clinical trials in sarcomas, perhaps the most recognized of which is a phase III of gemcitabine and docetaxel in soft tissue sarcoma patients conducted by SARC, the Sarcoma Alliance for Research through Collaboration, he has helped identify heat shock proteins such as the endoplasmic reticulum hsp90 family member gp96 as a cancer vaccine, participated in the identification of a new form of Ewing-like sarcoma with distinct translocation and behavior, and has examined the role of stem cells in the determination of sarcoma lineage. In 2018 he described with colleagues a clinical tool, the weighted toxicity score (WTS), which allows the use of a summary metric for toxicity to adjust doses during conduct of a randomized cancer clinical trial.

Maki is the author of more than 200 articles, over 150 of which have been peer reviewed. He has co-authored a definitive book describing systemic therapy for each of the more than 50 types of soft tissue sarcoma. He is currently an associate editor of the Journal of Clinical Oncology and Clinical Cancer Research. In 2019, he completed his term as chair of the medical oncology examination committee of the American Board of Internal Medicine. He continues to participate in the training of oncologists in his regular work and in workshops, such as the annual Methods in Clinical Cancer Research program sponsored by ECCO, ESMO, EORTC and AACR in Zeist, Netherlands.

Maki is a fellow of the American College of Physicians (FACP), and a member of the American Society of Clinical Oncology.

== Honors and awards ==
- 1997 Fellow, Howard Hughes Medical Institute
- 2007 Byrne Fund Award, Memorial Sloan-Kettering Cancer Center
- 2015 FACP: Fellow, American College of Physicians
