= David Novros =

American artist (born 1941)

- Born: August 8, 1941 (age 84); Los Angeles, California, U.S.
- Education: Chouinard Art Institute
- Alma mater: University of Southern California
- Movement: Minimalism
- Spouse: Joanna Pousette-Dart
- Father: Lester Novros

David Ross Novros (born 1941), is an American artist. He is known for his minimalist geometric paintings, shaped canvases, and his use of color. He has also studied fresco painting extensively.

== Early life and education ==
"Frescoes in the Courtyard" (1984) by Novros, located at the David W. Dyer Federal Building and United States Courthouse in Miami, Florida

David Novros was born on August 8, 1941, in Los Angeles, California, to parents Esther (née Susswein) and Lester Novros. His mother was from Poland. While he was a teenager he took classes at Chouinard Art Institute. He studied film at the University of Southern California (USC) and graduated in 1963. While attending USC, sculptor Melvin Edwards was two years below him in the same department.

== Career ==
In 1965, Novros moved to New York City. After moving he became active within the Park Place Gallery. In 1969, Novros along with five other artists including Andy Warhol, Robert Rauschenberg, Claes Oldenburg, John Chamberlain, and Forrest Myers, participated in the creation of the project called the Moon Museum (or Museum of the Moon) to send the first artwork to the moon.

His work is within various public museum collections including at the National Gallery of Art, Museum of Modern Art, Minneapolis Institute of Art, the Nelson-Atkins Museum of Art, Metropolitan Museum of Art, Smithsonian American Art Museum, Museum of Fine Arts, Houston, Yale University Art Gallery, National Gallery of Australia, Art Institute of Chicago, Whitney Museum of American Art, Dallas Museum of Art, and the San Francisco Museum of Modern Art.
