= Robert Morris (artist) =

American sculptor, conceptual artist and writer (1931 - 2018)

- The "infamous" 1974 self-constructed body art poster of Robert Morris by Rosalind Krauss
- Born: February 9, 1931; Kansas City, Missouri, U.S.
- Died: November 28, 2018 (aged 87); Kingston, New York, U.S.
- Education: University of Kansas, Kansas City Art Institute, Reed College, Hunter College
- Known for: Sculpture
- Movement: Minimalism
- Spouse(s): Simone Forti (m.1955 - d.1962); Priscilla Johnson; Lucile Michels

Robert Morris (February 9, 1931 – November 28, 2018) was an American sculptor, conceptual artist and writer. He was regarded as having been one of the most prominent theorists of minimalism along with Donald Judd, but also made important contributions to the development of performance art, land art, the Process Art movement, and installation art. Morris lived and worked in New York. In 2013 as part of the October Files, MIT Press published a volume on Morris, examining his work and influence, edited by Julia Bryan-Wilson.

== Early life and education ==
Born in Kansas City, Missouri to Robert O. Morris and Lora "Pearl" Schrock Morris. Between 1948 and 1950, Morris studied engineering at the University of Kansas. He then studied art at both the University of Kansas and at Kansas City Art Institute as well as philosophy at Reed College . He interrupted his studies in 1951-52 to serve with the United States Army Corps of Engineers in Arizona and Korea. He married dancer Simone Forti in 1955 and later divorced in 1962. After moving to New York City in 1959 to study sculpture, he received a master's degree in art history in 1963 from Hunter College.

== Work ==
Two Columns (1961/2018) at the National Gallery of Art in 2022

Initially a painter, Morris’ work of the 1950s was influenced by Abstract Expressionism and particularly Jackson Pollock. While living in California, Morris also came into contact with the work of La Monte Young, John Cage, and Warner Jepson with whom he and first wife Simone Forti collaborated. The idea that art making was a record of a performance by the artist (drawn from Hans Namuth’s photos of Pollock at work) in the studio led to an interest in dance and choreography. During the 1950s, Morris' furthered his interest in dance while living in San Francisco with his wife, the dancer and choreographer Simone Forti. Morris moved to New York City in 1960. In 1962 where he staged the performance Column at the Living Theater in New York based on the exploration of bodies in space in which an upright square column after a few minutes on stage falls over.

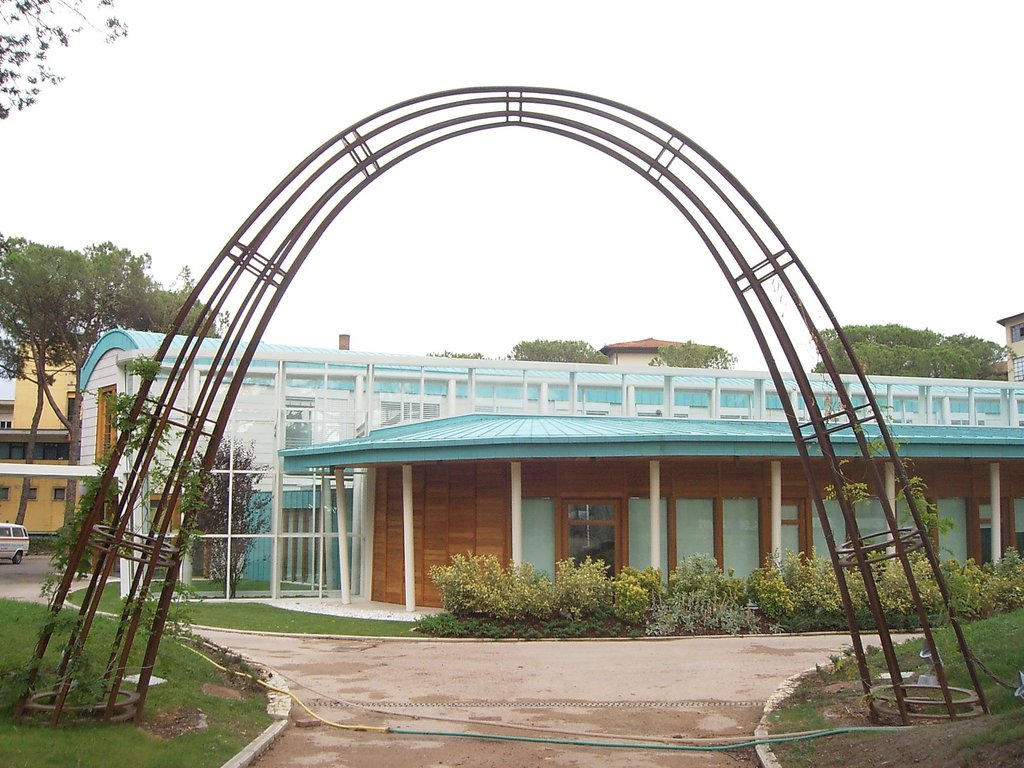
Bronze Gate (2005) is a cor-ten steel work by Robert Morris. It is set in the garden of the dialysis pavilion in the hospital of Pistoia, Italy.

In New York City, Morris began to explore the work of Marcel Duchamp, making conceptual pieces such as Box with the Sound of its Own Making (1961) and Fountain (1963). In 1963 he had an exhibition of Minimal sculptures at the Green Gallery in New York that was written about by Donald Judd. The following year, also at Green Gallery, Morris exhibited a suite of large-scale polyhedron forms constructed from 2 x 4s and gray-painted plywood. In 1964 Morris devised and performed two celebrated performance artworks 21.3 in which he lip syncs to a reading of an essay by Erwin Panofsky and Site with Carolee Schneemann. Morris enrolled at Hunter College in New York (his masters thesis was on the work of Brâncuși) and in 1966 published a series of influential essays "Notes on Sculpture" in Artforum. He exhibited two L Beams in the seminal 1966 exhibit, "Primary Structures" at the Jewish Museum in New York.

In 1967 Morris created Steam, an early piece of Land Art. In 1969, he received a Guggenheim Fellowship for Fine Arts. By the late 1960s Morris was being featured in museum shows in America but his work and writings drew criticism from Clement Greenberg. His work became larger scale taking up the majority of the gallery space with series of modular units or piles of earth and felt. Untitled (Pink Felt) (1970), for example, is composed of dozens of sliced pink industrial felt pieces that have been dropped on the floor. In 1971 Morris designed an exhibition for the Tate Gallery that took up the whole central sculpture gallery with ramps and cubes. He published a photo of himself dressed in S&M gear in an advertisement in Artforum, similar to one by Lynda Benglis, with whom Morris had collaborated on several videos.

He created the Robert Morris Observatory in the Netherlands, a "modern Stonehenge", which identifies the solstices and the equinoxes. It is at coordinates 52°32'58"N 5°33'57"E.

During the later 1970s, Morris switched to figurative work, a move that surprised many of his supporters. Themes of the work were often fear of nuclear war.

In 2002, Morris designed a set of seventeen pale blue and beige-coloured stained-glass windows for the medieval Maguelone Cathedral, near Montpelier in France. The windows, which depict the ripples of a pebble dropped in water, were produced by Ateliers Duchemin glassmakers and placed in restored romanesque window lights around the cathedral building.

At the time of his death in late November 2018 an exhibit of Morris' recent work "Banners and Curses" was on display at the Leo Castelli Gallery in New York City. The exhibition ran through January 25, 2019. Morris attended the opening night reception for the show at the gallery.

== Death ==
Morris died on November 28, 2018, in Kingston, New York, from pneumonia at the age of 87. He had married Lucile Michels in 1984. He is survived by his wife Lucile and a daughter Laura Morris.

== Artist books ==
- Hurting Horses, 64 pages, 23,5 x 16,5 cm. Limited edition of 1500 copies. Produced and published in 2005 by mfc-michèle didier.

== Writing ==
- Continuous Project Altered Daily: The Writings of Robert Morris, October Books, MIT Press
- 'Notes on Sculpture

== Critical reception ==
In 1974, Robert Morris advertised his display at the Castelli Gallery with a poster showing him bare-chested in sadomasochistic garb. Critic Amelia Jones argued that the body poster was a statement about hyper-masculinity and the stereotypical idea that masculinity equated to homophobia. Through the poster, Morris equated the power of art with that of a physical force, specifically violence.

Robert Morris's art is fundamentally theatrical. (…) his theater is one of negation: negation of the avant-gardist concept of originality, negation of logic and reason, negation of the desire to assign uniform cultural meanings to diverse phenomena; negation of a worldview that distrusts the unfamiliar and the unconventional. (Maurice Berger, Labyrinths: Robert Morris, Minimalism, and the 1960s, p. 3.)

In Morris' book, Continuous Project Altered Daily: The Writings of Robert Morris, the artist includes a collaborative project with the art critic G. Roger Denson in which he lampoons the criticism of his work published over the course of his career up to the early 1990s. The chapter, entitled "Robert Morris Replies to Roger Denson (Or Is That a Mouse in My Paragon?)", lists thirteen questions submitted by Denson, with each question representing the criticism of Morris' work written by a different unnamed critic responding to a specific exhibition, installation, or art work. Instead of answering the questions, Morris has written an elaborate, comically absurd, satirical narrative that in many ways epitomizes the "only possible response" to criticism that had become fashionable in the so-called "demise of criticism" that some writers of the 1980s and 1990s heralded following the "deconstruction of logocentrism" postulated by the post-structuralist theorist Jacques Derrida. As one commentator, Brian Winkenweder, wrote:

"In his reply [to Denson's questions], Morris compartmentalized diverse aspects of his oeuvre into nine, cleverly-named alter-egos such as Body Bob, Major Minimax, Lil Dahlink Felt, Mirror Stagette, Dirt Macher and Blind. He also appropriated the brick-hurling Ignatz Mouse from George Herriman's comic strip Krazy Kat as rhetorical flourish to enhance his written answers to Denson's questions."

Winkenweder then cites the mockery to which Morris' critics are subjected in his absurdist satire, as bricks are hurled at each of Denson's questions.

"Hey, what's going on, Ignatz? Everybody is rolling on the floor and laughing. I've never seen such a hysterical gang of assassins. What, you read that ticket about our 'new tone of ironic self-reference?' And what? Body Bob threw the I-Box at the Major who then bent Stagette out of shape with the Corner Piece and Blind smeared cup grease on Dirt Macher's … wait a minute, Ignatz. You started this bedlam by throwing bricks at everyone, I bet....Get Body Bob out of that Kraut helmet immediately…No, I did not give it to Lil Dahlink Felt with the Card File. How could you think such a thing, Ignatz? You are so surly today. Why don't I punch my own ticket?" (Morris, 1993, 307).

== Exhibitions ==
Morris' first exhibition of paintings was held in 1958 at the Dilexi Gallery in San Francisco. Numerous museums have hosted solo exhibitions of his work, including the Whitney Museum of American Art in New York (1970), the Art Institute of Chicago (1980), the Museum of Contemporary Art, Chicago and the Newport Harbor Art Museum (1986), and the Corcoran Gallery of Art, Washington, D.C. (1990).

In 1994, the Solomon R. Guggenheim Museum, New York, organized Robert Morris: The Mind/Body Problem, a major retrospective of the artist’s work, which traveled to the Deichtorhallen in Hamburg and the Musée National d'Art Moderne in Paris.

In 2024, the Pérez Art Museum Miami, included his work Untitled (Mirror Cubes) in Every Sound Is a Shape of Time: Selections from PAMM's Collection, a comprehensive exhibition of diverse artworks spanning nearly thirty years of the institution's collecting practices.

== Notable works ==
- Box with the Sound of Its Own Making (1961), Seattle Art Museum
- Untitled (Mirrored Cubes) (1965), Pérez Art Museum Miami
- Steam Work for Bellingham-II (1974), Western Washington University Public Sculpture Collection, Bellingham, Washington
- Untitled (L-Beams) (1965), Whitney Museum of American Art, New York
- Labyrinth, 1982 Gori Collection, Italy

== Art market ==
As a conceptual artist, Morris at times contractually removed work from circulation. When a collector, the architect Philip Johnson, did not pay Morris for a work he had ostensibly purchased, the artist drew up a certificate of deauthorization that officially withdrew all aesthetic content from his piece, making it nonexistent as art.

== See also ==
- Robert Morris Earthwork
