= Runnymede Sculpture Farm =

Sculpture park in Woodside, California, United States

Coordinates: 37.444668°N 122.274911°W

Runnymede Sculpture Farm is a private sculpture park in Woodside, California. It displays approximately 140 pieces of contemporary sculpture on 120 acres. The land was purchased in 1930 by Alma Spreckels Rosekrans, the daughter of California Palace of the Legion of Honor founders Adolph B. Spreckels and Alma de Bretteville Spreckels. Rosekrans purchased the farm for her horses and named it after her father's prized stallion, Runnymede, sire of Kentucky Derby winner Morvich.
