= Forrest Myers =

American sculptor (born 1941)

- Born: Forrest Warden Myers; 1941 (age 84–85); Long Beach, California, U.S.
- Other name: Frosty Myers
- Education: San Francisco Art Institute
- Occupation: Sculptor
- Known for: Moon Museum, The Wall

Forrest Warden "Frosty" Myers (born 1941) is an American sculptor. He is best known for his pieces Moon Museum (1969) and The Wall (1973), the latter being a monumental wall sculpture in the SoHo, Manhattan, neighborhood of New York City. He lives and works in Brooklyn, New York and Damascus, Pennsylvania.

== Biography ==
Myers studied at the San Francisco Art Institute, from 1958 to 1960; and moved to New York City in 1961. During the early to mid-1960s, he was a founding member of The Park Place Gallery.

His large steel Untitled from 1969 to 1970 is included in the outdoor plaza at The Governor Nelson A. Rockefeller Empire State Plaza Art Collection in Albany, New York.

Myers has been interviewed by several television outlets. His life and career are the subject of the documentary film The Art and Times of Frosty Myers, which covers the New York art scene of the 1960s and 1970s.

With his wife Debra Arch Myers, Frosty divides his time between homes in Damascus, Pennsylvania, where there is a large museum of his work and a sculpture garden, and St. Augustine, Florida.
