= St. John's Park =

Former park in Manhattan, New York

Coordinates: 40.7212°N 74.0075°W

Location in Lower Manhattan

St. John's Park was a 19th-century park and square, and the neighborhood of townhouses around it, in what is now the Tribeca neighborhood of Lower Manhattan, New York City. The square was bounded by Varick Street, Laight Street, Hudson Street and Beach Street, now also known for that block as Ericsson Place. Although the name "St. John's Park" is still in use, the area was absorbed into the Port Authority of New York and New Jersey's Holland Tunnel exit complex and is inaccessible to the public.

The land was part of a plantation owned by an early settler to New Netherland and was later owned by the English Crown, who deeded it to Trinity Church. The church built St. John's Chapel and laid out "Hudson Square", creating New York City's first development of townhouses around a private park. By 1827, the neighborhood had become known as "St. John's Park" and remained fashionable until about 1850. In 1866, it was sold to Cornelius Vanderbilt's Hudson River Railway Company and became the location of St. John's Park Freight Depot, the railroad's southern terminus. The terminal was demolished in 1927 to allow construction of tunnel exits.

== Early history ==
The land on which the square sits was originally part of Lispernard Meadows, (Note: "Meadows" here is used in the sense of "a low-lying piece of grassland, often boggy and near a river." "Meadow" on the Free Dictionary, citing Collins English Dictionary (2003)) a "swampy wetland" of "upland and salt marsh" which was part of a larger 62-acre (25-hectare) farmstead granted to Dutch immigrant Roeloff Jansen in 1636 by New Amsterdam governor Wouter van Twiller. Jansen died just a year later, and left the land to his widow, Anneke Jans. A contemporary manuscript describes the earliest development of the land in 1639, stating the "plantation [was] new and consist[ed] of recently cleared land [and had] a tobacco house and [was] fenced." Jans's claim was renewed when Peter Stuyvesant granted her a patent in 1654.

When Jans died in 1663, her will stipulated that the land should be liquidated, with the proceeds going to the children from her first marriage. The heirs sold the property in March 1670 to Francis Lovelace, the Royal Governor of the colony, but he lost it when the Dutch reclaimed New Amsterdam in 1672. England recaptured the territory in 1674, and New York governor Edmund Andros claimed the land for the Duke of York. The parcel was leased to various parties for the next quarter of a century.

== Development by Trinity Church ==
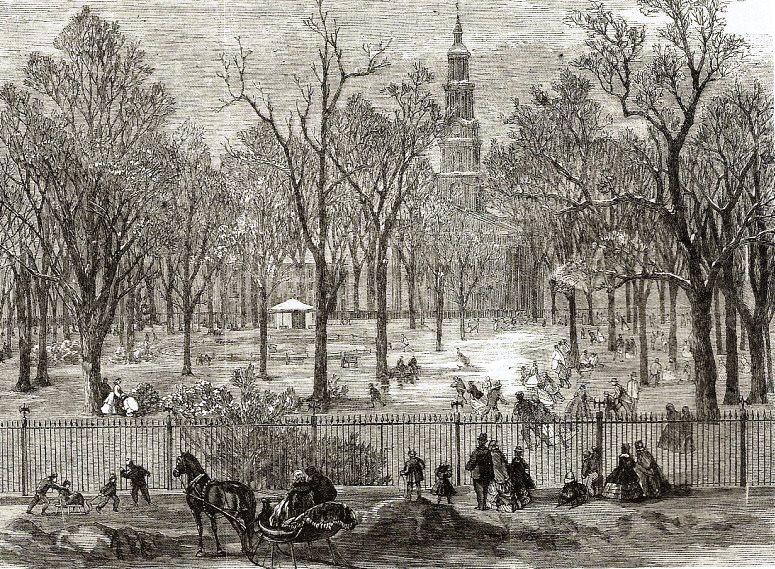
A print of St. John's Park in the winter of 1866, the year it was sold to be replaced by a railroad freight depot. St. John's Chapel can be seen in the background.

In 1700, the land was leased to Trinity Church, which then gained title to the land under a 212-acre (86-hectare) patent from Queen Anne in 1705. During this time, the land became known as the "Church Farm", as Trinity held it as farmland until 1800, when it began to develop the land as New York's population expanded northwards. The parcel, whose southern boundary at the time was North Moore Street, shows up as a square – one of the oldest in New York City – on the Taylor–Roberts plan of 1787, the Goerck–Mangin plan of 1800, and the Bridges Map of 1807, which depicted the city as of 1803.

Trinity's development concept was to create an elite square of residences similar to those in the West End of London, Georgian, Federal and Greek Revival townhouses around a private park – much as Gramercy Park was to do some years later. Trinity received permission from the city's Common Council to enclose the square – whose southern boundary had moved north to Beach Street – and begin development. To attract buyers, in 1803 Trinity began building St. John's Chapel, designed by John McComb, on the Varick Street side of the square.

It took over 20 years for all the lots to be sold and developed, partly because of the swampy topography, but also because the church was only offering 99-year leases, not outright ownership of the lots, with covenants which limited the heights of residences and the materials they were built with. During this period, St. John's Chapel had very few parishioners. The 64 lots were eventually sold when Trinity changed its policy and decided to sell lots outright, deeding the exclusive use of the square to the lot owners. The sales had the attached covenant that if the owners failed to properly keep up the square it would be given to the city for public use.

The square and park began to attract upscale residents, and was continually upgraded, with the addition of gaslight and curbstones, the laying out of streets around the square – which the church laid out, graded and named, but then ceded to the city, the construction of a fence around the park in 1866 to which residents received keys, and extensive landscaping, including gravel paths and flowerbeds, and trees such as catalpas, cottonwoods, horse chestnuts and silver birches. In addition to serving the local residents, the park was used for church events, including annual festivals for children of the parish. During the coldest winters, the park trustees flooded the park to create a large ice skating rink.

By 1827, the "ornate and elegant" neighborhood had achieved a fashionable status, with residents from the "first families" of the city such as Hamilton, Schulyer, Delafield, and Tappan, as well as William Paulding Jr., the mayor of New York City from 1825-1826 and 1827-1829. At around the same time the name "St. John's Park", after the church, had begun to be used instead of "Hudson Square". The square's "polished elegance", which was "in a class with Washington Square and Grancery Park" only lasted a single generation, from 1825-1850. During this time, one observer called it "the fairest interior portion of the city", and the Evening Post in 1847 called it "a spot of Eden lovliness .. It seems as if retiring from the din and tumult of the noisy town to enjoy its own secret solitude.

== Decline of the neighborhood ==
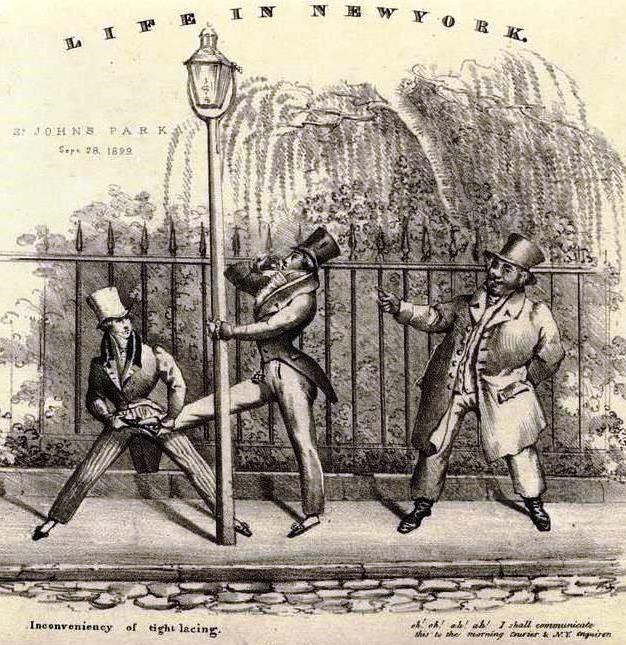
A print from St. John's Park's time as a fashionable neighborhood

The decline of St. John's Park began in the late 1840s and early 1850s when many neighborhoods around it and nearby in Lower Manhattan lost their wealthy residents, who began to move uptown. In particular, when Cornelius Vanderbilt laid railroad tracks for the Hudson River Railroad along the west side of the square in 1851, St. John's Park owners began to leave in large numbers. In 1867, the New York Times wrote about that time: "[W]hen the iron horse began to snort along the streets, and the turmoil of traffic and travel invaded the North River side [of St. John's Park], the "old fogies" became disgusted, and rapidly retreated to more secluded locations." Over the next dozen or so years, the elegant townhouses and mansions around the square and nearby gradually became boarding houses, and the inhabitants of the neighborhood changed from fashionable Knickerbockers to clerks, tradesmen and mechanics. The square itself picked up the nickname of "Hash Square".

Trinity had maintained the right to sell the land with the consent of two-thirds of the owners of the lots. As New York continued to develop, land in lower Manhattan became increasingly valuable, so in 1866 Trinity sold the park to Vanderbilt for $1 million, split between the church and the lot owners. The New York Times commented "The omnivorous appetite of improvement has swept away one more breathing-place in the lower part of the City," but also said:

The transfer to the railroad Company is not to be regretted. As a park it has never been available, save to the few who rented [sic] property nearby. The people now living there are tenants and wanderers, and there are very few property rights that can be damaged by the change. The establishment of a great freighting business there will pretty surely open up all the streets from Franklin to Canal for mercantile business, and add vastly to the wealth of the west side of the Ward ... And so, while we cannot repress a feeling of sorrow when we see the remorseless hand of Improvement sweeping down historical monuments, we find consolation in the fact that this particular improvement will be for the benefit of the City, and especially of the locality most nearly affected.

Decades later, in 1918, the neighborhood received another blow when St. John's Chapel was torn down.

== Freight terminal ==
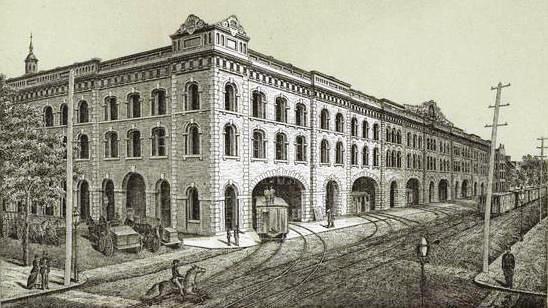
The freight building constructed for the Hudson River Railroad

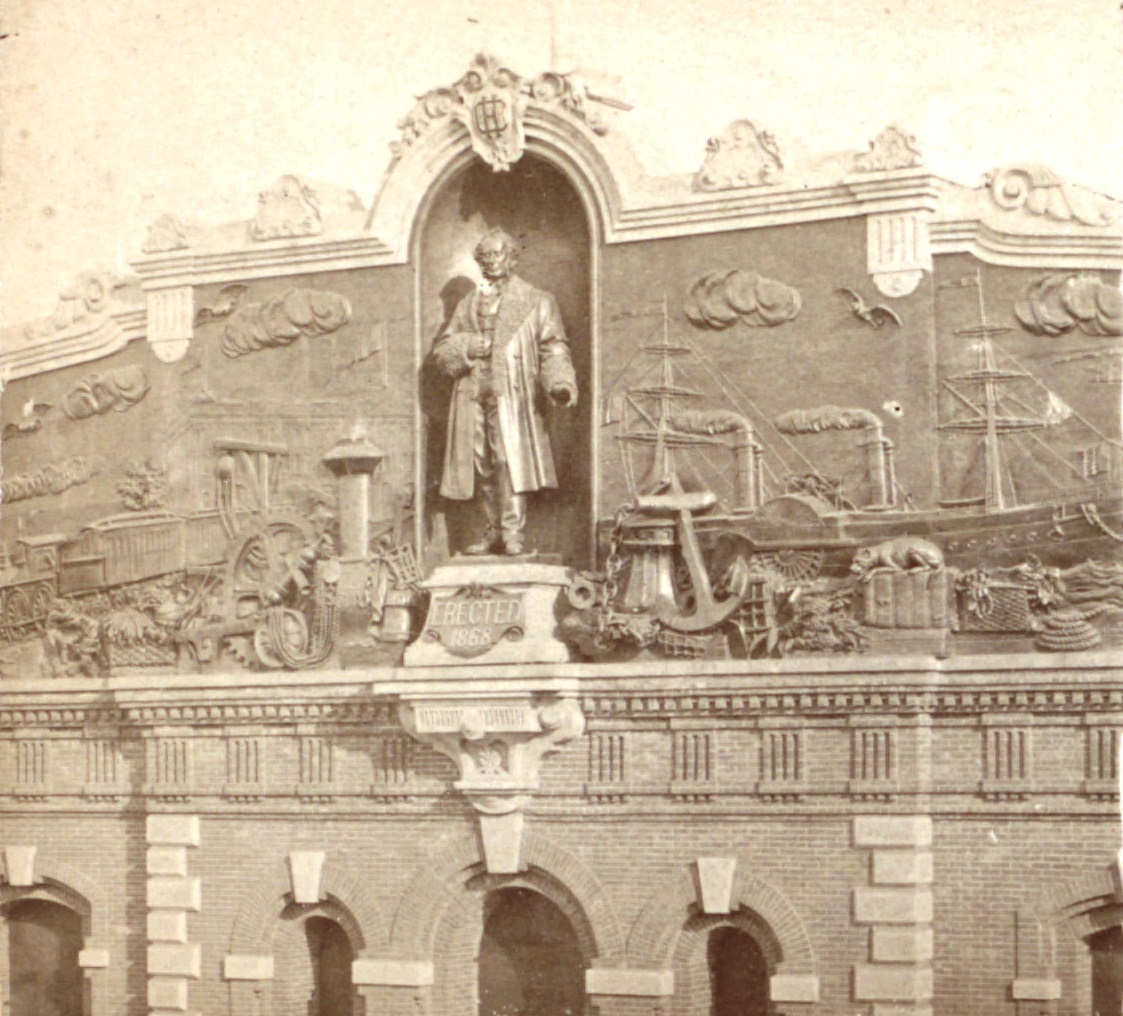
Bas relief on the HRRR terminal at St. John's Park, ca. 1868

Immediately after acquiring the property, Vanderbilt put up a one-story train shed as a temporary measure to terminate the new West Side Line, but soon, in 1867, construction of a state-of-the art 4-acre (1.6-hectare), $2 million "St. John's Park Freight Depot" began when 200 trees were cut down in the square. The three-story red brick terminal, designed by John Butler Snook with Romanesque details, featured a bronze statue of Vanderbilt, which diarist George Templeton Strong called "bestial", on a 150-foot pediment. The pediment, unveiled in November 1869, depicted various components of Vanderbilt's life, including his steamships and trains. It was moved to Grand Central Terminal in 1929.

The fireproof terminal, which could accommodate 96 cars on 8 tracks and was an important shipping point for goods heading west, employed 30 office clerks, and as many as 300 laborers who dealt with up to 140 cars that might pass through in a week. There were two platforms for the transfer of goods, and the top two stories of the terminal were the Frederick C. Linde warehouse, for both general and cold storage. The terminal was well sited to handle dry goods and groceries from wholesale merchants in the surrounding area. The line of carts waiting to load or offload backed up West Broadway to Canal Street, and was present around the clock.

The advent of the terminal transformed the lower West Side into a hodgepodge of "bonded and general storage warehouses", stockyards, abattoirs, grain depots, and stables where cattle, sheep and hogs were bought, sold, slaughtered and shipped. This transition started even before the terminal was constructed – in 1866 the American Express Company Stable was built at 4-8 Hubert Street – but picked up in speed once the depot was in operation. The redevelopment of the area, predicted by the Times in 1867, did not occur, possibly due to the economic depression of the city in the 1870s. By 1893, a reporter wrote that the terminal had "crushed the region utterly, so far as its fitness to be an abiding place of polite society was concerned." She reported that the local population was largely "longshoreman, laborers and teamsters" of Italian and German descent, living in mansions turned into tenements, some of which had as many as 800 residents.

The name "St. John's Freight Terminal" was retained when the New York Central Railroad, successor to the Hudson River Railroad, built a new terminal at 550 Washington Street when it raised its tracks above street level to alleviate the problem of the numerous accidents caused by the combination of trains, traffic and pedestrians. The new depot – which opened in 1934 – served as the terminus of the elevated High Line.

== Holland Tunnel exits ==
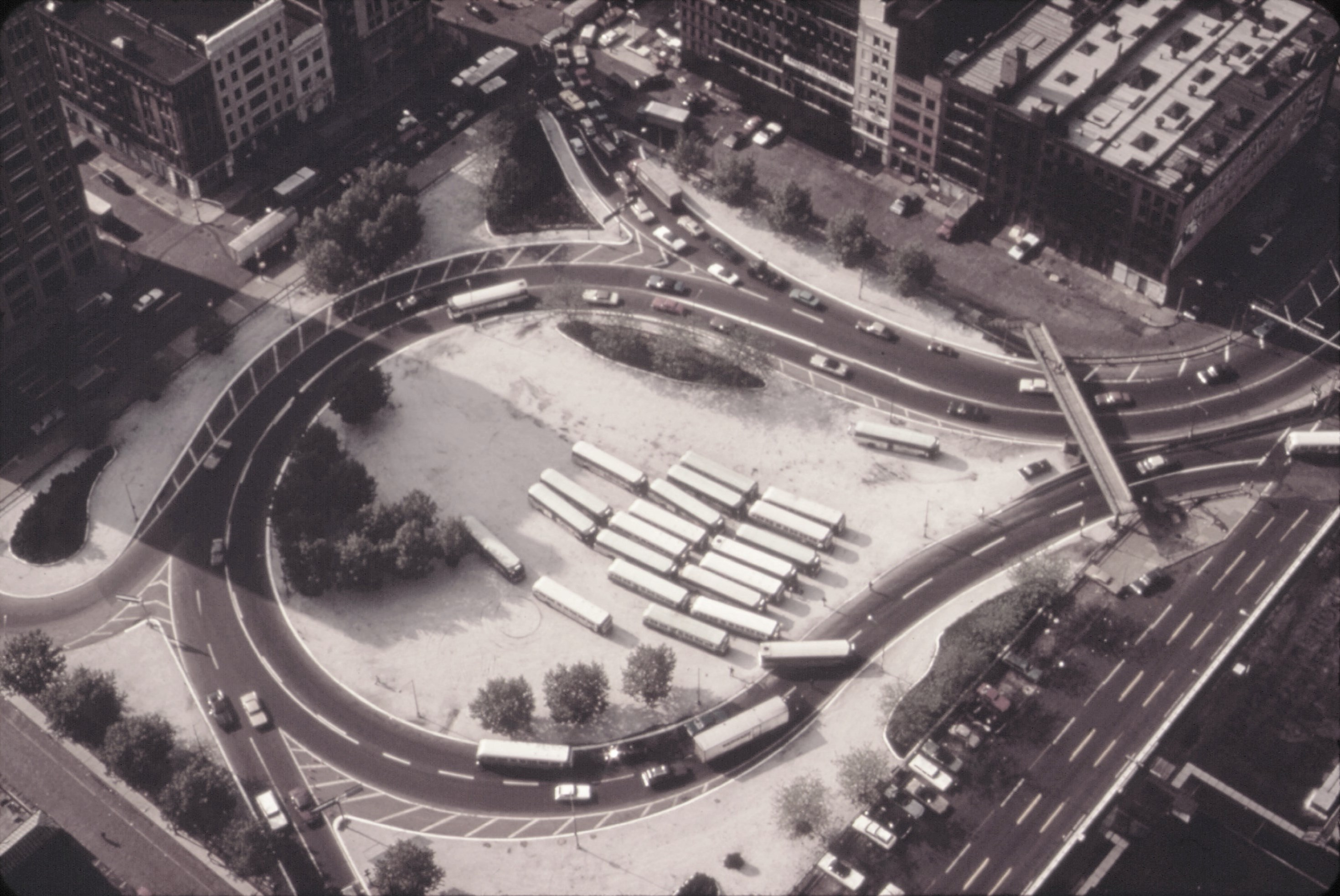
Aerial shot from 1973 of the Holland Tunnel exit rotary; a fifth exit was added in 2004

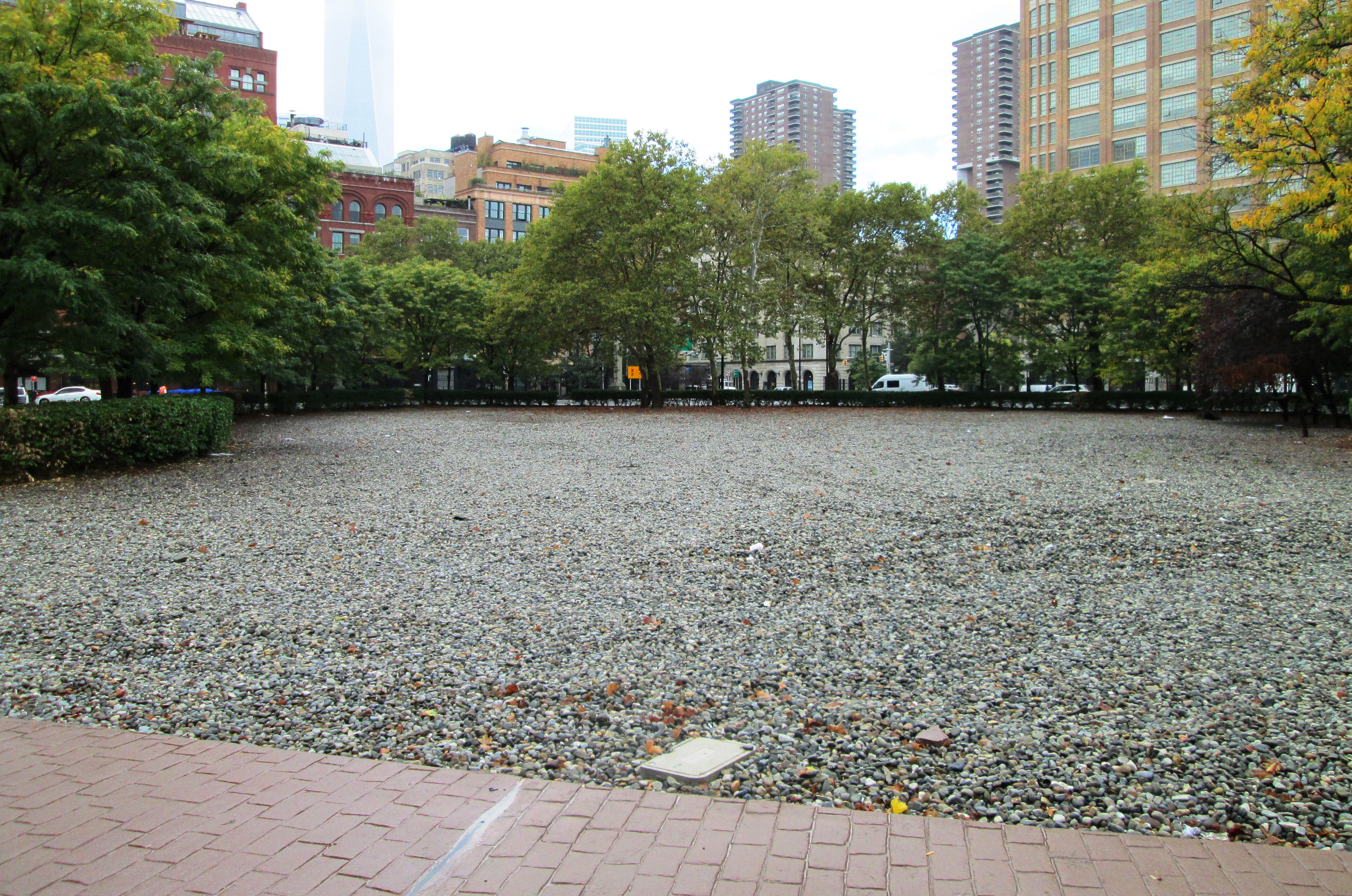
The interior space (2014); in 2010 the AIA Guide to New York City called it a "circular wasteland"

The 1867 train depot was razed in 1927, and was used as a truck yard before becoming the eastbound exits (Note: The exits are: Exit 1: "West Street" (NY Route 9A) via Laight Street; Exit 2: "Uptown" via Hudson Street; Exit 3: "Brooklyn" via Walker Street and Canal Street to the Manhattan Bridge; Exit 4: "Downtown" via Varick Street (added 2004); Exit 5: "Canal Street" east via Laight Street) of the Holland Tunnel, which carries Interstate 78. The Holland Tunnel Exit Plaza, located within the city block now owned by the Port Authority of New York and New Jersey (PANYNJ), consists of a teardrop-shaped roadway. The roadway provides five exits from the tunnel, which sort traffic down a number of city streets. The original structure had four exits, but the plaza was renovated – including landscaping by Studio V Architecture and Ives Architecture Studio – and a fifth exit added in 2004. The gravel-paved, partially tree-lined, inner portion of the plaza inside the rotary, is still referred to as "St. John's Park" and appears on Google Maps as such, but the property is marked with "No Trespassing" signs and the interior is thus not accessible to pedestrians.

The interior was the site of St. John's Rotary Arc, a sculpture by Richard Serra, from 1980 to 1987, and Joie de Vivre, a sculpture by Mark di Suvero, between 1998 and 2006.

In 2010, the AIA Guide to New York City called the interior space a "circular wasteland" and commented: "Our ancestors preserved many a New York treasure, but blew it here."
