= The Calling (di Suvero) =

Public artwork by Mark di Suvero

- Artist: Mark di Suvero
- Year: 1981-1982
- Dimensions: 1,200 cm (480 in)
- Location: terminus of E. Wisconsin Ave., Milwaukee; 43°2′21.206″N 87°53′58.065″W
- Owner: Milwaukee Art Museum

The Calling is a public artwork by American artist Mark di Suvero located in O'Donnell Park, which is on the lakefront in Milwaukee, Wisconsin, United States. The artwork was made in 1981-82 from steel I-beams painted an orange-red color. It measures 40 ft (12 m) in height, and it sits at the end of Wisconsin Avenue in front of the footbridge that leads to the Milwaukee Art Museum.

== Description ==
di Suvero's artwork was commissioned by an anonymous donor. It stands tall at 40 feet and is made from steel I-beams, which the artist painted an orange-red color. The sculpture resembles a rising sun, and is colloquially called the Sunburst. It currently sits in O'Donnell Park, next to the Milwaukee County War Memorial building and in front of the Milwaukee Art Museum. When the piece was first commissioned, the Milwaukee Art Museum did not extend to its present location. The sculpture's backdrop consisted of the bluff and Lake Michigan. With the rising sun behind it, The Calling truly captured di Suvero's intent.

== Information ==
Milwaukee's downtown lakefront had been a transportation hub since the 19th century. In 1968 the lakefront's railroad passenger depot was torn down. The site was developed into a parking lot and an urban park. In 1980 the Milwaukee Department of City Development decided to place a sculpture in this new urban park, and asked the Milwaukee Art Museum to select an artist to make the piece. The Milwaukee Art Museum chose Mark di Suvero, while an anonymous donor offered to fund the sculpture. Di Suvero's design for The Calling dated back to 1975 when he did some drawings for Emily and Joseph Pulitzer, Jr. The sculpture was never built, but when the artist came to Milwaukee and visited the proposed site for his work, he knew that the strong verticals of The Calling were needed to complement the scale of the bluff and the lake.

Since its proposal, The Calling has been fraught with controversy. Community members and politicians have had a problem with the cost, the use of industrial materials, the abstract design, the placement, and the donor's anonymity. Local politicians delayed the building of the sculpture while they debated the sculpture's design, even though the museum owned it. "Gerald Norland, Director of the Art Museum, led the fight for approval throughout most of 1981, presenting its case to eleven separate hearings. Finally, the museum received a favorable vote in the Common Council in January 1982." Di Suvero proceeded to create the sculpture in his New York City studio. Once it was complete, he disassembled The Calling, shipped it to Milwaukee, and directed the reassembly of the piece. It was dedicated in April 1982.

A new controversy arose when the Milwaukee Art Museum's Santiago Calatrava-designed new wing opened in 2001. Dissenters advocated that The Calling be moved as it blocked their view of the new art museum. Di Suvero refused to move the sculpture, stating "If you don't want it, take it apart and ship it to me." When questioned whether the sculpture should be moved, Calatrava deferred to di Suvero. He told Milwaukee architecture columnist Whitney Gould several times that he had designed the museum addition to relate to the placement of "The Calling." The sculpture and its placement continue to be a point of contention between art critics and community members alike.

== Other works ==
- John Raymond Henry, Clement Meadmore, Charles Ginnever, Lyman Kipp, Kenneth Snelson
- Snowplow, 1968, Indianapolis Museum of Art, Indianapolis
- Ulalu, 2001, Bayfront Arts and Science Park, Corpus Christi
- Proverb, Morton H. Meyerson Symphony Hall, Dallas
- Ad Astra, 2005, Northpark Center Mall, Dallas
- Eviva Amore, 2001, Nasher Sculpture Center, Dallas
- For F.B. Yeats, 1987, Nasher Sculpture Center, Dallas
- In the Bushes, 1975, Nasher Sculpture Center, Dallas
- Ave, 1973, Dallas Museum of Art, Dallas
- Bygones, 1976, Menil Collection, Houston
- Clock Knot, 2008, University of Texas, Austin

== Bibliography ==
- Buck, Diane M. and Virginia A. Palmer (1995). Outdoor Sculpture in Milwaukee: A Cultural and Historical Guidebook, The State Historical Society of Wisconsin, Madison. ISBN 0-87020-276-6
