= Shoshone (disambiguation) =

The Shoshone, also spelled Shoshoni, are a Native American people.

Shoshone and Shoshoni may also refer to:

== Places ==
- Shoshone, California
- Shoshone, Idaho
- Shoshone County, Idaho
- Shoshone Falls, a waterfall in Idaho
- Shoshone Basin region of Wyoming
- Shoshone National Forest in Wyoming
- Shoshone River, a river in northwestern Wyoming
- Shoshone Generating Station, a hydroelectric power plant on the Colorado River in Glenwood Springs, Colorado
- Shoshoni Peak, a mountain in Colorado
- Shoshoni, Wyoming

== Other ==
- Shoshoni language, Uto-Aztecan language spoken by the Shoshone people
- Shoshone pupfish, a nearly extinct species of fish that was named by Shoshone
- Shoshone, nickname of the MŠK Žilina association football club and its supporters
- Shoshone (Snake River sternwheeler)
- USS Shoshone, ships of the name
- Shoshone (train), a passenger train operated in the Western United States
- Shoshone (sculpture), a 1981–1982 steel sculpture by Mark di Suvero
