= Are Years What? (for Marianne Moore) =

- Artist: Mark di Suvero
- Year: 1967
- Type: Steel
- Dimensions: 12 m × 12 m × 9.1 m (40 ft × 40 ft × 30 ft)
- Location: Hirshhorn Museum and Sculpture Garden; Washington, D.C., United States; 38.88893100°N 77.02341600°W
- Owner: Smithsonian Institution

Are Years What? (for Marianne Moore) is a sculpture by American artist Mark di Suvero. It is in the collection of the Hirshhorn Museum and Sculpture Garden, in Washington, D.C., United States. The sculpture is named after poet Marianne Moore's "What Are Years". From May 22, 2013 through May 26, 2014, the sculpture resided temporarily in San Francisco, as part of the San Francisco Museum of Modern Art's Mark di Suvero exhibition at Crissy Field.

== Description ==
This 10-ton sculpture is made of nine red-orange steel I-beams, welded together, with one section suspended as a giant mobile with wire, shaped like a "V".

== Information ==
Are Years What? (for Marianne Moore) is signature of di Suvero's monumental early 1960s "open-work constructions." These works utilize cast-off construction materials like chains, metal bars, and ladders. This sculpture is the first that di Suvero built, from beginning to end, with I-beams and using a crane, solely by himself.

=== Acquisition and installation ===
Are Years What? was originally in the collection of the artist, then the collection of Enrico Martignoni of Winnemucca, Nevada. Hirshhorn director James Demetrion first saw the sculpture when it was on display in Brooklyn's Prospect Park. The sculpture was acquired by the Hirshhorn with funds from the Joseph H. Hirshhorn Purchase Fund, a gift from the Institute of Scrap Recycling Industries, and by exchange of the di Suvero artwork ISIS, in 1999. The sculpture was installed on June 13, 1999, by crane into the museum's sculpture garden.

=== Reception ===
The dangling V-shaped piece of the sculpture has been described as representing the prow of a ship, or, as by art critic Irving Sandler as a representation of di Suvero's family's maritime heritage in Venice. Sandler also stated that the acute angles have male and female associations, with the horizontal representing a penis and the vertical "V", a vagina, which di Suvero does not associate with the work. The "V" has also been suggested to represent birds in flight or a "V" for victory. Jayne Merkel believed that Are Years What? exploited the strengths of the I-beams yet "at the same time, he has made a piece that is graceful and well balanced - aesthetically pleasing and intriguing from a number of points of view." Upon the sculpture's installation at the Hirshhorn, The Washington Post received the work as "brilliant in conception," "prominent, beautiful and memorable. It lifts the heart and stays in the mind. It is a gift to the city and all who visit." Are Years What? is considered by some to be di Suvero's "breakthrough work."

=== Exhibition history ===
- Solo show, 1997, Jeanne-Bucher Gallery, Paris
- Solo show, 1995–1996, Storm King Art Center, Mountainville, New York
- Solo show, 1995, Venice Biennale, Venice, Italy
- Solo show, 1994–1995, Valencia Museum of Modern Art, Valencia, Spain
- Mark di Suvero Retrospect, 1991, Museum of Modern Art, Nice
- 1988, Wurttembergischer Kunstverein, Stuttgart, Germany
- Prospect Park, 1975–1976, Whitney Museum of American Art, New York, New York
- Sculpture off the Pedestal, 1970s, Grand Rapids, Michigan
- Plus by Minus, 1968, Albright-Knox Gallery, Buffalo, New York

== Gallery ==
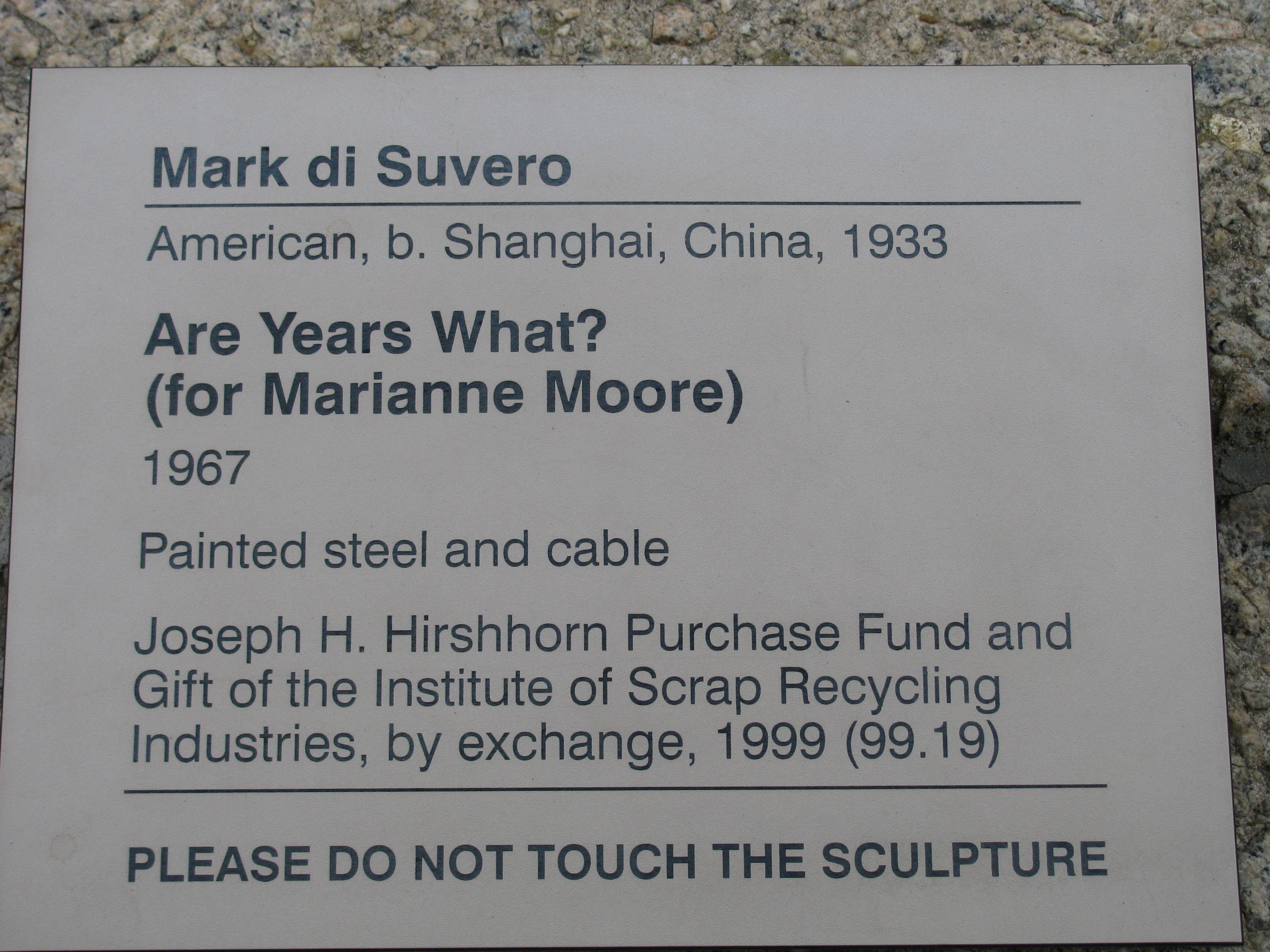

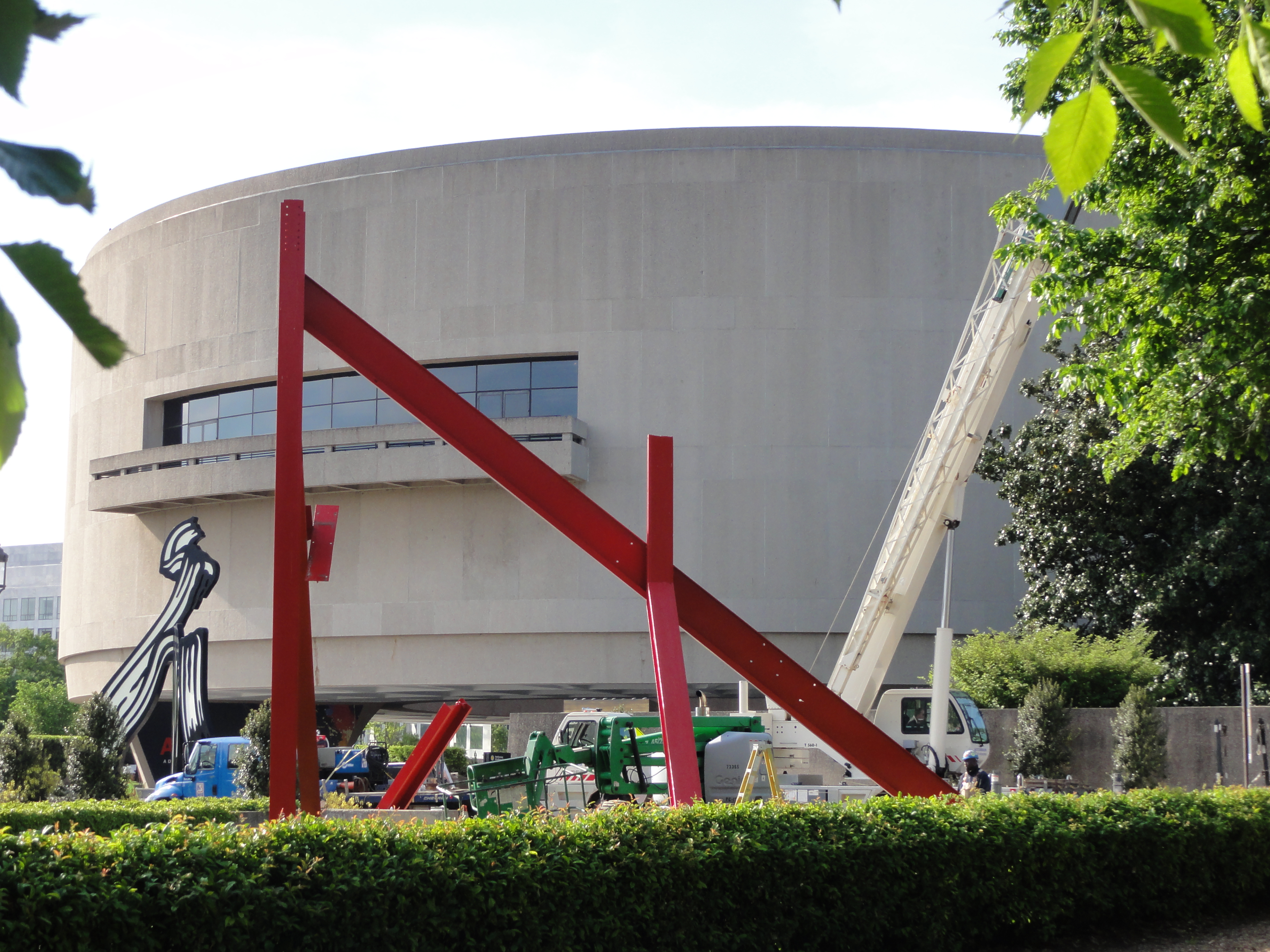
Deinstallation of Mark di Suvero's sculpture, Are Years What? (for Marianne Moore) at the Hirshhorn Museum Sculpture Garden, May, 2013

== See also ==
- List of public art in Washington, D.C., Ward 2
