= Aesop's Fables, II =

Sculpture by Mark Di Suvero

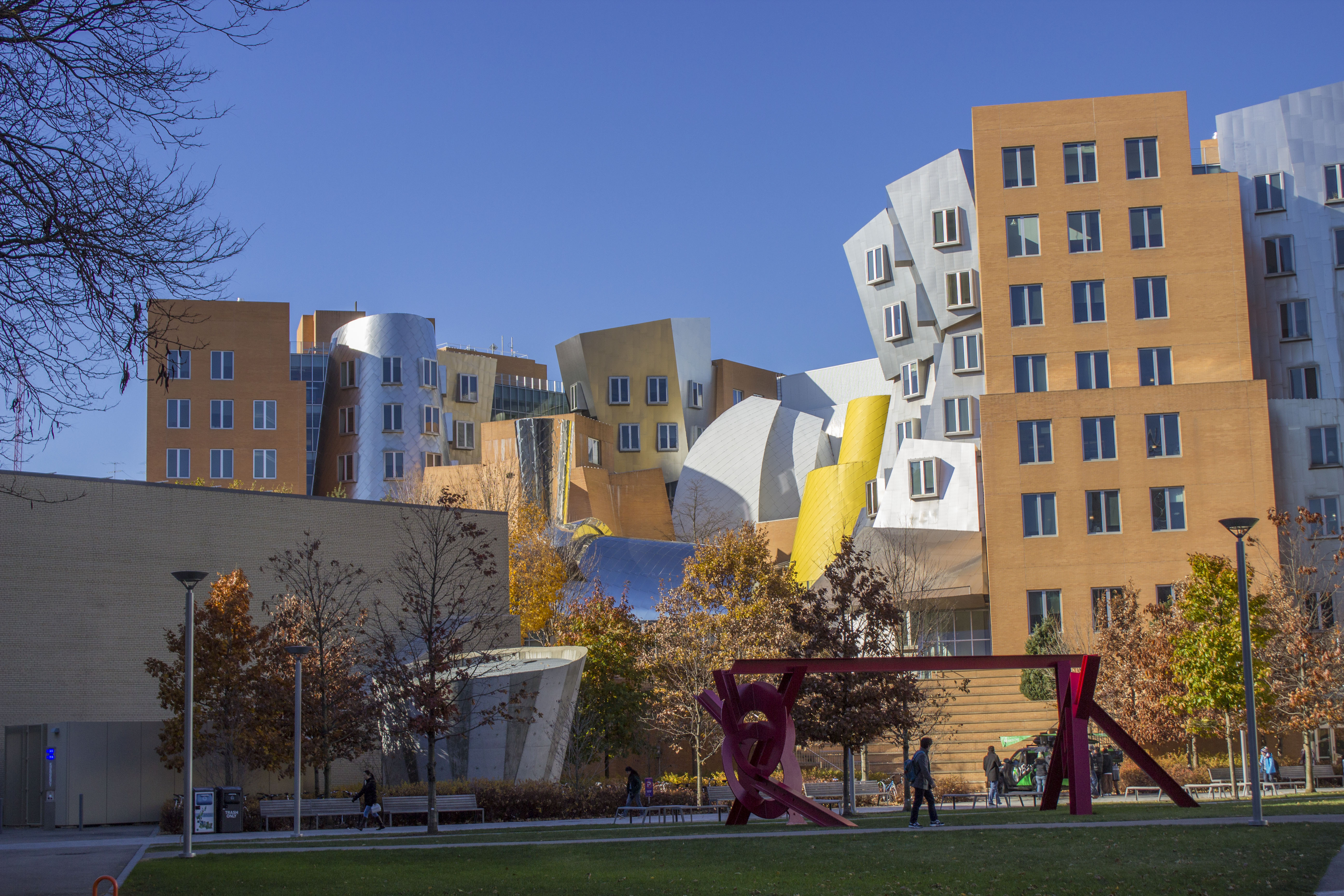
- The sculpture in 2013
- Artist: Mark Di Suvero
- Medium: Steel sculpture
- Location: Cambridge, Massachusetts, United States
- 42°21′40.79″N 71°5′22.01″W

Aesop's Fables, II is a 2005 steel sculpture by Mark Di Suvero, installed on the Massachusetts Institute of Technology (MIT) campus, in Cambridge, Massachusetts, United States.
