= Lao Tzu (disambiguation) =

Lao Tzu refers to:

- Laozi, a legendary Chinese philosopher
- For the book also known as Laozi, see Tao Te Ching
- Lao Tzu (sculpture), sculpture by Mark di Suvero
