= Pin Oak I =

Public art work by John Raymond Henry

Coordinates: 43°10′37.1″N 87°56′16.7″W

- Artist: John Raymond Henry
- Year: 1976
- Type: aluminum
- Location: Lynden Sculpture Garden; Milwaukee, Wisconsin
- Owner: Bradley Family Foundation

Pin Oak I is a public art work by artist John Raymond Henry located at the Lynden Sculpture Garden near Milwaukee, Wisconsin. The sculpture is an abstract form made of aluminum bars painted safety yellow; it has been installed on the lawn.
