= Declaration =

Declaration may refer to:

== Arts, entertainment, and media ==
=== Literature ===
- Declaration (book), a self-published electronic pamphlet by Michael Hardt and Antonio Negri
- The Declaration (novel), a 2008 children's novel by Gemma Malley

=== Music ===
- Declaration (The Alarm album) (1984)
- Declaration (Bleeding Through album) (2008)
- Declaration (Steven Curtis Chapman album) (2001)
- Déclaration, 1973 album by Georges Moustaki
- The Declaration, 2008 album by Ashanti
- Declaration (Red album) (2020)

==== Songs ====
- "Declaration (This Is It)", a 2012 gospel song by Kirk Franklin
- "Declaration", a song by Killswitch Engage from the album The End of Heartache, 2004
- "Declaration", a song by Trivium from the album Ascendancy, 2005
- "Déclaration", a classical song by Leoncavallo
- "The Declaration", a 1970 song by The 5th Dimension

=== Other arts, entertainment, and media ===
- Declaration, a newspaper published in Independence, Virginia
- Declaration (sculpture), a sculpture by Mark di Suvero

== Other uses ==
- Declaration (computer programming), a specification of the identifier, type, and other aspects of language elements
- Declaration (cricket), statement by which the captain of a cricket team declares its innings closed
- Declaration (law), authoritative establishment of fact, with various uses in law
- Declaration (poker), a formal expression of intent to take some action in the card game poker

== See also ==
- Customs declaration
- Declaration of independence, an assertion of the independence of an aspiring state or states
- Declaration of mailing
- Declaration of war, a formal declaration indicating that a state of war exists between nations
- Declarative (disambiguation)
- Declare, a novel by Tim Powers
- Manifesto, a published declaration of principles and intentions of an individual, group or organization
