= Barbara Rose =

American art historian and academic (1936–2020)

- Barbara Rose in 1982 by Timothy Greenfield-Sanders
- Born: Barbara Ellen Rose; June 11, 1936; Washington, D.C., U.S.
- Died: December 25, 2020 (aged 84); Concord, New Hampshire, U.S.
- Education: Barnard College; Columbia University
- Occupations: Art historian; academic; filmmaker
- Years active: 1963–2020
- Spouses: Richard Du Boff (m. 1959; div. 1960) (m. 2009–2020) Frank Stella (m. 1961; div. 1969): Jerry Leiber
- Children: 2

Barbara Ellen Rose (June 11, 1936 – December 25, 2020) was an American art historian, art critic, curator, and college professor. Rose's criticism focused on 20th-century American art, particularly minimalism and abstract expressionism, as well as Spanish art. "ABC Art", her influential 1965 essay, defined and outlined the historical basis of minimalist art. She also wrote a widely used textbook, American Art Since 1900: A Critical History.

== Early life and education ==
Barbara Ellen Rose was born on June 11, 1936, in a Jewish family in Washington, D.C. to Lillian Rose (née Sand) and Ben Rose. Her father owned a liquor store, and her mother was a homemaker. She graduated from Calvin Coolidge High School in the Takoma neighborhood of Washington D.C.

At the age of 17, Rose enrolled at Smith College, but after two years transferred to Barnard College, where she received a B.A. in 1957. She completed her graduate studies at Columbia University, studying with Meyer Schapiro, Julius S. Held, and Rudolf Wittkower, and started work on a PhD, but did not complete it. She was eventually awarded a PhD in history of art by Columbia in 1984. The university accepted "various books by Rose, published between 1970–1983" as her dissertation.

In 1961, she received a Fulbright scholarship to visit Pamplona, Spain, which sparked a lasting interest in Spanish culture and art. The cinematographer Michael Chapman introduced Rose to many New York artists, including Carl Andre and Frank Stella (to whom she was married 1961–69), which gave her an insight into the New York art scene during the 1960s and 1970s.

== Career ==
Rose's first work of criticism was published in 1962. She later noted that formalist art historian Michael Fried suggested she begin writing as a critic. Rose is credited with popularizing the term Neo-Dada in the early 1960s; Harrison notes that Rose's 1963 publication describing pop art as "neo-Dada" was her "entry into the field of contemporary American art criticism". Rose soon argued that formalist criticism was inadequate to then-contemporary art. She observed in a 1966 article that formalism, while appropriate for analysis of Cubism, was not as useful as a critical lens on abstract expressionism and other movements of the later 20th century. She wrote the textbook American Art Since 1900: A Critical History (1967), which became standard in campuses in the 1970s. From 1971 until 1977, she was an art critic for the New York magazine. In 1972, she received a Front Page Award for her article "Artists with Convictions", which described the art program for inmates of the Manhattan House of Detention for Men. She later worked as an instructor at a New York City correctional facility. She served as editor-in-chief of the Journal of Art (from 1988).

From 1981 until 1985, Rose was a senior curator at the Museum of Fine Arts, Houston, where she curated shows including Miró in America and Fernand Léger and the Modern Spirit: An Avant-Garde Alternative to Non-Objective Art, both in 1982. In 1983, she curated the first Lee Krasner retrospective, which exhibited at the Museum of Fine Arts, Houston, and the Museum of Modern Art in New York City. Rose frequently wrote on Krasner's work, describing her as "one of the seminal forces among the Abstract Expressionists"; in a 1977 article entitled "Lee Krasner and the Origins of Abstract Expressionism", she argued that Krasner had been unjustly overlooked by critics. Rose's books include over twenty monographs about artists; many of these were also about women, including Helen Frankenthaler (1971), and she also wrote on Nancy Graves, Beverly Pepper and Niki de Saint Phalle.

Rose taught art history at Sarah Lawrence College (from 1967) and was a visiting lecturer at Yale University (from 1970) and Hunter College (1987); she also taught at University of California, Irvine and University of California, San Diego, where she was Regent's Professor.

She wrote North Star: Mark di Suvero (1977), a documentary film about the sculptor Mark di Suvero.

=== "ABC Art" ===
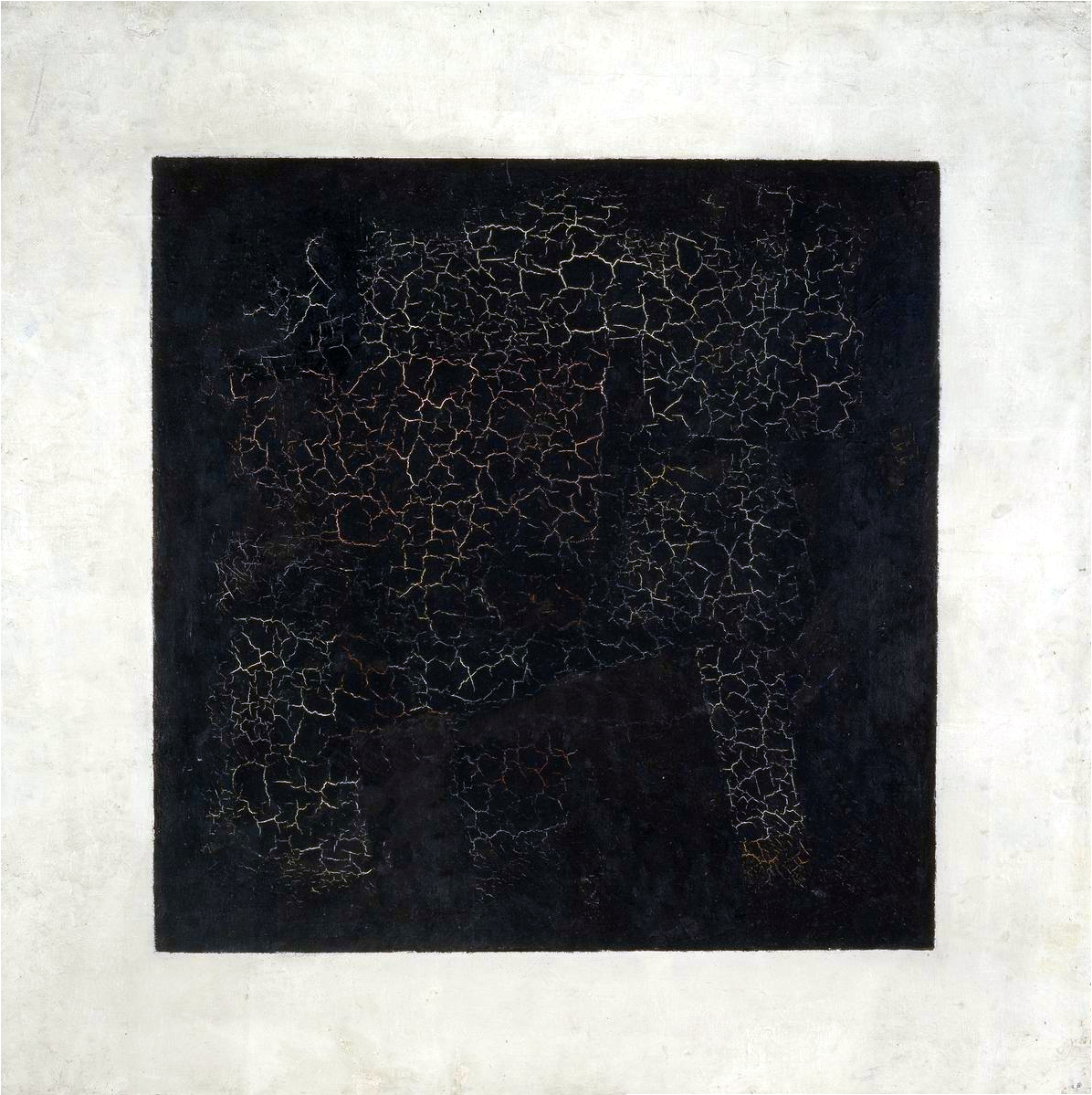
Kazimir Malevich, Black Square (1915). In "ABC Art", Rose described Malevich as one of minimalism's progenitors.

In October 1965, Rose published the essay "ABC Art" in Art in America, in which she describes the fundamental characteristics of what was later known as minimal art. ("ABC art" was one of Rose's suggested names for the movement; she also suggested "reductive art" and "object sculpture".) "ABC Art" considers the diverse roots of minimalism in the work of Kasimir Malevich and Marcel Duchamp, as well as the choreography of Merce Cunningham, the art criticism of Clement Greenberg, the philosophy of Wittgenstein, and the novels of Alain Robbe-Grillet. She regarded Ad Reinhardt as a progenitor of minimalism, and not a minimalist proper. In examining the historical roots of minimal art in 1960s America, Rose drew a distinction between Malevich's "search for the transcendental, universal, absolute" and Duchamp's "blanket denial of the existence of absolute values". Rose further argued in "ABC Art" that minimalist sculpture was at its best when it was inhospitable to its audience: "difficult, hostile, awkward and oversize".

Rose grouped some 1960s artists as closer to Malevich, some as closer to Duchamp, and some as between the two; she argued that the work of some minimalists constituted a "synthesis" of Malevich and Duchamp. Closer to Malevich were Walter Darby Bannard, Larry Zox, Robert Huot, Lyman Kipp, Richard Tuttle, Jan Evans, Ronald Bladen, Anne Truitt. Closer to Duchamp were Richard Artschwager and Andy Warhol. Between Malevich and Duchamp she placed Robert Morris, Donald Judd, Carl Andre, and Dan Flavin. Her conclusion was that minimal art is both transcendental and negative:

The art I have been talking about is obviously a negative art of denial and renunciation. Such protracted asceticism is normally the activity of contemplatives or mystics...Like the mystic, in their work these artists deny the ego and the individual personality, seeking to evoke, it would seem, the semihypnotic state of blank unconsciousness.

She also contrasted minimal art with Pop Art:

...if Pop Art is the reflection of our environment, perhaps the art I have been describing is its antidote, even if it is a hard one to swallow.

== Personal life ==
Rose was married four times to three men. In 1959, she married Richard Du Boff, an economic historian; the marriage ended in divorce after a year. In October 1961 in London, Rose married the artist Frank Stella; they had two children and divorced in 1969. In the mid-1980s, she was living in Italy and purchased a villa in Perugia. She married the lyricist Jerry Leiber in Rome, and the two returned to the U.S. to live in Greenwich Village. The marriage ended in divorce after ten years. Rose remarried Du Boff in 2009.

Rose died from breast cancer on December 25, 2020, under hospice care in Concord, New Hampshire. She was 84.

== Honors and awards ==
- 1967 and 1970: College Art Association, Frank Jewett Mather Award for Distinguished Art Criticism
- 1972: New York, Front Page Award for best column "Artists with Convictions"
- 1980: CINE Golden Eagle award for Lee Krasner: The Long View
- 2010: Order of Isabella the Catholic by the Spanish government for her contributions to art history and Spanish culture

== Selected publications ==
=== Books authored ===
- Rose, Barbara (1966). American Painting: The Twentieth Century. Geneva: Skira. OCLC 562069716.
- Rose, Barbara (1967). American Art Since 1900: A Critical History. New York: F.A. Praeger. ISBN 978-0-275-43900-2. OCLC 1014107611.
- Rose, Barbara (1969). The Golden Age of Dutch Painting. New York: F.A. Praeger. ISBN 978-0-269-67123-4. OCLC 741875627.
- Rose, Barbara (1970). Claes Oldenburg. Museum of Modern Art. OCLC 605363873.
- Miró, Joan; Rose, Barbara; MacCandless, Judith; MacMillan, Duncan (1982). Miró in America. Houston, TX: Museum of Fine Arts, Houston. OCLC 252002405.
- Fabre, Gladys C.; Briot, Marie-Odile; Rose, Barbara (1982). Léger et l'esprit moderne: une alternative d'avant-garde à l'art non-objectif, 1918–1931 (Léger and the modern spirit: an avant-garde alternative to non-objective art, 1918–1931). Paris: Musée d'art moderne de la ville de Paris. OCLC 192111155.
- Rose, Barbara (1983). Lee Krasner: A Retrospective. Houston: Museum of Fine Arts. ISBN 978-0-870-70415-4. OCLC 10527746.
- Rose, Barbara (1988). Autocritique: Essays on Art and Anti-Art, 1963–1987. New York: Weidenfeld & Nicolson. ISBN 978-1-555-84076-1. OCLC 958961360.

=== Books edited ===
- Experiments in Art and Technology (1972). Klüver, Billy; Martin, Julie; Rose, Barbara (eds.). Pavilion. New York: E.P. Dutton. OCLC 864533.
- Reinhardt, Ad; Rose, Barbara (1975). Art As Art: The Selected Writings of Ad Reinhardt. Berkeley: University of California Press. ISBN 978-0-520-07670-9. OCLC 605712700.

=== Articles ===
- Rose, Barbara (October 1965). "ABC Art". Art in America. 53 (5).
- Rose, Barbara (1991). "Gaston Lachaise and the Heroic Ideal," in "Gaston Lachaise, Sculpture". Salander-O'Reilly Galleries, NY.
- Rose, Barbara (February 1993). "Is it art? Orlan and the transgressive act". Art in America. 81: 2.

== Curated exhibitions ==
- 1969: Claes Oldenburg, Museum of Modern Art (New York City)
- 1979: Abstract Painting: The Eighties, Grey Art Gallery, New York University (New York City)
- 1982: Joan Miró, Museum of Fine Arts, Houston (Houston, Texas)
- 1982–1983: Fernand Léger, Musée d'Art Moderne de Paris (Paris); Museum of Fine Arts, Houston (Houston, Texas); Musée Rath (Geneva)
- 1983: Lee Krasner, Museum of Fine Arts, Houston (Houston, Texas); Museum of Modern Art (New York City)
- 1992: Abstract Painting: The '90s, André Emmerich Gallery (New York City)
- 2016: Painting After Postmodernism, Vanderborght Building (Brussels)

== Filmography ==
- 1972: American Art in the 1960s, narrator
- 1972: The New York School, narrator
- 1977: North Star: Mark di Suvero, writer
- 1978: Lee Krasner: The Long View

== See also ==
- Abstract illusionism
- Experiments in Art and Technology

== Sources ==
- Harrison, Sylvia (August 27, 2001). "Barbara Rose: Pop, Pragmatism, and 'Prophetic Pragmatism'". Pop Art and the Origins of Post-Modernism. Cambridge University Press. pp. 115–145. doi:10.1017/cbo9780511497681.006. ISBN 978-0-521-79115-1.
- Levin, Gail (2011). Lee Krasner: A Biography. William Morrow and Company. ISBN 978-0-06-184525-3. OCLC 641532157.
- Ratcliff, Carter (1996). The Fate of a Gesture: Jackson Pollock and Postwar American Art. Farrar, Straus and Giroux. ISBN 0-374-22331-9. OCLC 32236025.
- Strickland, Edward (1993). Minimalism: Origins. Indiana University Press. ISBN 0-253-21388-6. OCLC 45261676.
- Tekiner, Deniz (2006). "Formalist Art Criticism and the Politics of Meaning". Social Justice. 33 (2): 31–44. ISSN 1043-1578. JSTOR 29768369.
