= Poland (sculpture) =

Public art work by Mark di Suvero

Coordinates: 43°10′34.7″N 87°56′08.4″W

- Artist: Mark di Suvero
- Year: 1966
- Type: steel and wire
- Dimensions: 270 cm × 28 cm × 200 cm (105 in × 11 in × 80 in)
- Location: Lynden Sculpture Garden; Milwaukee, Wisconsin
- Owner: Bradley Family Foundation

Poland is a public art work by artist Mark di Suvero located at the Lynden Sculpture Garden near Milwaukee, Wisconsin. The sculpture is an abstract form; it is installed on the lawn.

== Description ==
The sculpture is composed of juxtaposed steel elements including I-beams and a mast. The materials are rusted. The piece features a suspended element attached by wire, allowing it to move with the wind or viewer interaction. Poland reflects di Suvero’s early exploration of movement in sculpture, a theme influenced by his recovery from a paralyzing accident in 1960.
