= Lodgepole (sculpture) =

Public art work by Lyman Kipp

Coordinates: 43°10′37.1″N 87°56′13.3″W

- Artist: Lyman Kipp
- Year: 1968
- Type: painted steel
- Dimensions: 51 cm × 30 cm × 120 cm (20 in × 12 in × 48 in)
- Location: Lynden Sculpture Garden; Milwaukee, Wisconsin
- Owner: Bradley Family Foundation

Lodgepole is a public art work by artist Lyman Kipp located at the Lynden Sculpture Garden near Milwaukee, Wisconsin. The abstract sculpture is a T-shaped form painted red; it is installed on the patio.
