= North Star: Mark di Suvero =

- DVD cover (2011) showing the sculpture Bygones (1976).
- Directed by: François de Menil
- Written by: Barbara Rose
- Produced by: François de Menil; Barbara Rose
- Cinematography: François de Menil
- Edited by: Paul Justman; Lana Jokel; Ralph Rosenblum (cons.)
- Music by: Philip Glass
- Production company: Parrot Productions
- Release date: April 7, 1978
- Running time: 54 minutes
- Language: English

North Star: Mark di Suvero is a 1977 documentary film about Mark di Suvero that was produced by François de Menil and Barbara Rose. Born in 1933, di Suvero has become one of the most recognized sculptors of the late 20th and early 21st centuries. From about 1975 to 1977, fairly early in di Suvero's long career, filmmaker de Menil and art historian Rose produced this film, which was characterized at the time as "a tribute to the extraordinary work and life of the innovative American sculptor of monumental but delicate constructions." The film shows di Suvero making and installing several of his very large sculptures, and incorporates informal interviews of di Suvero, his mother, and others involved in his career and life at that time. From 1971 to 1975 di Suvero, an American, lived in a self-imposed exile in France in protest of US involvement in war in Vietnam and Southeast Asia, and the filming spans the end of his exile and his return to New York.

The film presents the biographical material and interviews in black and white footage, and uses color to present the footage directly related to the creation of di Suvero's sculptures as well as reactions and opinions from passersby and colleagues. Nine of di Suvero's sculptures are featured in the film; the film's title refers to one of these, North Star, which was included in a prominent 1975 outdoor exhibition of di Suvero's sculptures in Paris, France. For each of the featured artworks, Philip Glass composed and performed a short piece of music for the film's score. Glass has been described recently as "one of the most influential - and controversial - contemporary composers". A recording of Glass' score has been issued independently of the film, and was included in a 2012 listing of Glass' ten essential recordings. The film was edited by Paul Justman, Lana Jokel, and Ralph Rosenblum (as "consulting editor"); Rosenblum was a veteran editor who edited several of director Woody Allen's films in the 1970s.

The film was accepted for the 1978 New Directors/New Films Festival at the Museum of Modern Art in New York City. On July 18, 1978, the film was televised nationally in the US, and was favorably reviewed in several periodicals at the time. The film was first released to home video as a DVD in 2011.
