= Clock Knot =

Sculpture in Austin, Texas, U.S.

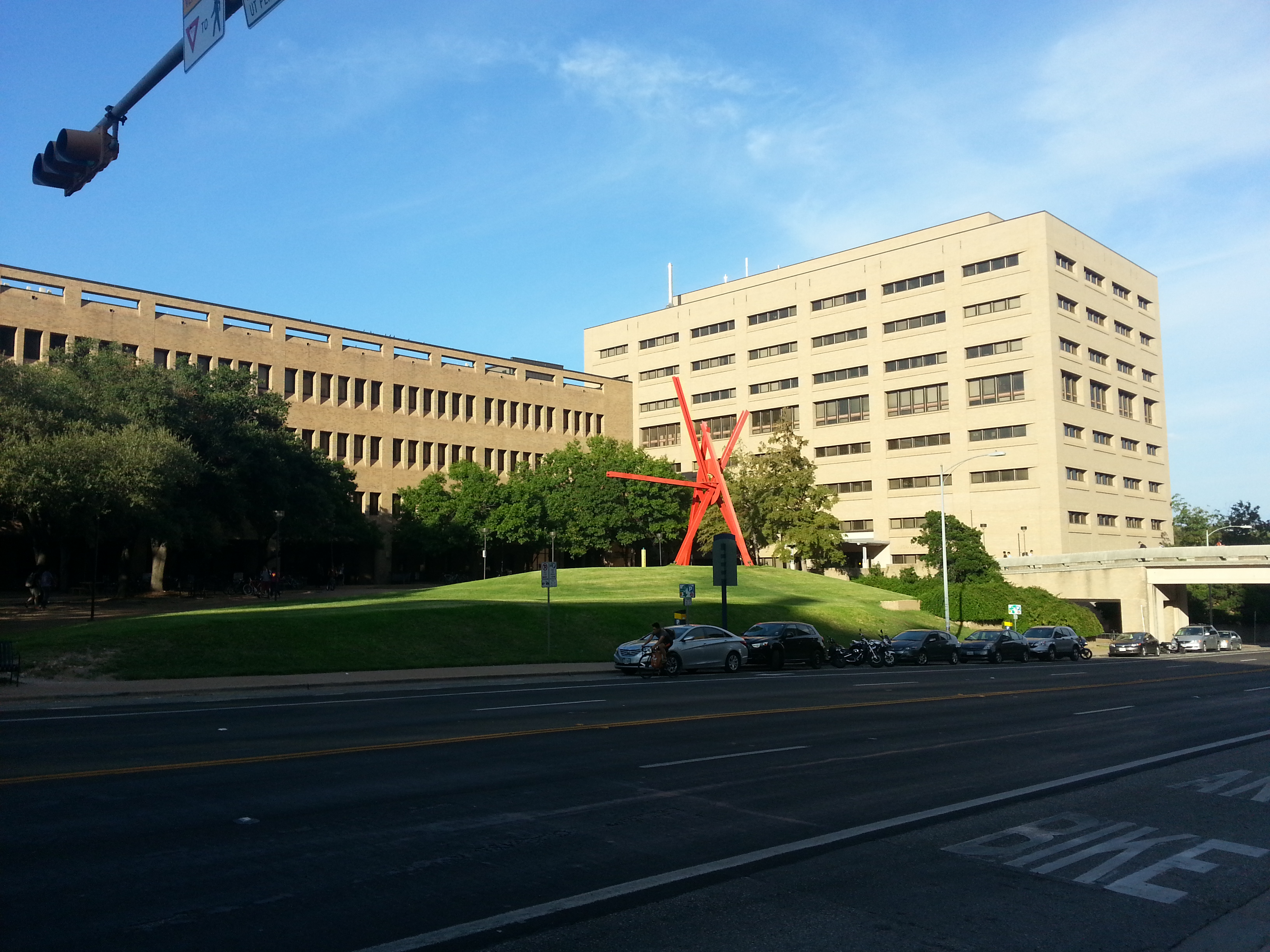
- Clock Knot with the Chemical and Petroleum Engineering Building (left) and Engineering Teaching Center (right) behind.
- Artist: Mark di Suvero
- Medium: Steel sculpture
- Location: Austin, Texas, U.S.
- 30.28972°N 97.736092°W

Clock Knot is an outdoor painted steel sculpture by Mark di Suvero, installed on the University of Texas at Austin campus in Austin, Texas. The approximately 40-foot (12 m) sculpture was installed along Dean Keeton Street in 2007.
