= St. John's Chapel (New York City) =

Chapel in Manhattan, New York

Coordinates: 40°43′16″N 74°00′22″W

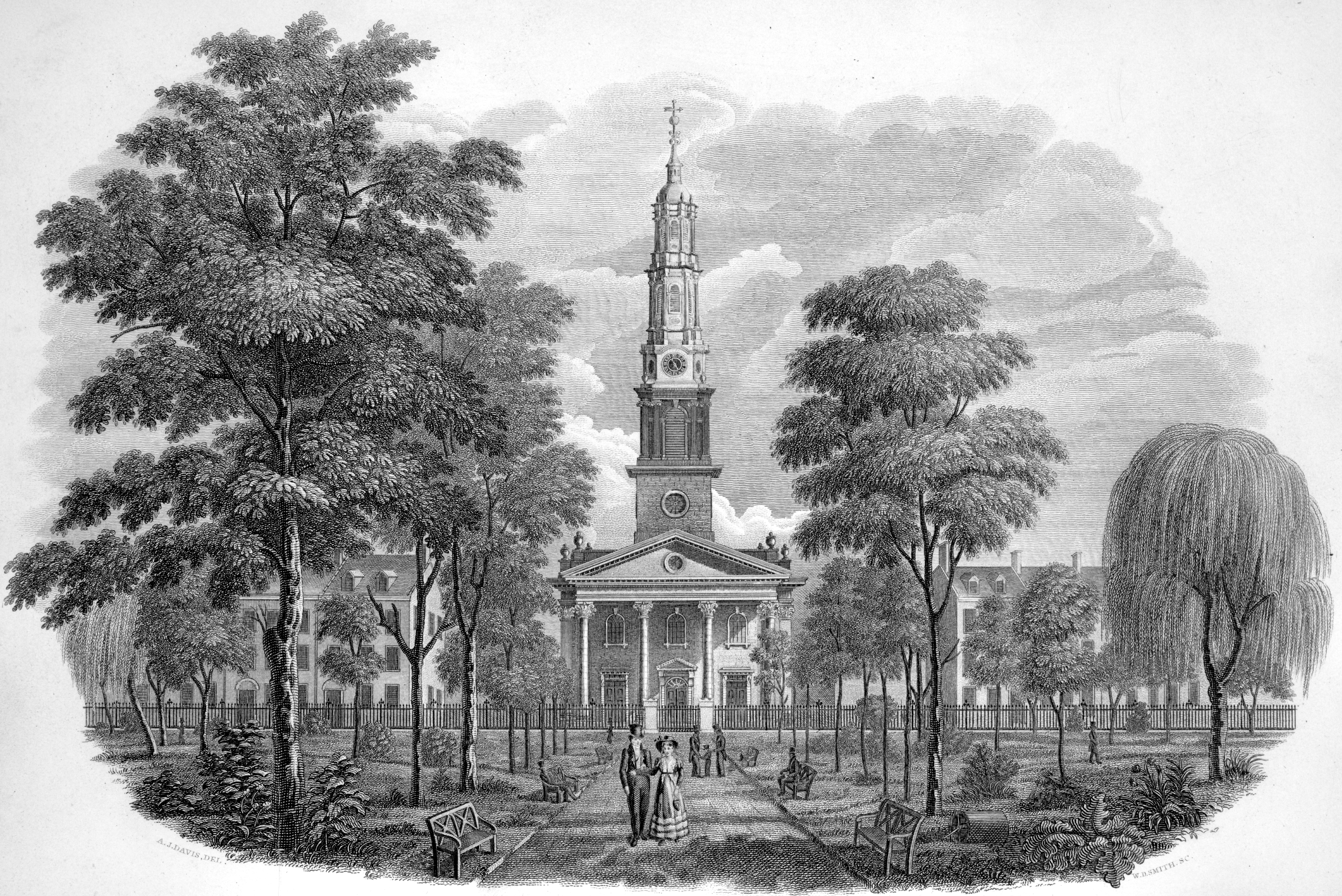
- An engraving of the chapel in the New-York Mirror from 1829.
- St. John's Chapel
- Location: Manhattan, New York City
- Country: United States
- Denomination: Episcopal

Architecture
- Architect(s): John McComb Jr. & Isaac McComb
- Architectural type: Chapel
- Style: Georgian
- Completed: 1807
- Demolished: 1918

Specifications
- Height: 214 feet (65 m)

Administration
- Parish: Trinity Church

St. John's Chapel was a Georgian style church and spire constructed in 1803 which belonged to the Episcopal parish of Trinity Church in Tribeca, Manhattan, New York City. It was demolished in 1918 by the Episcopal Church after losing its worshipers.

== History ==
It was constructed in 1803 to designs by John McComb Jr. and his brother Isaac McComb on Varick Street, facing St. John's Park. McComb gave it a sandstone tetrastyle prostyle portico supporting a tower and multi-storeyed spire that rose to 214¼ feet. Master builders for the chapel have been recorded as T. C. Taylor, Henry Hedley, Daniel Domanick and Isaac McComb. The chancel was added in 1857 to designs by Richard M. Upjohn.

The original location of this church was one of the most attractive in New York. It stood opposite the eastern side of St. John's Park, whose tree-shaded walks were a favorite recreational spot for the well-to-do residents of the neighbourhood. In 1867 Trinity Church, which had retained ownership of the park, sold it to the Hudson River Railroad for a downtown freight terminal. This unfortunate occurrence changed the character of the residential section nearby; the warehouse's undesirable influences were felt for many blocks in every direction. What had been a neighborhood of patrician dwellings was reduced to a slovenly purlieu of ramshackle buildings.

The congregation left in the 1890s and the structure was torn down in 1918. It was cleared during a construction project that widened Varick Street and also facilitated construction of the IRT Broadway – Seventh Avenue Line. City officials wanted to allow the portico to protrude into the widened street and vault the flanking pedestrian sidewalk under it because they recognized the steeple’s importance as a landmark. The Episcopal Church instead decided to demolish the building.
