= Declaration of mailing =

In the United States, a declaration of mailing is a legal document verifying that a document has been sent via mail to a third party, usually required to be sent with documents as proof to a judge or clerk that a set of documents has been mailed. This may be to an individual or group, or attorneys relating to a particular issue. It requires that legally once signed a document has been sent; and if broken the sending party may be liable to charges of perjury or contempt of court.

The document is usually a short form with the following indicated information:

- Business address or contact address; sometimes telephone and fax numbers.
- Name and signature of mailer.
- Names of documents attached.
- Names of parties or attorneys sent to.

== See also ==
- Declaration (disambiguation)
