= Lao Tzu (sculpture) =

Sculpture by Mark di Suvero in Denver, Colorado

- Artist: Mark di Suvero
- Year: 1996
- Medium: and
- Dimensions: 89.916 cm × 50.292 cm × 111.252 cm (29.5 ft in × 16.5 in × 36.5 in)
- Weight: 16,5 tons
- Location: Denver Art Museum, Denver, Colorado, U.S.
- 39.7371°N 104.9888°W

Lao Tzu is a 1996 sculpture by Mark di Suvero, previously installed at Denver's Acoma Plaza at West 13th Avenue, in the U.S. state of Colorado.

The artist wants to bring “doodles” to life in space, aiming to engage viewers with his sculptures. He named this artwork Lao Tzu after the Chinese philosopher who founded Taoism in the 6th century, but insists in not strictly assigning particular meanings to his pieces in order to keep them as abstract as possible.

It was removed and placed in storage at the Denver Art Museum in 2017. There are currently no plans to reinstall the piece.
