= The Lovers (di Suvero) =

Public art work by Mark di Suvero

- Artist: Mark di Suvero
- Year: 1971-73
- Type: steel
- Dimensions: 660 cm × 120 cm × 820 cm (260 in × 48 in × 324 in)
- Location: Lynden Sculpture Garden; Milwaukee, Wisconsin; 43.17654°N 87.93812°W
- Owner: Bradley Family Foundation

The Lovers is a public art work by artist Mark di Suvero located at the Lynden Sculpture Garden near Milwaukee, Wisconsin. The sculpture is an abstract form; it is installed on the lawn.

== Description ==
The sculpture is composed of industrial steel I-beams. The I-beams, a recurring element of di Suvero's work, are cut and welded into a series of crossed bars arranged diagonally and painted red.
