= Joie de Vivre (di Suvero) =

Sculpture by Mark di Suvero in Manhattan, New York, U.S.

- Joy of Life (English)
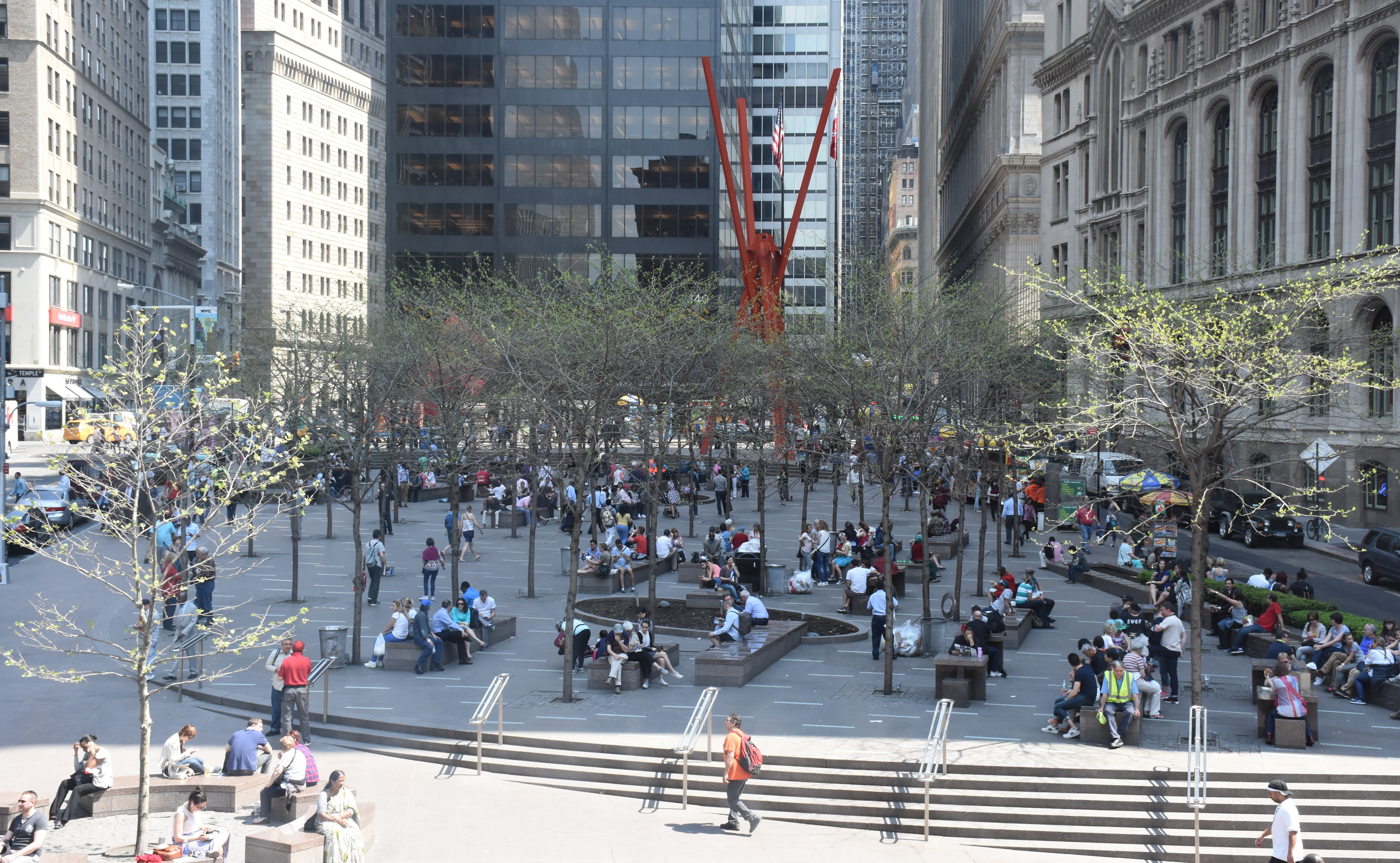
- Artist: Mark di Suvero
- Year: 1998
- Type: Sculpture
- Dimensions: 21 m (70 ft)
- Location: New York City, New York, United States; 40.70897°N 74.01094°W

Joie de Vivre (English: Joy of Life) is an outdoor sculpture by Mark di Suvero, located at Zuccotti Park in the Financial District of Lower Manhattan, New York City. The 70-foot sculpture, composed of "open-ended tetrahedrons", was installed by the intersection of Broadway and Cedar Street in June 2006 and was previously located at the Holland Tunnel rotary (also named St. John's Park).

In October 2011, during Occupy Wall Street, a man climbed Joie de Vivre, where he remained for several hours until he was escorted down by police.
