= Victor di Suvero =

American poet (1927–2021)

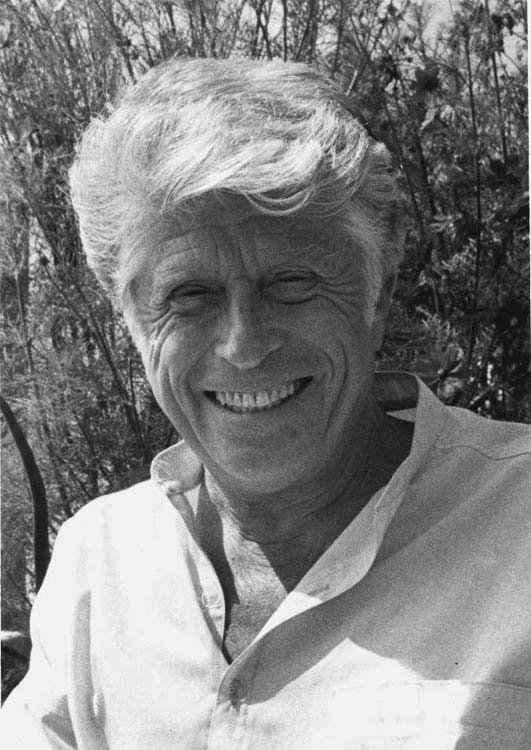
- Born: Victor di Suvero; May 20, 1927; Turin, Italy
- Died: July 6, 2021 (aged 94); Santa Fe, New Mexico
- Education: University of California, Berkeley
- Known for: Poet/Editor

Victor di Suvero (1927–2021) was an American poet, investment manager and entrepreneur. He is associated with the poetry movement referred to as the Berkeley Renaissance.

He is the brother of the sculptor Mark di Suvero, whom he introduced to poetry at an early age.

== Biography ==
Born in 1927 in Turin, Italy di Suvero grew up in China where his father had been stationed in the Italian Diplomatic Service. He came to San Francisco early in 1941 with his family as anti-fascist political refugees.

Victor di Suvero attended the University of Santa Clara and then, wanting to do something to help in the war effort and being too young for the armed forces, he shipped out as a Merchant Seaman at the age of 16 sailing as an able-bodied seaman in the Pacific. He saw service from Guadalcanal to New Guinea and from Bia to Leyte. At the end of the War he returned to California and attended the University of California, Berkeley where he received his BA in Political Science in 1949. At Berkeley he had been the editor of the Occident, the literary magazine of the university and won the Ina Coolbrith Prize for Poetry in that year. While at Berkeley, di Suvero developed a catering service to support himself which later evolved into a series of restaurants which he sold before moving to Sausalito, California where he bought and ran the Contemporary Gallery giving shows to artists such as Wayne Thiebaud and Jean Varda. The development of the gallery led to his establishment of Design and Color Service in 1951 providing art and design advisory services to architects and real estate developers such as Eichler homes, The Draper Companies, and Conway and Culligan in the Bay Area. This exposure soon led him to obtain his own Real Estate License and he then established di Suvero & Company, a Real Estate and Mortgage brokerage firm which he managed developing projects in Hawaii and Arizona as well as in California.

The various financing contacts di Suvero had developed for his real estate business gave him the opportunity to extend his management and funding practice into a succession of mining ventures. He became a principal in Standard Coal Co., developing mines in Tennessee and West Virginia. Subsequently, he established Sapphire Trading Company which reopened the Yogo Sapphire Mine in Montana and the Noble Metals Mine Operation in Southern California and Nevada. In 1999 he established Liberty Resources, LLC which currently controls two mining operations in Nevada and one in California.

In 1987, he drew the 50-feet tile mural Lady Liberty design that ended up on the facade of the building on 843 Los Angeles Street in the fashion district of Los Angeles.

During this entire period di Suvero continued with his writings.

He edited ¡Saludos!, the first bilingual collection of the poetry of New Mexico, all published by Pennywhistle Press which he established in 1986. Spring Again was awarded the Independent Publisher's Association Bronze Medal in 2007.

As a poetry activist he served as a Director of the National Poetry Association for four years establishing National Poetry Week in San Francisco in 1987 which now has become National Poetry Month sponsored by the Academy of American Poets among other sponsors, and is now celebrated across the United States. After moving to New Mexico in 1988, di Suvero became one of the founders of PEN New Mexico and of the New Mexico Book Association.

Di Suvero continued living a life in Poetry among his other interests. These include his ongoing work as Project Director for the National Institute for Change, for the American Immigrant Foundation and as the principal and sole Managing Member of Liberty Resources, LLC.

His latest publication, We Came To Santa Fe, is a charming collection of stories, poems and photographs by many who came to visit Santa Fe, New Mexico and stayed. It serves as a beautiful vehicle in explaining the charm, attraction and way of life to be found in what has become known as "The City Different."

== Bibliography ==
- Salt and the Heart’s Horizons Greenwood Press (1951)
- Sight Poems, Stolen Paper Editions (1962)
- San Francisco Poems (1987)/The Net (1987)
- Tesuque Poems 1993)
- Naked Heart (1997)
- Harvest Time (2001)
- Moving On (2007)
- Spring Again (2005)

== Anthologies ==
- ¡Saludos! (1995) (Co-Editor)
- We Came To Santa Fe (2009) (Editor)
- Sextet—Six Powerful American Voices—with introduction by Victor di Suvero

== The Blue Series ==
- Sublunary—by George H. Aigla with an introduction by Charles G. Bell
- Full Turn—by Sarah Blake with an introduction by Dorianne Laux
- Further Sightings—by Jerome Rothenberg with an introduction by Michael Palmer
- The Fields—by Richard Silberg with an introduction by Joyce Jenkins
- Who is Alice?—by Phillis Stowell with an introduction by Sandra Gilbert
- The Sum Complexities of the Humble Field—by Viola Weinberg with an introduction by Mary Mackey

== The Red Series ==
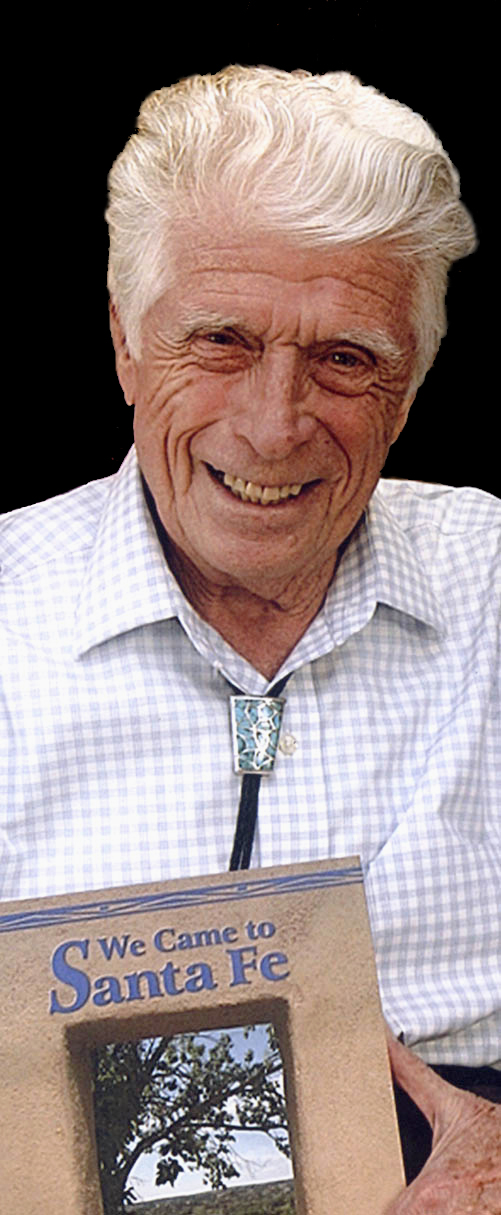
"We Came To Santa Fe

- Tesuque Poems—Victor di Suvero with an introduction by Pierre Delattre
- Hardwired for Love—Judith Hill—Out of Print
- Width of a Vibrato—by Edith Jenkins with an introduction by Robert Glück
- Portal—by Joyce Jenkins with an introduction by Carolyn Kizer
- Falling Short of Heaven—by Suzanne Lummis with an introduction by Austin Straus
- No Golden Gate for Us—by Frances X. Alarcón—Out of Print

== The Green Series ==
- Where You’ve Seen Her—by Grace Bauer with an introduction by Robin Becker
- Decoy’s Desire—by Kerry Shawn Keys with an introduction by Gerald Stern
- What Makes a Woman Beautiful—by Joan Logghe with an introduction by Jim Sagel
- Chaos Comics—by Jack Marshall with an introduction by Martin Marcus
- Between Landscapes—by Wai Lim Yip with an introduction Jerome Rothenberg
- Still the Sirens—by Dennis Brutus with an introduction by Lamont B. Steptoe

== Poetry books ==
- Voices from the Corner by Michael Sutin with an introduction by Victor di Suvero
- Blood Trails by Florence McGinn with an introduction by Victor di Suvero
- Bosque Redondo by Keith Wilson with an introduction by Rudolpho Anaya
- Hooplas by James Broughton
- Of Deserts and Rivers by Annamaria Napolitano with an introduction by John Freccero
- Poetry appearances in: New Mexico Poetry Renaissance, Nimrod, City Lights, and Live Poets Selections

== Editor ==
The Occident - A literary review of the University of California, Berkeley (1949)

== Plays and productions ==
- Icarus
- Indian Country
- Day of the Dead
- Varda
- Masque

== See also ==
- Mark di Suvero, his brother
