= Declarative =

Declarative may refer to:

- Declarative learning, acquiring information that one can speak about
- Declarative memory, one of two types of long term human memory
- Declarative programming, a computer programming paradigm
- Declarative sentence, a type of sentence that makes a statement
- Declarative mood, a grammatical verb form used in declarative sentences

== See also ==
- Declaration (disambiguation)
