= Lyman Kipp =

American sculptor and painter (1929–2014)

Lyman E. Kipp, Jr.
- Muscoot, by Kipp, at Calvin College in Grand Rapids, Michigan, USA
- Born: Lyman Emmet Kipp, Jr. December 24, 1929; Dobbs Ferry, New York
- Died: March 30, 2014 (aged 84); Bonita Springs, Florida
- Known for: Sculpture, painting

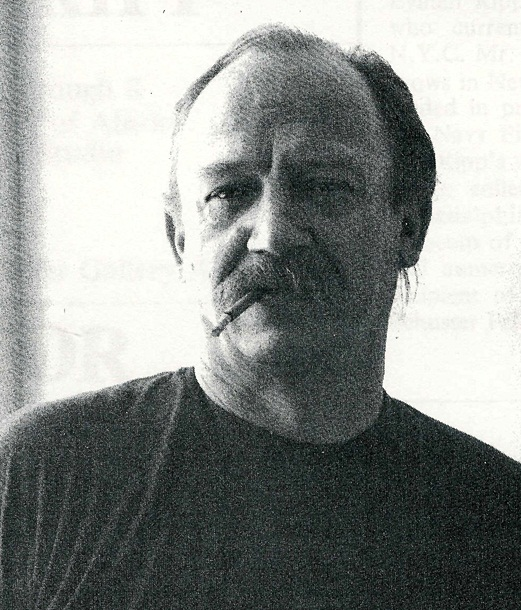
Lyman Kipp

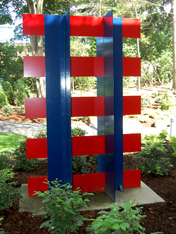
Long Distance, by Kipp, at Calvin College in Grand Rapids, MI, USA

Salute to Knowledge, by Kipp, at Grosse Pointe Public Library in Grosse Pointe, MI, USA

Lyman Emmet Kipp, Jr. (December 24, 1929 – March 30, 2014) was a sculptor and painter who created pieces that are composed of strong vertical and horizontal objects and were often painted in bold primary colors recalling arrangements by De Stijl Constructivists. Kipp is an important figure in the development of the Primary Structure style which came to prominence in the mid-1960s.

Kipp's early work in the 1950s focused on geometric, plaster reliefs and cast bronzes (see No. 1 - 1959 or Directional I). He moved on to large, geometric, welded pieces composed of post and beam elements emphasizing the vertical during the 1960s (see Andy's Cart Blanche, Muscoot or Hudson Bay). Finding it difficult to transport large, heavy, welded pieces, he turned to angled sections and sheets of steel and aluminum that could be bolted together on site. Typically the pieces were painted with bright colors and the thin edges were often defined with bright, complementary colors (see Long Distance, Chicksaw or Kobi). In the late 1970s, Kipp's steel sheets began to move into the air on thin legs (see Lockport 1977, Salute to Knowledge or Yoakum Jack).

Kipp was a founding member of ConStruct, the artist-owned gallery that promoted and organized large-scale sculpture exhibitions throughout the United States. Other founding members include Mark di Suvero, Kenneth Snelson, John Raymond Henry and Charles Ginnever.

Kipp's health deteriorated and he died peacefully on March 30, 2014. His last known works were in 2011.

== Education/Teaching/Grants ==
1950 - 1952 Pratt Institute, Brooklyn, NY
1952 - 1954 Cranbrook Academy of Art, Michigan

1960 - 1963 Bennington College, Vermont
1962 - 1963 Pratt Institute, Brooklyn, NY
1963 - 1968 Hunter College, NYC
1966 Dartmouth College, NH (Visiting Artist)
1968 - 1975 Lehman College, NYC (Chairman - 1968 - 1974)
1975 - 1978 Hunter College, NYC (Chairman)
1978 - 1985 Hunter College, NYC
1985 Hunter College, NYC (Professor Emeritus)

1966 Guggenheim Fellowship
1966 Fulbright Grant
1967 Summer Research Grant, City University of New York
1970 City University Faculty Research Grant
1975 City University Faculty Research Grant
1977 Art Park, Lewiston, NY
1980 Hand Hollow Foundation, New York
1982 Schuster Grant

== Monumental sculptures and public works ==
=== United States ===
Alabama

- Cherokee, 1977, University of Alabama, Huntsville

Arizona

- Hudson Bay, 1968, Museum of Art, University of Arizona, Tucson

California

- Trap II, 1965, University Art Museum, University of California, Berkeley
- Chickasaw, 1977, California State University, San Bernardino
- Highline, 1976, Federal Building & Post Office, Van Nuys

Colorado

- Alto, 1984, Hoffman Heights Library, Aurora
- Red Wing, 1974, Aurora Corporate Plaza, Aurora

District of Columbia

- Alternate Design for Highline, 1975, Smithsonian American Art Museum, Washington
- Salamanca, 1969, Smithsonian American Art Museum, Washington

Florida

- Dollbaby, 1991, Pinewood Park, Largo
- Levenworth, 1978, Pinewood Park, Largo
- Blackjack, Miami Cancer Institute, Baptist Health, Miami
- D, Greynolds Park, North Miami Beach
- Tonawanda, 1977, Florida Coastal Professional Center, Naples
- Kenosha, 1984, von Liebig Art Center, Naples
- Untitled (blue/red), 1984, von Liebig Art Center, Naples
- Untitled (black/red), 1984, von Liebig Art Center, Naples
- E, 1979, Vero Beach Museum of Art, Vero Beach

Indiana

- Range, 1974, Fort Wayne Museum of Art, Fort Wayne

Massachusetts

- Auro, 1965, List Visual Arts Center, Massachusetts Institute of Technology, Cambridge

Michigan

- No. 1-1959, 1959, Museum of Art, University of Michigan, Ann Arbor
- Oshkosh, 1978, Grand Rapids Art Museum, Grand Rapids
- Bullshoals, 1978, Grand Rapids Art Museum, Grand Rapids
- Kobi, 1982, Grand Rapids Art Museum, Grand Rapids
- Study for Zephyr, 1973, Grand Rapids Art Museum, Grand Rapids
- Salute to Knowledge, 1981, Grosse Pointe Public Library, Grosse Pointe Farms
- Muscoot, 1979, Calvin College Campus, Grand Rapids
- Long Distance, 1979, Calvin College Campus, Grand Rapids

Nebraska

- Ulysses, 1972, Sheldon Museum of Art, University of Nebraska–Lincoln, Lincoln

New Hampshire

- Bartar, 1968, Hood Museum of Art, Dartmouth College, Hanover
- Median II, 1963, Hood Museum of Art, Dartmouth College, Hanover

New York

- Wild Rice, 1967, The Governor Nelson A. Rockefeller Empire State Plaza Art Collection, west plaza, Albany
- Directional I, 1962, Albright-Knox Art Gallery, Buffalo
- Flat Rate II, 1969, Albright-Knox Art Gallery, Buffalo
- Trianon, 1963, Whitney Museum of American Art, NYC
- Lockport 1977, 1977, Storm King Art Center, Mountainville
- Untitled, Storm King Art Center, Mountainville
- Placid, 1978, Lake Placid Center for the Arts, Lake Placid

New Jersey

- Yoakum Jack, 1977, William Paterson University, Wayne

Pennsylvania

- Music Box, 1956, Philadelphia Museum of Art, Philadelphia
- Manly, 1980, Hartwood Acres Park, Pittsburgh
- Wink, 1980, Penn State University, University Park

Tennessee

- Dragon Fly, 1995, Sculpture Fields of Montague Park, Chattanooga
- Hugo, 1980, Sculpture Fields of Montague Park, Chattanooga

Wisconsin

- Bullfinch, 1968, Lynden Sculpture Garden, Milwaukee
- Lodgepole, 1968, Lynden Sculpture Garden, Milwaukee
