= John McComb Jr. =

American architect (1763–1853)

- Born: October 17, 1763. New York City, U.S.
- Died: May 25, 1853 (aged 89); New York City, U.S.
- Resting place: Green-Wood Cemetery

John McComb Jr. (October 17, 1763 – May 25, 1853) was an American architect who designed many landmarks in the 18th and 19th centuries. Between 1790 and 1825, McComb was New York City's leading architect.

== Early life and education ==
McComb Jr. was born on October 17, 1763, in New York City and was of Scottish ancestry. In 1783, McComb began working with his father, John McComb Sr., a well known architect and surveyor. In 1790, he began working independently and John Jay spoke highly of his work to Alexander Hamilton. McComb would later design Hamilton's home, the Grange. In general, McComb worked in the Federal style.

McComb died in 1853, and is interred at Green-Wood Cemetery in Brooklyn, New York.

== Work ==
- Old Cape Henry Light (1792), first lighthouse totally authorized by the federal government.
- Montauk Point Lighthouse (1796)
- Station Eatons Neck Lighthouse (1798)
- Gracie Mansion (1799)
- St. Mark's Church in-the-Bowery (1799)
- Hamilton Grange (1802)
- New York City Hall (1803)
- St. John's Chapel (New York City) (1803, demolished 1918)
- Old Queens building at Rutgers University (1808)
- Castle Clinton (1808)
- Washington Hall (1809)
- Alexander Hall, Princeton Theological Seminary (1815)

== Gallery ==
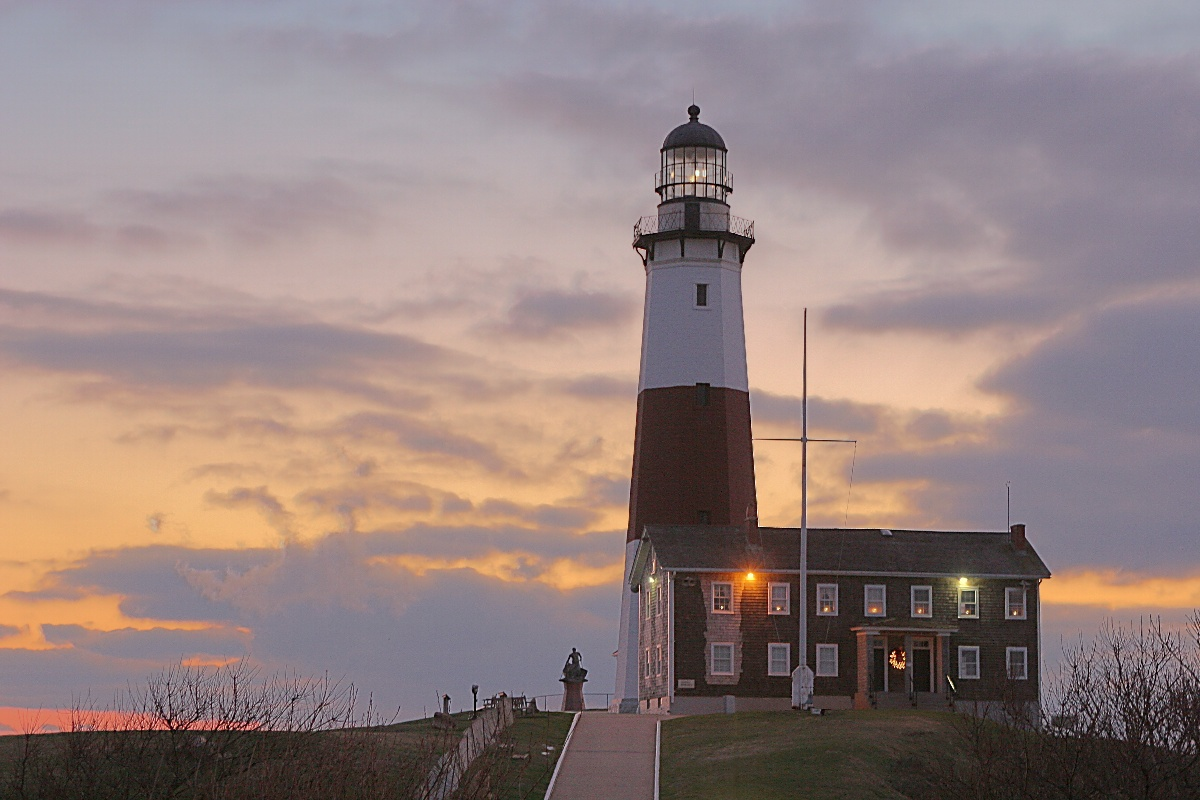
Montauk Point Lighthouse (1796)

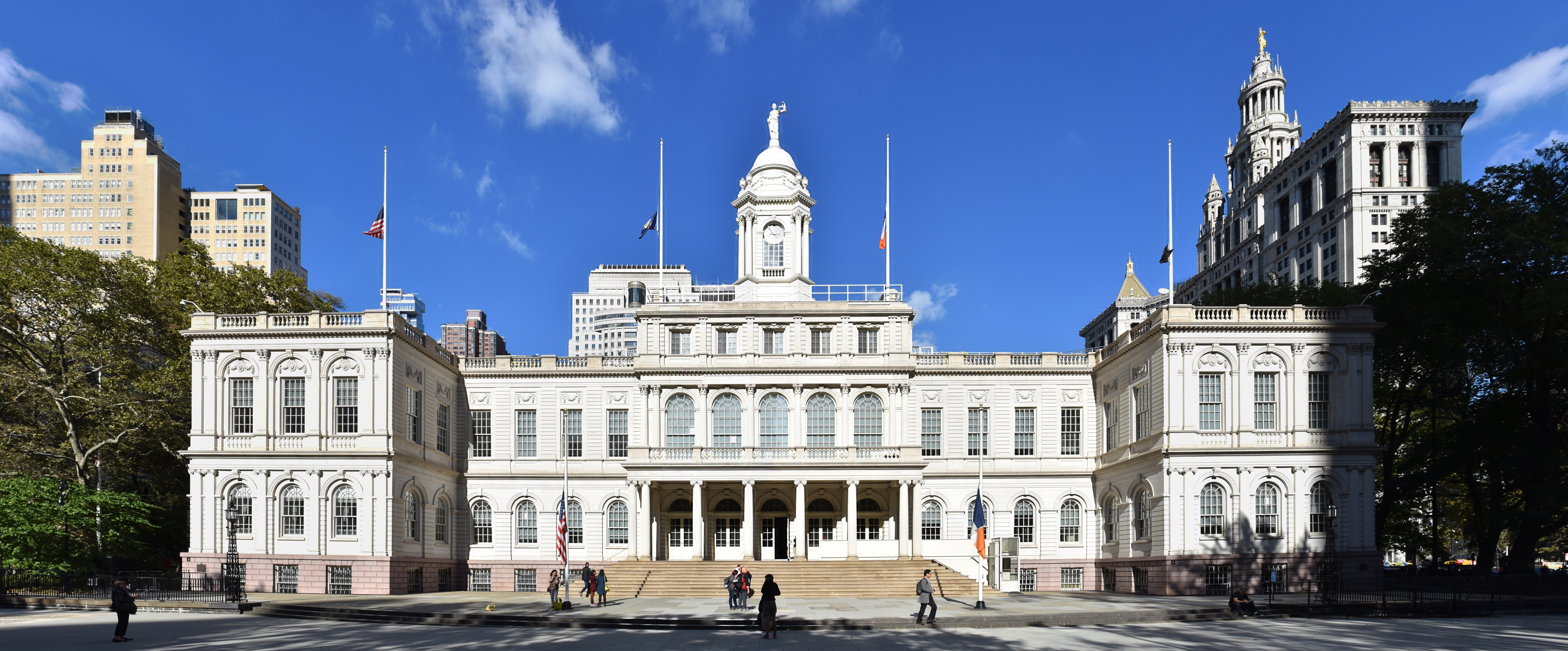
New York City Hall (1803)

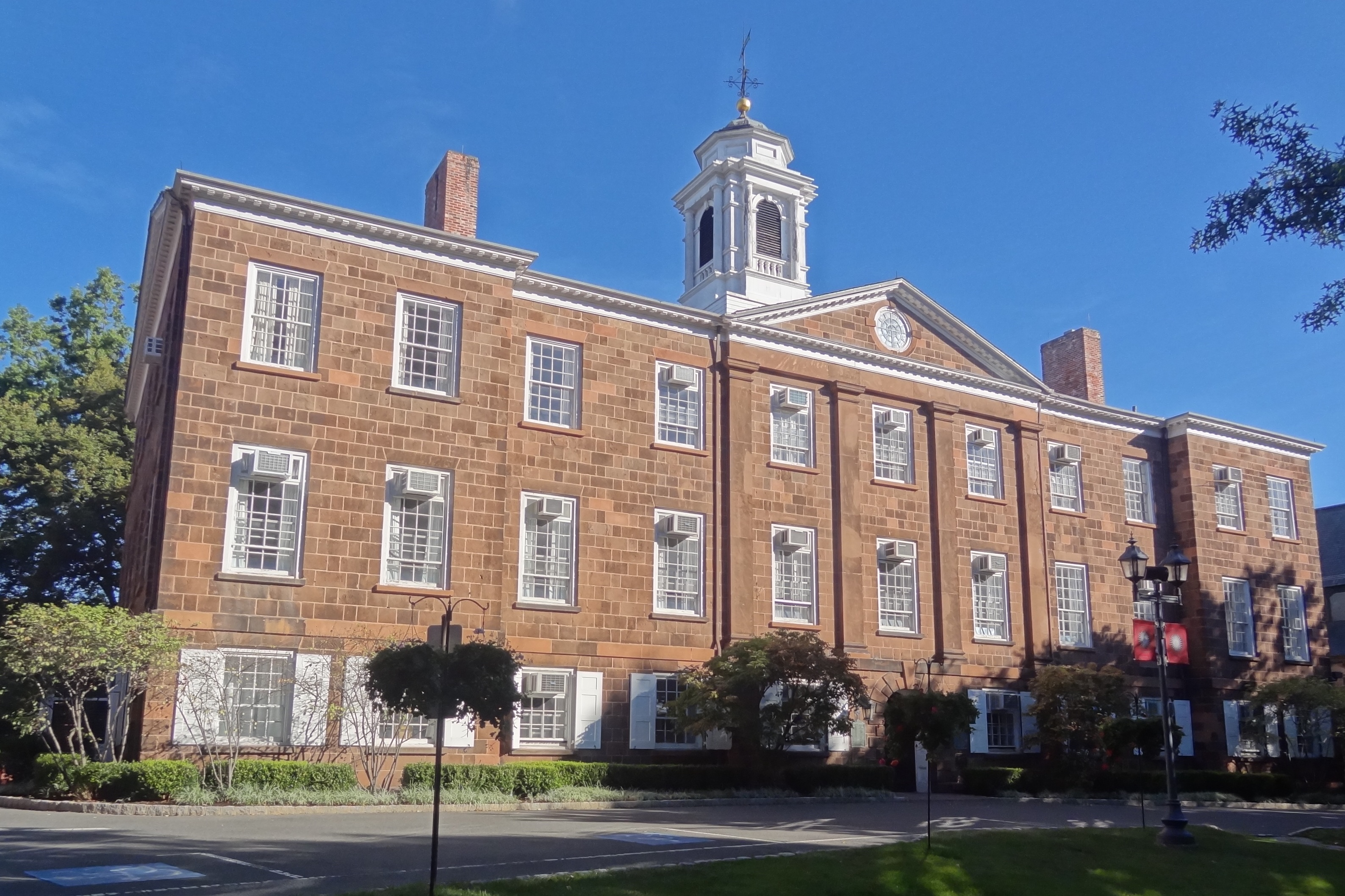
Old Queens at Rutgers University (1808)

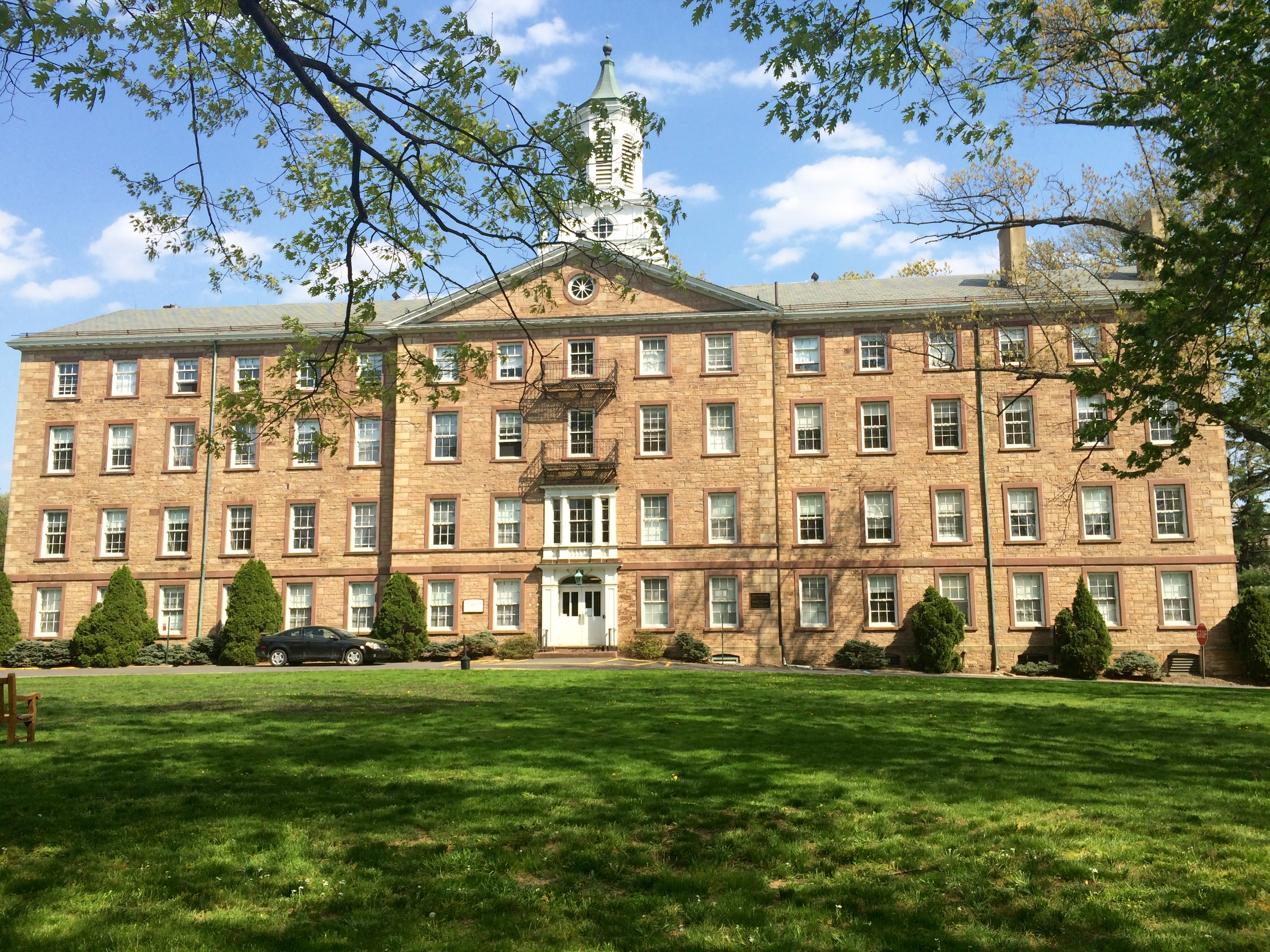
Alexander Hall, Princeton Theological Seminary (1815)
