= Recycled Materials Association =

Recycled Materials Association (ReMA)
- ReMA's logo
- Formation: 1987
- Type: 501(c)(6), Corporation
- Tax ID no.: 31-1205596
- Headquarters: Washington, DC
- President: Robin Wiener
- Board of directors: Colin Kelly (Chair) Andy Golding (Chair Elect) Neil Byce (Vice-Chair) Sean Daoud (Secretary/Treasurer)
- Website: www.recycledmaterials.org

The Recycled Materials Association (ReMA) is a United States–based private, non-profit trade association representing more than 1,600 private and public for-profit companies—ranging from small, family-owned businesses to multi-national corporations—operating at more than 6,000 facilities in the United States and 40 countries worldwide. Its membership is made up of manufacturers and processors, brokers and industrial consumers of recyclable commodities, including ferrous and nonferrous metals, paper, electronics, rubber, plastics, glass and textiles. ReMA's associate members include equipment and service providers to the recycling industry. Manufacturers and sellers of equipment and services—such as shredders, balers, cranes, cargo transporters, computer systems and more—also promote the recycling industry through their membership in ReMA.

ReMA changed its name from the 'Institute of Scrap Recycling Industries' to the 'Recycled Materials Association' during Summer 2024. This rebrand was made in an effort to "better reflect the innovations and motivations of today’s recycling industry".

ReMA advocates for safety and responsibility in many different areas of the recycling industry—metals theft, electronics recycling, occupational safety and regulatory compliance of its members. The organization also publishes periodic research on the recycling industry.

The trade organization operates many regional chapters, policy and networking events and an annual convention and exposition, the largest gathering of recyclers in the world each year.

With a motto of the “Voice of the Recycling Industry,” ReMA promotes public awareness of the value and importance of recycling to the production of the world’s goods and services, along with the positive environmental benefits derived from recycling. As part of this effort, ReMA advocates on behalf of the industry before the U.S. Congress, federal and state agencies, state governments and international bodies to help ensure the free and fair trade of recyclable commodities globally.

== Metals theft ==
ReMA operates a free web-based alert system seeking to connect law enforcement communities and scrap yard operators in the investigation and prevention of materials theft. This service, Scrap Theft Alert, is online at www.scraptheftalert.com. Law enforcement officials can post information about stolen materials, or materials that have been stolen by thieves that could be sold for scrap. The reports are turned into alerts that are then broadcast over the Internet to all member scrap yards within a 200-mile radius.

== Electronics recycling ==
Electronics recycling is one of the most dynamic and fastest growing segments of the recycling industry and generated an estimated revenue of more than $5.2 billion to the U.S. economy in 2010, employed more than 30,000 full-time employees in the private sector and when non-profit organizations are included, more than 45,000 people; and collected and processed domestically more than 3.5 million of used and end-of-life electronics. These figures are up, ReMA reports, from up from less than $1 billion in economic impact, 6,000 full-time employees and processing output 600,000 short tons (536,000 long tons; 544,000 t) in 2002.

ReMA, along with the U.S. Environmental Protection Agency, industry representatives and other stakeholders, helped develop the Responsible Recycling certification standard for Electronics Recyclers, (R2), an environmental safety standard that seeks to implement environmental, health and safety regulations for electronics recyclers in the absence of regulation in the U.S.

Companies certified to the standard agree to meet and maintain specific health and safety requirements in the process of dismantling and recycling electronics.

ReMA also developed the RIOS standard to help improve the recycling industry overall and is available to any recycler, not just electronics recyclers.

== Recycling industry jobs ==
ReMA produces periodic reports detailing information on the state of the U.S. recycling industry. Several recent studies show that the U.S. recycling industry creates and supports hundreds of thousands jobs in the United States and generates billions in revenue for federal, state and local governments across the country.

Currently, the organization estimates 531,500 jobs are supported by the recycling industry in the U.S., and that the industry contributes $110 billion in annual economic benefit.

The organization also tracks jobs created by export of recyclable material to overseas markets, where recyclable plastics, paper and metal are refined and processed before re-entering the manufacturing stream. According to a study conducted by John Dunham and Associates for ReMA, U.S. recyclable exports directly and indirectly support some 160,000 U.S. jobs while having generated an economic impact of $33.11 billion in 2019, helping the U.S. balance of trade.
