= Declaration (sculpture) =

Sculpture by Mark di Suvero

- The sculpture in 2022
- Artist: Mark di Suvero
- Location: Los Angeles, California, U.S.; 33°59′11″N 118°28′28″W

Declaration is a sculpture by Mark di Suvero, installed in Venice, Los Angeles, in the U.S. state of California.
