= USS Shoshone =

USS Shoshone or USNS Shoshone has been the name of more than one United States Navy ship:

- USS Shoshone (ID-1760), a troop transport in commission in 1919.
- USS Shoshone (AKA-65), an attack cargo ship in commission from 1944 to 1946
- USNS Shoshone (T-AO-151), an oiler in service in the Military Sea Transportation Service and Military Sealift Command from 1957 until the probably the mid-1980s, reclassified as a "transport oiler" and designated "T-AOT-151" during her career
