= Shoshone (sculpture) =

Sculpture by Mark di Suvero in Los Angeles, California, U.S.

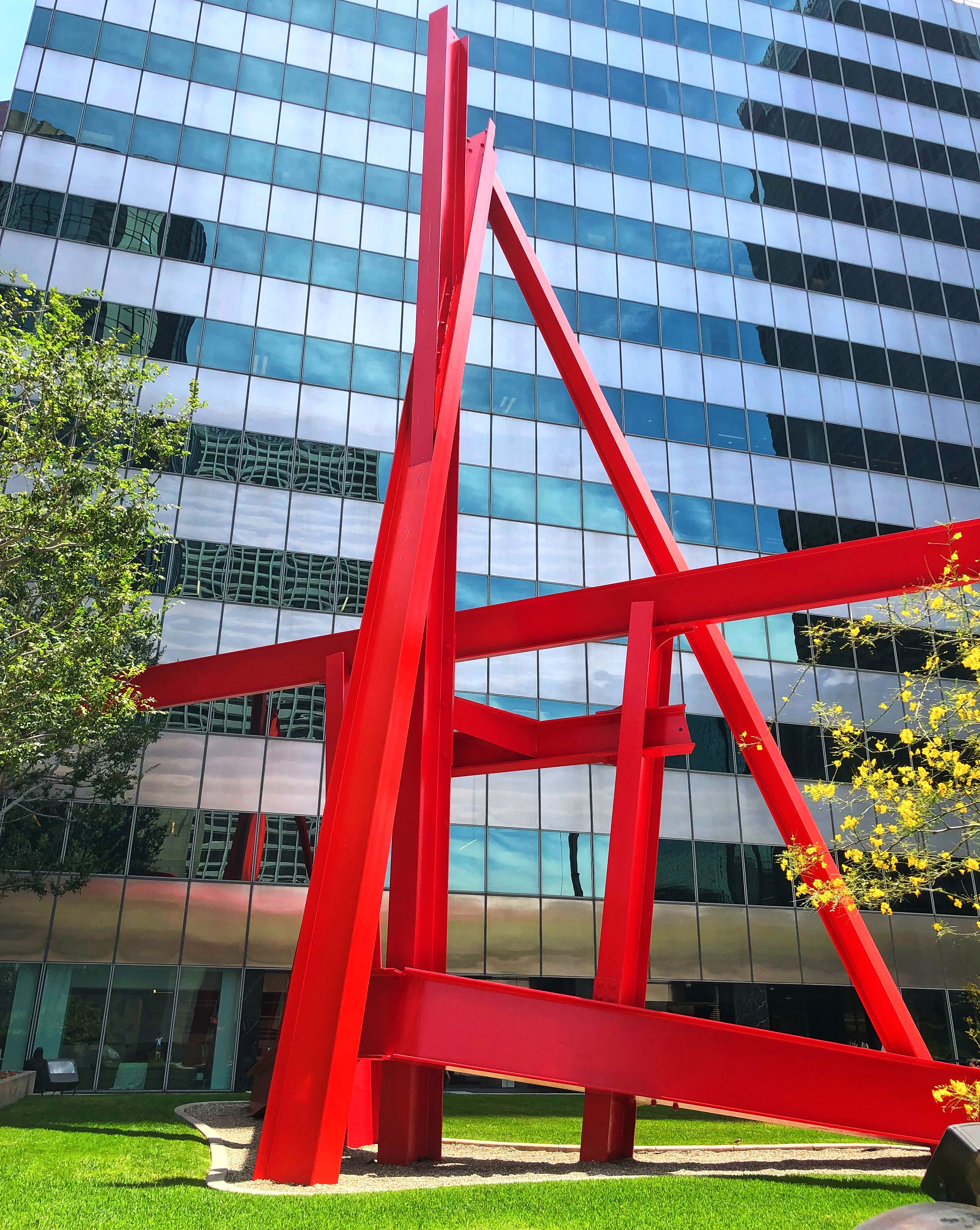
- The sculpture in 2019
- Artist: Mark di Suvero
- Location: Los Angeles, California, U.S.
- 34°3′6.9″N 118°15′19.4″W

Shoshone is a 1981–1982 steel sculpture by Mark di Suvero, installed in Bunker Hill, Los Angeles, in the U.S. state of California.
