= Mark di Suvero =

American sculptor (born 1933)

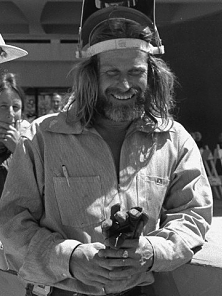
- Di Suvero in 1978
- Born: Marco Polo di Suvero; September 18, 1933 (age 93); Shanghai, China
- Education: University of California, Santa Barbara (attended); University of California, Berkeley (B.A.)
- Known for: Sculpture
- Movement: Abstract expressionism
- Spouses: Maria Teresa Capparotta (m. c. 1972; div.); Kate D. Levin (m. 1993; div.); Heidi Holst (m. 2023)
- Awards: Heinz Award (2005); National Medal of Arts (2010); American Academy of Arts and Letters Gold Medal (2013)
- Website: spacetimecc.com

Marco Polo di Suvero (born September 18, 1933), better known as Mark di Suvero, is an abstract expressionist sculptor and 2010 National Medal of Arts recipient.

== Early life and education ==
Di Suvero was born in Shanghai, China, to Italian parents, Matilde Millo di Suvero and Vittorio di Suvero (later known as Victor E.) He was one of four children, the eldest being Victor di Suvero. His father was a U.S. Navy attaché for the Italian government, and the family lived in Shanghai until his father was relocated to Tientsin shortly after the birth of the family's last son in 1936.

After the outbreak of World War II, the di Suvero family learned they were to be sent to a concentration camp. His father was half-Jewish, and both of his parents were strongly anti-Fascist politically. They immigrated to San Francisco in February 1941 aboard the S.S. President Cleveland thanks to the help of Italian diplomat Ferruccio Stefenelli.

Di Suvero attended City College of San Francisco from 1953 to 1954, and then the University of California, Santa Barbara from 1954 to 1955. He began creating sculptures while attending the University of California, Santa Barbara after learning that he was unable to make an original contribution as part of his philosophy major. He transferred to the University of California, Berkeley and graduated with a B.A. in philosophy in 1957.

== Career ==
After graduating from college, di Suvero moved to New York City in 1957 to begin a career as a sculptor. He worked part-time in construction and began incorporating wood and metal from demolition sites into his work.

Di Suvero gained recognition among art critics with his first solo exhibit at the Green Gallery in Manhattan in the fall of 1960. The editor of Arts Magazine wrote, "From now on nothing will be the same. One felt this at di Suvero's show. Here was a body of work at once so ambitious and intelligent, so raw and clean, so noble and accessible, that it must permanently alter our standards of artistic effort."

On March 26, 1960, while working at a construction site, he was involved in a near-fatal elevator accident, resulting in a broken back and severe spinal injuries. Treating physicians initially believed he would be unable to walk again. While in rehabilitation, however, he learned to work with an arc welder, which he used in later pieces. His recovery took four years. By 1965, he was able to walk without assistance. He is one of the 16 artists featured in Chronicles of Courage: Very Special Artists, a book that featured the accident and the subsequent effect it had on his health.

Di Suvero was a founding member of the Park Place Gallery in 1963 with Forrest Myers, Leo Valledor, Peter Forakis, and others. The gallery closed in July 1967.

Di Suvero bought and repaired a broken crane after receiving a National Endowment for the Arts grant, and used it to build Are Years What? (For Marianne Moore) (1967). This was the first sculpture to be built using a crane in the United States.

Di Suvero protested the Vietnam War, and was arrested twice. He left the United States in 1971. During his four-year self-exile, he exhibited his works in the Netherlands and Germany, taught at the Università Internazionale dell'Arte, and lived in Chalon-sur-Saône, France where he maintained one of his studios on a barge until 1989. His French barge, Rêve de signes, has since been turned into La Vie des Formes, an atelier for emerging artists, which has been moored at Montceau-les-Mines since 2009.

In 1975, his sculptures were exhibited in the Tuileries Garden in Paris, the first living artist to hold an exhibition there. He later returned to the United States and opened a studio in Petaluma, California in 1975. While the Petaluma studio is still active, di Suvero moved to New York City and opened a studio there.

In 1976, the Whitney Museum of American Art in Manhattan housed a retrospective exhibition of di Suvero's smaller structures, while the city of New York exhibited some of his larger sculptures all around town. It was the first citywide exhibition in the United States. His 1966 sculpture, Praise for Elohim Adonai, was erected in front of the Seagram Building. In January 2024, the work was permanently installed adjacent to David Chipperfield's East Building for the Saint Louis Art Museum.

He founded the Athena Foundation in 1977 and Socrates Sculpture Park in 1986, both of which function to assist artists. In 2019, his tallest piece, E=MC 2, was moved from France to the Storm King Art Center in upstate New York.

== Personal life ==
Di Suvero lives in California with his wife Heidi Holst. He was previously married to Kate D. Levin, with whom he has a child. Levin, a former City College of New York teacher, served as Commissioner of the New York City Department of Cultural Affairs from 2002 to 2013, and has worked in the Ed Koch and Michael Bloomberg administrations. Di Suvero was previously married to architect Maria Teresa Caparrotta, whom he met while living in Italy, but later divorced.

Di Suvero broke his back in 1960 while working a construction job in New York, and was paralyzed from the hips down. In 2018, he burned himself while welding and the leg had to be removed.

== Art ==
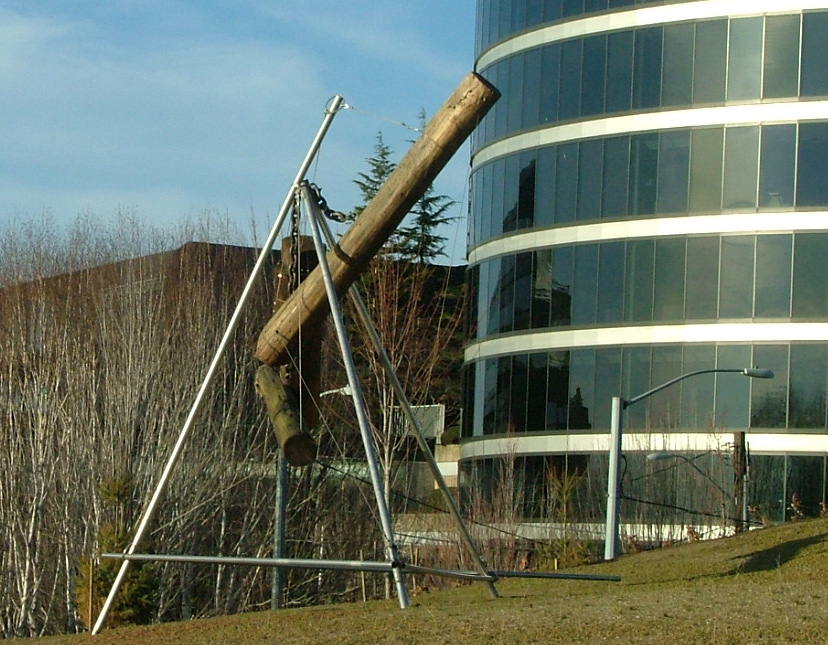
Bunyon's Chess at Olympic Sculpture Park in Seattle

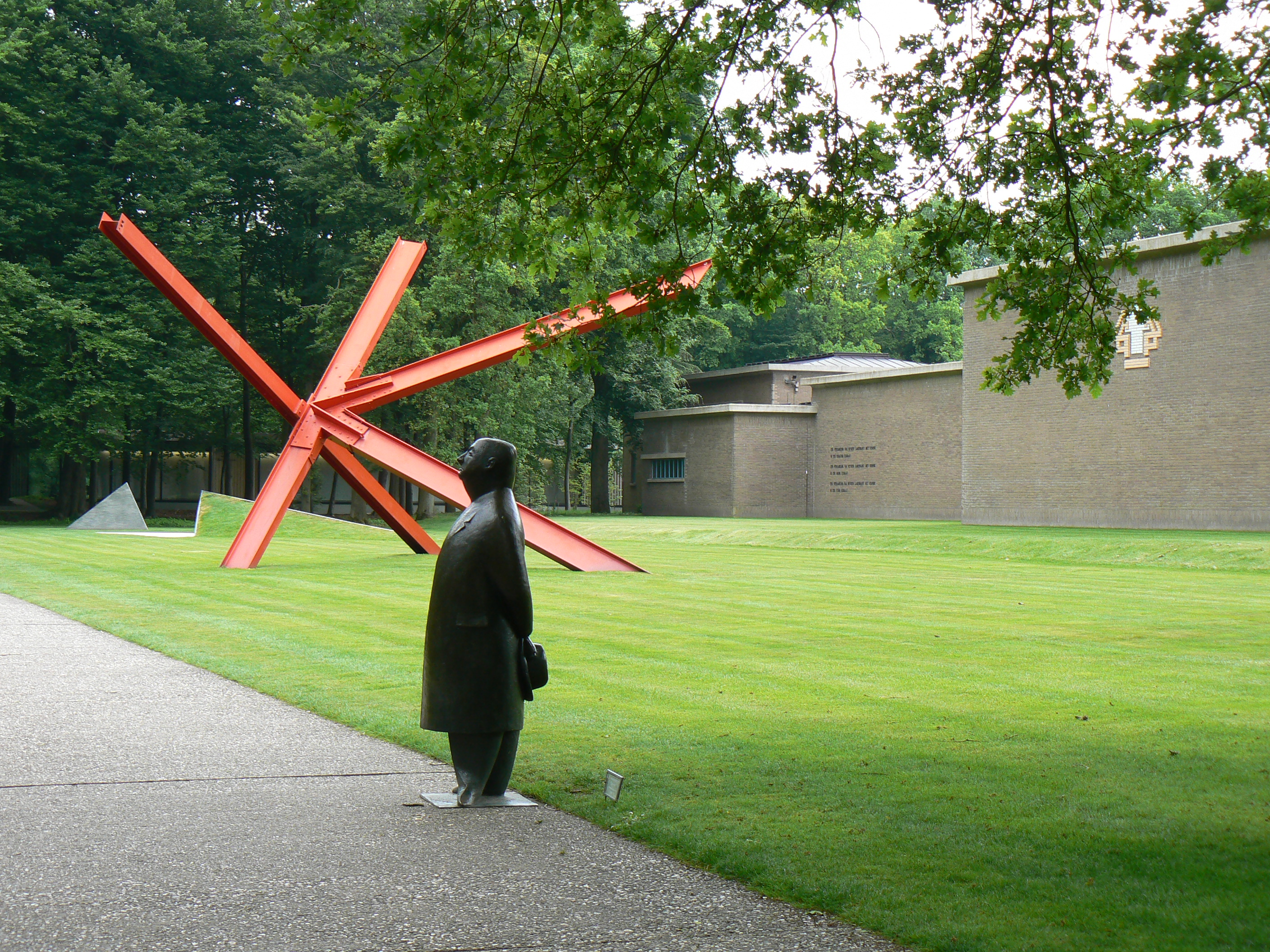
Entrance to the Kröller-Müller Museum and sculpture park in Otterlo in the Netherlands; in the background is the red K-piece by di Suvero.

His early works were large outdoor pieces that incorporated wooden timbers from demolition buildings, tires, scrap metal, and structural steel. This exploration has transformed over time into a focus on H-beams and heavy steel plates. Many of the pieces contain sections that are allowed to swing and rotate giving the overall forms a considerable degree of motion. He prides himself on his hands-on approach to the fabrication and installation of his work. Di Suvero pioneered the use of a crane as a sculptor's working tool.

His style is associated with the abstract expressionism movement but directly evokes the spirit of the Russian post-revolution constructivism. Constructivism is strongly associated with concepts of a utopian socialist reconstruction but came crashing down when the Stalin and Hitler empires failed. Di Suvero is the first artist post-war to revive the constructivist movement. The sculptures can be touched, and they are resistant enough to be climbed on.

Some of his work includes:

- Pre-Columbian (1964), acquired by the Fine Arts Museums of San Francisco in 2000
- Bunyon's Chess (1965) at Olympic Sculpture Park in Seattle
- Poland (1966) at Lynden Sculpture Garden in Milwaukee
- No Shoes (1967) at Corktown Common in Toronto (originally installed in High Park)
- Flower Power (1967) at the head of Telegram Mews, CityPlace, Toronto (originally installed in High Park)
- Are Years What? (for Marianne Moore) (1967) at Hirshhorn Museum and Sculpture Garden in Washington, D.C.
- Snowplow (1968) at the Indianapolis Museum of Art in Indianapolis
- Victor's Lament (1969–1970), Muhlenberg College, Pennsylvania
- The Lovers (1971–1973) at Lynden Sculpture Garden in Milwaukee
- For Handel (1975), Western Washington University, Bellingham, Washington
- Bygones (1976), at the Menil Collection in Houston
- Motu Viget (1977), sited adjacent to the Gerald R. Ford Federal Building in Grand Rapids, Michigan
- Inner Search (1980) in Minneapolis
- The Calling (1981–1982) at O'Donnell Park in Milwaukee
- Shoshone (1982), public art sculpture in the Bunker Hill section of Los Angeles
- Iroquois (1983) on the Benjamin Franklin Parkway in Philadelphia
- Old Glory (1986)
- Aurora (1992-1993), purchased by the National Gallery of Art in Washington, D.C. from Gagosian Gallery in 1996
- E=MC 2 (1992–1993), moved from France to the Storm King Art Center in upstate New York in 2019, his largest piece so far.
- Scarlatti (1994–2000), Frederik Meijer Gardens & Sculpture Park in Grand Rapids, Michigan
- Galileo (1996), acquired by the Daimler Art Collection in 1998
- Joie de Vivre (1998) in Zuccotti Park in Manhattan
- Pax Jerusalemme (1998–1999) at the Legion of Honor in San Francisco
- The Sieve of Eratosthenes (1999) at Stanford University in Stanford, California
- Declaration (2001), a public art sculpture in Venice Beach in Los Angeles
- Ben Webster (2001), Frederik Meijer Gardens & Sculpture Park in Grand Rapids, Michigan
- Orion (2006) at the University of Michigan Museum of Art at the University of Michigan in Ann Arbor, Michigan
- Clock Knot (2007) on the campus of the University of Texas at Austin in Austin, Texas
- Paintbrush (2009) on the campus of the Pratt Institute in Brooklyn
- Sooner or Later (2022) outside of the Brooklyn Museum

Di Suvero's sculptures and career were the subjects of the 1977 film, North Star: Mark di Suvero. The film was produced by François De Menil and by art historian Barbara Rose, and it featured music composed by Philip Glass. The film was released as a DVD in 2012.

In May 2013, some of his most famous sculptures were exhibited in Crissy Field in San Francisco.

In 2023, di Suvero had a major exhibition at Nasher Sculpture Center in Dallas, Texas.

== Critics ==
Some critics deny the novelty of di Suvero's art, arguing he just inflated an established concept to greater dimensions. In 1975, William Rubin argued he merely vulgarized the style of abstract expressionism set forth by Willem de Kooning and Franz Kline. When Pax Jerusalemme was installed in a prominent spot in front of the Legion of Honor in 2000, Kenneth Baker in the San Francisco Chronicle dismissed it as "mediocre." But remarking on the installation of the artist's colossal E=MC 2 at the Storm King Art Center, Jason Farago in the New York Times wrote that di Suvero "understands better than almost any artist the distinction between size and scale—and this serene work, breathing easy in Storm King's largest field, feels as approachable as a family member."

== Awards and honors ==
- 2000: International Sculpture Center's Lifetime Achievement in Contemporary Sculpture Award
- 2005: Winner in the Arts and Humanities category at the 11th Annual Heinz Awards, which came with a $250,000 prize.
- 2010:
  - Medal of the Archives of American Art by the Smithsonian Institution
  - Winner of the National Medal of Arts, presented on March 2, 2011, by President Barack Obama.
- 2013: American Academy of Arts and Letters Gold Medal
- 2019: Honorary Doctor of Fine Arts, University of Michigan.

== See also ==
- Park Place Gallery
- John Raymond Henry
- Abstract expressionism
