= John Raymond Henry =

American sculptor (1943–2022)

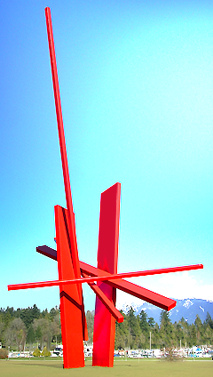
Jaguar, by Henry, at Devonian Park for the Vancouver Sculpture Biennale

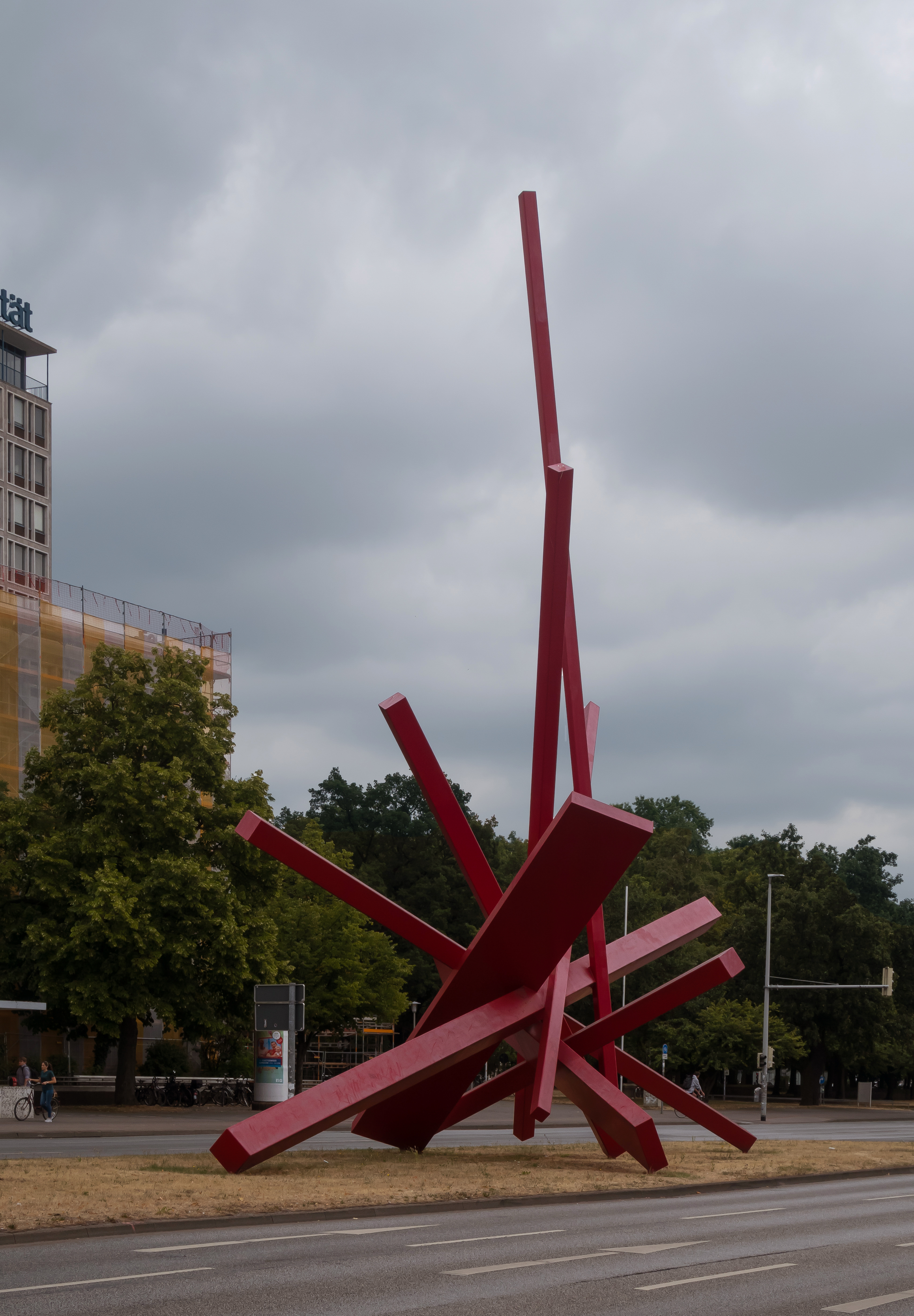
Symphony in Red, Hannover (Germany)

John Raymond Henry (August 11, 1943 – November 1, 2022) was an American sculptor. Henry's sculpture has been described as huge welded steel drawings.

== Education and distinctions ==
Henry was born in Lexington, Kentucky, in 1943. He received his BFA from School of the Art Institute of Chicago in 1969. From 1978 to 1980, he was President and Chairman of ConStruct. Henry also studied at the Illinois Institute of Technology, the University of Chicago, and Northwestern University. In 1996, the University of Kentucky awarded him the Honorary Doctor of Arts. From 2001 to 2002, he was Chairman of the International Sculpture Center. In 2016, he founded Sculpture Fields at Montague Park in Chattanooga, Tennessee. Henry died at home on November 1, 2022, in Brooksville, Florida.

== Recognition ==
- 2003 Kentucky Governor's National Award.
- 2004 Mayor's Award of Distinction in the Arts in City of Chattanooga.

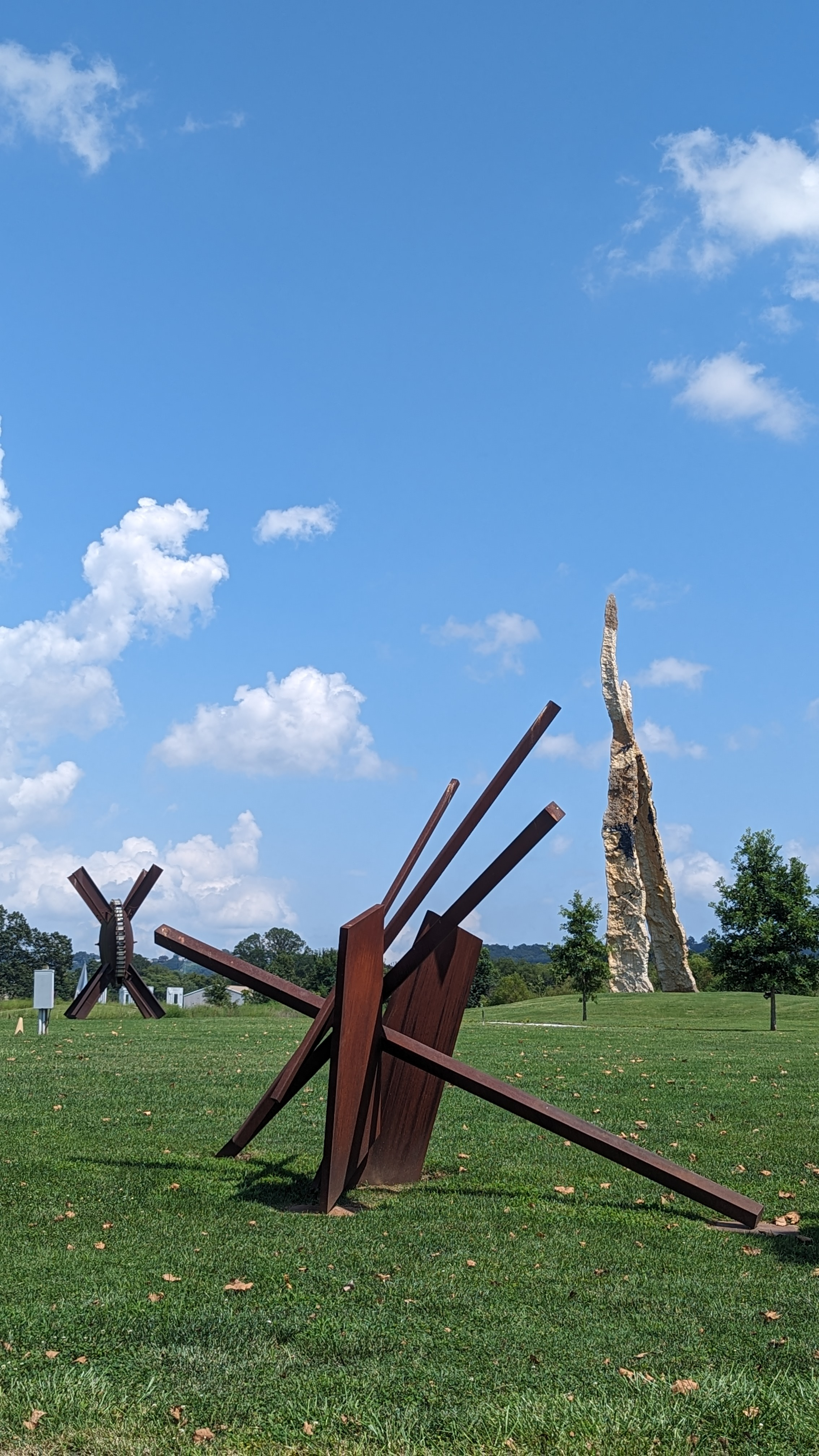
John Henry sculpture installed at Sculpture Fields at Montague Park in Chattanooga, Tennessee, which he founded in 2016.
