= Documenta 6 =

1977 art exhibition in Kassel, West Germany

documenta 6 was the sixth edition of documenta, a quinquennial contemporary art exhibition. It was held between 24 June and 2 October 1977 in Kassel, West Germany. The artistic director was Manfred Schneckenburger. The title of the exhibition was: Internationale Ausstellung – international exhibition.

== Participants ==
A
Berenice Abbott	Hermann Albert	Carl Andre	Ben d'Armagnac	Christian Ludwig Attersee
Vito Acconci	Pierre Alechinsky	Theo Angelopoulos	Arman	Bernard Aubertin
Valerio Adami	Gerhard Altenbourg	Ottomar Anschütz	Fernando Arrabal	Joannis Avramidis
Robert Adamson	Robert Altman	Horst Antes	Eduardo Arroyo	Alice Aycock
Peter Ackermann	Anatol	Ant Farm	Art & Language	Mac Adams
Billy Adler	Gisela Andersch	Shusaku Arakawa	David Askevold	Carlo Alfano
Chantal Akerman	Laurie Anderson	Diane Arbus	Eugène Atget	Stephen Antonakos
Thom Andersen
B
Francis Bacon	Monika Baumgartl	Joseph Beuys	Fernando Botero
Michael Badura	Hippolyte Bayard	Michael von Biel	Margaret Bourke-White	Günter Brus
Édouard Baldus	Thomas Bayrle	Werner Bischof	Mathew B. Brady	Anatol Brusilovsky
Balthus	Cecil Beaton	Louis-Auguste Bisson & Auguste-Rosalie Bisson	Brassaï	Wojciech Bruszewski
Joachim Bandau	Bernd and Hilla Becher	Irma Blank	George Brecht	Luis Buñuel
Jared Bark	Stephen Beck	Karl Blossfeldt	KP Brehmer	Chris Burden
Robert Barry	Bill Beckley	Anna and Bernhard Blume	George Hendrik Breitner	Daniel Buren
Jennifer Bartlett	E. J. Bellocq	Mel Bochner	Heinz Breloh	Stuart Brisley FIU
Scott Burton	Gianfranco Baruchello	James Benning	Peter Bogdanovich	Georg Baselitz
Michael Buthe	Giorgio Battistella	Franz Bernhard	Claus Böhmler	James Lee Byars
Gerd Baukhage	Jean-Marie Bertholin	Blythe Bohnen	Jürgen Brodwolf
Horst H. Baumann	Nuccio Bertone	Karl Bohrmann	Marcel Broodthaers
Bodo Baumgarten	Jean-Louis Bertucelli	Christian Boltanski	Stanley Brouwn
C
Enzo Cacciola	Robert Capa	Barbara Chase-Riboud	Pinchas Cohen Gan	Michael Craig-Martin
Julia Margaret Cameron	Henri Cartier-Bresson	Eduardo Chillida	James Collins	Fritz Cremer
Colin Campbell	Étienne Carjat	Christo	Miguel Condé	José Luis Cuevas
Peter Campus	Ugo Carrega	Chryssa	Tony Conrad	Edward Curtis
Louis Cane	Lewis Carroll	Chuck Close	Steven Cortright
Vlassis Caniaris	Claude Chabrol	Harold Cohen	Claudio Costa
D
Miodrag Djuric (Dado)	Douglas Davis	Walter De Maria	Jim Dine	Juan Downey
Louis Daguerre	Ger Dekkers	Agnes Denes	Alfred & John Bool and Henry Dixon	Peter Downsbrough
Hanne Darboven	Willem de Kooning	Fred Deux	Dore O.	Michael Druks
Alan Davie	Philip Henry Delamotte	Jan Dibbets	Ugo Dossi	Marcel Duchamp
John Davies	Jack Delano	Braco Dimitrijević	Christian Dotremont	David Douglas Duncan
E
Don Eddy	Paul Eliasberg	Heinz Emigholz	Ulrich Erben	Walker Evans
Benni Efrat	Ger van Elk	Ed Emshwiller	Hugo Erfurth	Valie Export
Sergei Eisenstein	Peter Henry Emerson	Leo Erb	Garth Evans
F
Öyvind Fahlström	Federico Fellini	Dan Flavin	Charles Frazier	FIU - Free International University for Creativity & Interdisciplinary Research
Lee Friedlander	Roger Fenton	Richard Fleischner	Hermine Freed	Hamish Fulton
Ralston Farina	Armand Fernandez	Corsin Fontana	Wil Frenken
Heide Fasnacht	Vincenzo Ferrari	Fred Forest	Achim Freyer
Rainer Werner Fassbinder	Robert Filliou	Terry Fox	Gisèle Freund
Hans-Peter Feldmann
G
Wolfgang Gäfgen	Jochen Gerz	Tina Girouard	Dan Graham
	Paul-Armand Gette	Michael Gitlin	Eve Gramatzki	Alan Green
Alexander Gardner	Peter Gidal	Wilhelm von Gloeden	Tom J. Gramse	Marty Greenbaum
Winfred Gaul	William Giersbach	Jean-Luc Godard	Gotthard Graubner
Rupprecht Geiger	Gilbert & George	Hubertus Gojowczyk	Nancy Graves	Robert Grosvenor
Michael Geißler	Frank Gillette	Kuno Gonschior		Hetum Gruber
Arnold Genthe	Raimund Girke	Camille Graeser	Renato Guttuso
H
Roel D’Haese	Haus-Rucker-Co	Bernhard Heisig	Leon Hirszman	Horst P. Horst
Helfried Hagenberg	Erich Hauser	Michael Heizer	Antonius Höckelmann	George Hoyningen-Huene
David Hall	Lady Clementina Hawarden	Al Held	David Hockney	Alfred Hofkunst
Nigel Hall	Ron Hays	Werner Herzog	Anatol Herzfeld	Douglas Huebler
John DiLeva Halpern	Tim Head	Eva Hesse	Rudolf Hoflehner	Danièle Huillet
Philippe Halsman	Erwin Heerich	David Octavius Hill	Edgar Hofschen	Alfonso Hüppi
Richard Hamilton	Axel Heibel	John Hilliard	Hans Hollein
Heijo Hangen	Birgit Hein	John Hilliard	Nan Hoover
Noriyuki Haraguchi	Dietrich Helms	Lewis Hine	Rebecca Horn
Karl Horst Hödicke	Wilhelm Hein
I
Shōhei Imamura	Will Insley	Jean Ipoustéguy	Patrick Ireland	Hans Paul Isenrath
J
Ken Jacobs	Paul Jaray	Jasper Johns	Frances Benjamin Johnston
Miklós Jancsó	Jo Jastram	Douglas James Johnson	Donald Judd
Horst Janssen	Alejandro Jodorowsky	Joan Jonas	Martha Jungwirth
K
Wolf Kahlen	Buster Keaton	Jürgen Klauke	Beryl Korot	Ferdinand Kriwet
Max G. Kaminski	Ellsworth Kelly	Alexander Kluge	Joseph Kosuth	Germaine Krull
Howard Kanovitz	Michael Kenny	Werner Knaupp	Jannis Kounellis	Shigeko Kubota
Tadeusz Kantor	André Kertész	Günther Knipp	András Kovács	Stanley Kubrick
Allan Kaprow	Anselm Kiefer	Milan Knížák	Attila Kovács	Gary Kuehn
Dani Karavan	Harry Kipper	Imi Knoebel	Kurt Kren
Marin Karmitz	Alain Kirili	Alice Kochs	Dieter Krieg
	Ronald B. Kitaj	Christof Kohlhöfer	Richard Kriesche
On Kawara	Konrad Klapheck	Jiří Kolář	Les Krims	Willem de Kooning
L
László Lakner	Barry Le Va	Michael Leisgen	Robert Lawrance Lobe	Urs Lüthi
Arthur Lamothe	Russell Lee	Les Levine	Francisco López Hernández	George Platt Lynes
Richard Landry	Jean Le Gac	Sol LeWitt	Antonio López García
Nikolaus Lang	Gustave Le Gray	Roy Lichtenstein	Joseph Losey
Dorothea Lange	Malcolm Le Grice	Richard Lindner	Bernhard Luginbühl
John Latham	Barbara Leisgen	Michael Lingner	Bernhard Lüthi
M
Heinz Mack	Alistair Maclennan FIU	Kenneth Martin	Robert McDowell FIU	Gerhard Merz
Alexander Mitta	Robert Morris	Nino Malfatti	Mario Merz	Milan Mölzer
Felix H. Man	Roberto Matta	Borg Mesch	Bernard Moninot	Ugo Mulas
Robert Mangold	Gordon Matta-Clark	Annette Messager	Henry Moore	Antoni Muntadas
Andy Mann	Wolfgang Mattheuer	Adolphe de Meyer	Stefan Moore	Walter Murch
Werner Mantz	Cynthia Lee Maughan	Duane Michals	Carmengloria Morales	J.J. Murphy
Piero Manzoni	Anthony McCall	Henri Michaux	Marcello Morandini	Zoran Mušič
Giacomo Manzù	Barry McCallion	Rune Mields	Pit Morell	Eadweard Muybridge
Alfons Maria Mucha	Robert Mapplethorpe	Bruce McLean FIU	Joseph McWilliams FIU	Antoni Miralda
François Morellet	Brice Marden	Syd Mead	Josef Mikl	María Moreno
Agnes Martin	Dariush Mehrjui	Joan Miró	Malcolm Morley
N
Tomitaro Nachi	Bruce Nauman	Wolfgang Nestler	Nicéphore Niépce	Maria Nordman
Nadar	Charles Nègre	Richard Newton	Ansgar Nierhoff	Gabriele Nothhelfer & Helmut Nothhelfer
Maurizio Nannucci	Werner Nekes	Max Neuhaus	Richard Nonas	Lev Nussberg
O
Dore O.	Timothy H. O'Sullivan	Roman Opalka	Nagisa Ōshima
Oswald Oberhuber	Claes Oldenburg	Dennis Oppenheim	Jean Otth
Brian O'Doherty	Claudio Olivieri	Anna Oppermann
P
Hilmar Pabel	Rainer Pagel FIU	Giulio Paolini	A. R. Penck	Lucio Pozzi
Nam June Paik	Eduardo Paolozzi	Peng Wan-Ts	Pablo Picasso	Otto Piene
Blinky Palermo	Gordon Parks	Beverly Pepper	Walter Pichler	Heinz-Günter Prager
Mario Prassinos	Magnús Pálsson	Sergei Parajanov	Dolores Pacileo	Anne and Patrick Poirier
Gianni Piacentino	Panamarenko	Pier Paolo Pasolini	Wolfgang Petrick	Sigmar Polke
Gina Pane	Max Peintner	Friederike Pezold	Don Potts
Q
Isabel Quintanilla	Daniel Quintero
R
William Raban	John Reilly	Jacob August Riis	Peter Roehr	Ed Ruscha
David Rabinowitch	James Reineking	Bridget Riley	Ulrike Rosenbach	Ken Russell
Arnulf Rainer	Albert Renger-Patzsch	Klaus Rinke	James Rosenquist	Claude Rutault
Yvonne Rainer	Jean Renoir	Larry Rivers	Gerhard Richter	Reiner Ruthenbeck
Robert Rauschenberg	Alain Resnais	Jacques Rivette	Roberto Rossellini	Robert Ryman
Man Ray	Erich Reusch	Józef Robakowski	Dieter Roth	Éric Rohmer
Tony Ray-Jones	Hans Peter Reuter	Dorothea Rockburne	Arthur Rothstein
Martial Raysse	George Rickey	Alexander Rodchenko	Gerhard Rühm	Reindeer Werk
S
Hans Salentin	Tomas Schmit	Paul Sharits	Michael Singer (artist)	Edward Steichen
Sohrab Shahid Saless	Wolfgang Schmitz	Martin Schwarz	Willi Sitte	Saul Steinberg
Erich Salomon	Helmut Schober	Martin Scorsese	Neal Slavin	Frank Stella
Lucas Samaras	Eugen Schönebeck	George Segal	David Smith	Alfred Stieglitz
Fred Sandback	Ben Schonzeit	Antonio Seguí	Robert Smithson	John Benjamin Stone
August Sander	Rudolf Schoofs	Friedrich Seidenstücker	Fernando Ezequiel Solanas	Paul Strand
Sarkis Zabunyan	Jan Schoonhoven	Richard Serra	Michael Snow	Jean-Marie Straub
Antonio Saura	Werner Schroeter	Ben Shahn	Alan Sonfist	Liselotte Strelow
Konrad Balder Schäuffelen	Heinz Schubert	Joel Shapiro	Eve Sonneman	Michelle Stuart
Giorgi Shengelaia	Alf Schuler	Charles Sheeler	Keith Sonnier	Josef Sudek
Alexander Schleber	HA Schult	Stephen Shore	Daniel Spoerri	István Szábo
Barbara Schmidt-Heins	Bernard Schultze	Katharina Sieverding	Klaus Staeck	Chihiro Shimotani
Gabriele Schmidt-Heins	Emil Schumacher	Charles Simonds	Ted Stamm	Kenneth Snelson
Ursula Schultze-Bluhm
T
Jiro Takamatsu	Andrei Tarkovsky	Caroline Tisdall FIU	George Trakas	Peter Tuma
Takis	André Thomkins	François Truffaut	Deborah Turbeville
Henry Fox Talbot	Jean Tinguely	Costas Tsoclis	Richard Tuttle
Antoni Tàpies	Gérard Titus-Carmel	Werner Tübke	Cy Twombly
U
Günther Uecker	Lee Ufan	Timm Ulrichs	Hans Uhlmann
V
Giuliano Vangi	Vladimir Veličković	Bill Viola	Klaus Vogelgesang	Hannsjörg Voth
Agnès Varda	Bernard Venet	Luchino Visconti	Wolf Vostell
W
Andrzej Wajda	Weegee		Gottfried Wiegand	Claus Peter Wittig
Willie Walker	William Wegman	Wim Wenders	Klaus Wildenhahn	Krzysztof Wodiczko
Franz Erhard Walther	Peter Weibel	Lina Wertmüller	Dorothee von Windheim
Andy Warhol	Lawrence Weiner	Dsiga Wertow	Gerd Winner	Fritz Wotruba
Ryszard Waśko	Roger Welch	Marthe Wéry	Reindert Wepko van de Wint	Klaus Wyborny
Wolfgang Weber	Peter Weller	Tom Wesselmann	Rainer Wittenborn
Y
Keigo Yamamoto	Yves Yersin	Yoshio Yoshida	Frank Young
Z
Herbert Zangs	Gianfranco Zappettini	Jerry Zeniuk	Heinrich Zille
Krzysztof Zanussi	Michele Zaza	Christian Ziewer	Zush
