= Ralston Farina =

Performance artist in Manhattan (1945–1985)

Ralston Farina, c.1970s

Ralston Farina (1945–1985, born Steven Robert Snyder), was an artist associated with the downtown performance art scene of Manhattan from the 1960s to the 1980s, and who created performances centered around the experience and philosophy of time, including audience-responsive techniques.

He formulated a concept for his performance and aesthetic philosophy called "Time // Time," influenced by peers like Laurie Anderson and Scott Burton, and encouraged by John Cage. Cage, who Farina maintained a correspondence with, was known for making compositions such as 4′33″ that dealt with time as a medium, and for popularizing the idea of chance-operations among fine artists. Other influences on Farina's conception of time included philosophers Henri Bergson, Ludwig Wittgenstein, and Edmund Husserl.

He sometimes referred to his work as "Zeitkunst", "Time Art" or "Time Time". For most of his career, Farina forbade documentation of his work, afraid that his methods would be stolen.

== Life and education ==
As a child in Philadelphia, Farina studied magic, which would influence his performances later in life. Growing up, he was also a fan of Ernie Kovacs, which some critics connect to his use of comedic timing.

After working in NYC for many years, Farina moved to California. He died in California, at age 38.

== Work and philosophy ==
Ralston Farina became known for centering his artistic explorations around time, including coming up personal methods to systematize, mathematize, and diagram time as they related to his art and performance practice.. Asked to explain his work he once claimed, "My medium is time. The materials I work with, the objects and images, are merely moments of punctuation, phrasing and articulation. The intended image is timing. The intended object is the time. The result is novelty phenomena.” Venues that he performed at included 112 Greene, 3 Mercer Street, Artists Space, Idea Warehouse (1975), the Kitchen (1980), The Poetry Project (1969), the Museum of Modern Art (1976), Documenta 6 (1977), the Paris Biennale (1977), Princeton University, and the American Center in Paris.

Farina was close to the scene that emerged around the happenings of Fluxus, but moved in a direction influenced by other cultural movements and influences in New York City, such as No Wave and experimental theatre, that led him to be recognized as an influence on experimental theatre and performance of the 1970s. In 1977 He was included in two major exhibits of global contemporary art, the 1977 Paris Biennale and Documenta 6.

In 1969, Farina began performing at the Poetry Project under the moniker "Steven Raven". In 1977 He was included in two major exhibits of global contemporary art, the 1977 Paris Biennale and Documenta 6. IN 1978, Farina performed Random Eye-Rolling Exercises for Aesthetic Immortality at 112 Greene Street, an alternative space that would later become White Columns. In 1980, Farina presented Aléatoire Je Ne Sais Quoi at the Kitchen.

Farina also performed the street, in a manner that was popular in New York City at the time, sometimes described as guerilla performance. Describing a performance in 1975, Lucy Lippard wrote "he put sacks of flour at the intersection of Spring and West Broadway, creating clouds, or snowstorms, when cars ran over them; dog biscuits were laid on the street and outlined in chalk (like accident victims) and he wrote: "When the truth vanishes from the arts, it's gone forever", which might serve as an epitaph for SoHo."

== Legacy ==
For most of his career, Farina forbade documentation of his work, and much of his work was known through word of mouth. Ralston Farina gained renewed attention in the contemporary art world in 2010, when some ephemera from his performances was included in a 2010 show at the Whitney Museum about the downtown object theatre and loft performance scene, curated by Jay Sanders. In 2017, The Kitchen made Aléatoire Je Ne Sais Quoi available to view on their digital platform. In 2026, Farina and his archive were the subject of an exhibit at Artists Space, where Sanders is director and chief curator.

In 2011, J. Hoberman argued that the recovered photographs of him in various performance context and the recollections of his peers as to the presence he held suggest he was a larger influence on the downtown performance scene than had been formerly established.

John Cage wrote of Farina that "His work is strong and beautiful; it comes across as a vision." In an overview of performance art written for Soho Weekly News, critic John Howell noted that, "As I look back over the '70s, Ralston Farina stands out as an innovator, Chaplinesque and delightful."
