= Mac Adams =

British artist (born 1943)

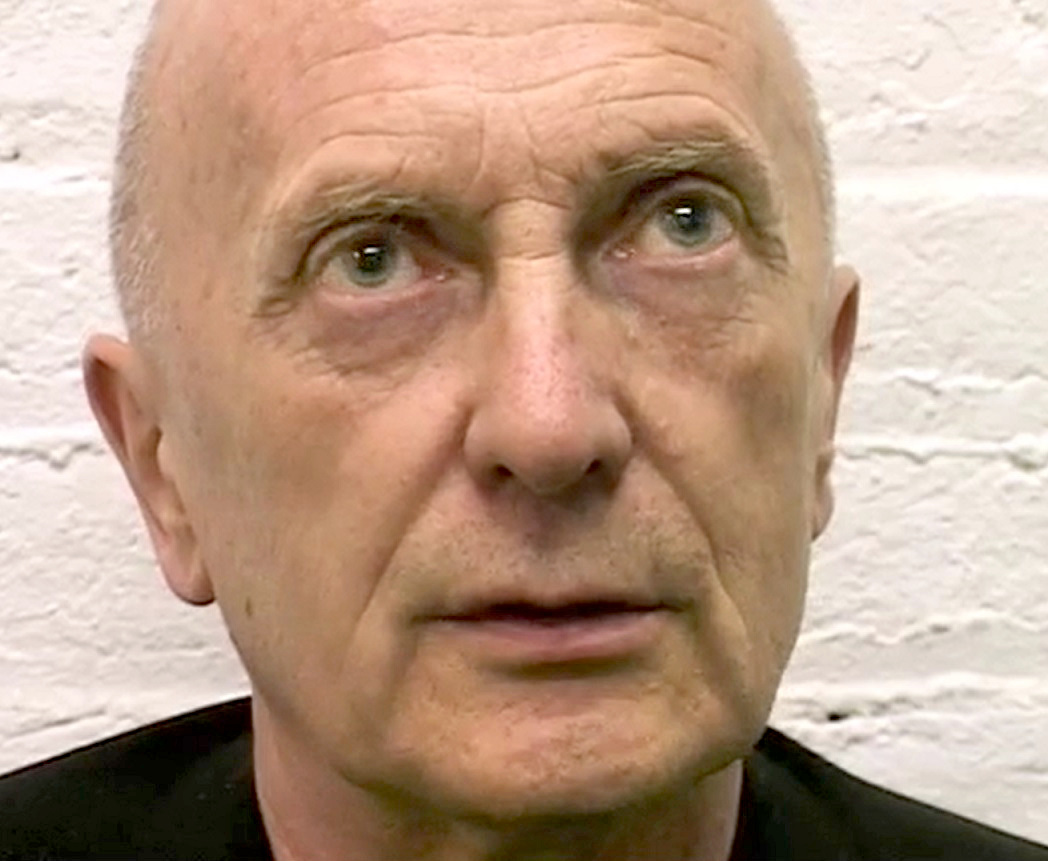
- Born: 1943 (age 82–83); Brynmawr, South Wales, UK
- Education: Cardiff School of Art & Design; Rutgers University (MFA)
- Known for: Photography, sculpture, narrative Art
- Notable work: The Korean War Veterans Memorial (Battery Park); The Serpent Bearer; Mystery series
- Movement: Conceptual art
- Website: macadamsstudio.com

Mac Adams (born in 1943 in Brynmawr, South Wales, UK) is a British artist.

== Early life and education ==
Adams studied at Cardiff School of Art & Design 1962–1967. In 1966, he married Barbara Whedon, an American art student studying at Cardiff. He has a daughter Boram, born in 1986. Adams Received an MFA degree from Rutgers University (1967–69), where he studied with the fluxest artist Bob Watts. In 1969, while still a grad student Adams participated in the first "Soft Art" Exhibitions at The New Jersey State Museum, along with Richard Serra. Richard Archwager, Keith Sonnier, and John Chamberlain among others.

In 1970, he moved to New York City where he lived and worked until 2002.

== Early mystery work ==
In 1974, his first "Mystery" series was shown at the legendary 112 Green Street Gallery in Soho, New York. In 1976, he began showing with the John Gibson Gallery, where he became part of a movement known as Narrative Art. Adams was associated with a group of Conceptual artists who used fictional text and photographs. He separated himself from these artists by not using any text; instead, he adopted a more semiotic approach to the narrative in which the photograph became a surrogate for text. The 'Mystery' series had a film Noir quality and an extreme narrative compression.

Throughout his career, Adams recognized that the space between the images can be as important as the image itself. He has come to use the term "Narrative Void" (a term used in film when speaking of the space between frames) to describe the meaning in the space between images. These works were exhibited at American Narrative/Story Art: 1967–1977 at the Contemporary Arts Museum in Houston, Documenta 6, Kassel Germany, 1977, Arnolfini Gallery, Bristol, England, 1975–76, Galleria Studio G7, Bologna, Italy 1978, Chapter Arts Center, S. Wales, 1979, and The Nigel Greenwood Gallery, London, 1978, to name a few. These early photographic works became influential for a generation of artists.

At the same time as Adams was making his mystery photographic works, he was also making large sometimes room-size installations of fictional crimes. Tableaux's in which the audience was invited to reconstruct the narrative through interpretation and forensic analysis.

== Shadow work ==
In 1984, Mac Adams began working with shadows. Figurative shadows were projected from structures that were highly abstract, only revealing themselves under certain light conditions. Large outdoor shadow sculptures worked by sunlight responding to the earth’s tilt and shift, e.g.: "The Serpent Bearer" Montclair University 1987. "The Fountainhead" La Jolla Museum of Contemporary Art, California, 1988, "Meditation", Louis Pasture University Strasbourg, France. 1996. "Wings and Wheels" New Jersey Department of Transportation, Cherry Hill N.J. interior sculptures worked with spotlights projected onto abstract sculptures casting figurative shadows onto walls and floors. Models and sculptures were exhibited at Farideh Cadot Gallery New York City 1887 and John Gibson Gallery NYC. 1992. This work influenced another generation of artists, e.g. Tim Nobel and Sue Webster.

== Public work ==
Adams has also made more than 13 large-scale public art projects. He designed the Korean War Memorial at The Battery in New York City. This was one of the first major memorials dedicated to the Korean War in the United States, and was installed in 1991.

== Teaching ==
In 2009, the State University of New York College at Old Westbury, awarded him Distinguished Teaching Professor.

== Collections ==
Mac Adams's work has been acquired by over 35 public museums such as Museum of Modern Art, New York, Center Pompidou, Paris, Brooklyn, La Jolla Museum of Contemporary Art, California Museum, Mudam, Musee D’Art Moderne, Luxembourg. Harvard University.

== Awards ==
- Pollock/Krasner Foundation Award 2013.
- Awarded Distinguished Teaching Professor. State University of New York. College at Old Westbury 2009.
- New York State University Chancellors Research Award for Excellence in Arts and Humanities. 2002.
- New York State Fellowship for the Arts (Sculpture), 1988
- National Endowment Fellowship for the Arts (Sculpture), 1982
- Berlin Deutscher Akademischer Austauschdienst Berliner Kunstlerprogram, 1981
- National Endowment Fellowship for the Arts, 1980
- National Endowment Fellowship for the Arts, 1977

== Selected bibliography ==
- "The Narrative Void" Mac Adams, Essays by Alexandre Quoi, Francois Cheval, published by Le bec en L'air. 2010
- "Beyond a Shadow of a Doubt", Mac Adams, Essay by Nancy Princenthal, published by Musées de Châteauroux & Éditions joca seria, 2004
- "Crimes of Perception" Mac Adams, Essays by Judicael Lavrador & Yannick Vigouroux, published by Bank NSMD & Regard, 2001.
- Mens Rea. Published by Les editions de L'oeil, stories by Richard Price, Sarah Weeks, Yoann Gourmel, Jean –Bernard Pouy, Gael Teicher. 2006.
- Soulillou, Jacques, Mac Adams, Fonds Regional D'Art Contemorain, second edition, Deuxiemeepoque, 1989–1995.
- Blistene, Bernard, Mac Adams Mysteries, catalogue, Musée De Toulon, Toulon, France 1982.
- Forsha, Lynda, Mac Adams, Fountainhead Museum of Contemporary Art La Jolla,

California, 1989
