= László Lakner =

László Lakner (Hungarian: [ˈlaːsloː ˈlɒknɛr]; born April 15, 1936, in Budapest) is a Hungarian-German painter, sculptor and conceptual artist. He lives and works in Berlin. László Lakner was born in Budapest in 1936. His father was the architect László Lakner (same name), his mother Sára Lakner, born Sárközy. Lakner is the father of the Hungarian artist Antal Lakner, who was born in 1966. After a long period in the cities Essen and Berlin, László Lakner now lives and works exclusively in Berlin, in the Charlottenburg district. Among other art shows, he was invited three times to participate in the Venice Biennale (1972, 1976 and 1990) and once to the documenta in Kassel (1977).

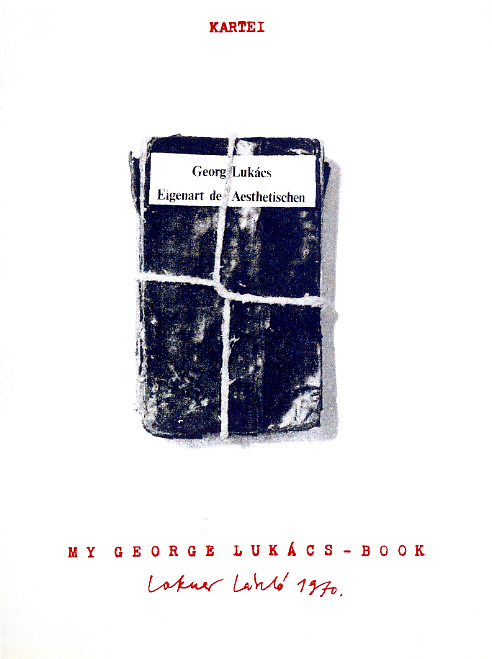
László Lakner, "My Georg Lukács Book", 1970, photo / screenprint, 70 × 50 cm. The title of Lukács's book is: "Peculiarity of the Aesthetic"

== The artist ==
From 1950, László Lakner attended the Art Gymnasium in his native home Budapest. He then studied painting with Professor Aurél Bernáth at the Hungarian Academy for Fine Arts in Budapest from 1954 until his graduation in 1960. In 1959 he created the first of numerous works of art based on found photographs. In 1963, Lakner was approved for his first trip to Western countries. He visited the Federal Republic of Germany and attended the Venice Biennale in Italy in 1964. In 1968 he traveled on a scholarship from the Museum Folkwang, which permitted him a return to the Federal Republic of Germany and visit Switzerland In 1972, Lakner worked for two months in the famous guest house of the Museum Folkwang in the city of Essen, where Martin Kippenberger also worked in a studio some years later. In 1974, he was invited to Berlin with a DAAD scholarship for the DAAD Artists-in-Berlin Program and decided to emigrate to Germany. In 1976 he was awarded the Bremen "Art Prize of Böttcherstraße" and in 1977 he was invited to the documenta VI in Kassel, where he exhibited several works from the fields of painting, drawing and book objects.

In the same year he received the German Critics' Prize and worked during 1981-1982 with a scholarship from the Berlin Senate in New York at MOMA P.S.1 art studio and gallery, at the same time as the Essen sculptor Carl Emanuel Wolff.

In 1998, he received the Kossuth Prize, the most prestigious Hungarian State Prize for his artistic work. In 2000, his self-portrait was included in the collection of the Uffizi Gallery / Galleria degli Uffizi in Florence.

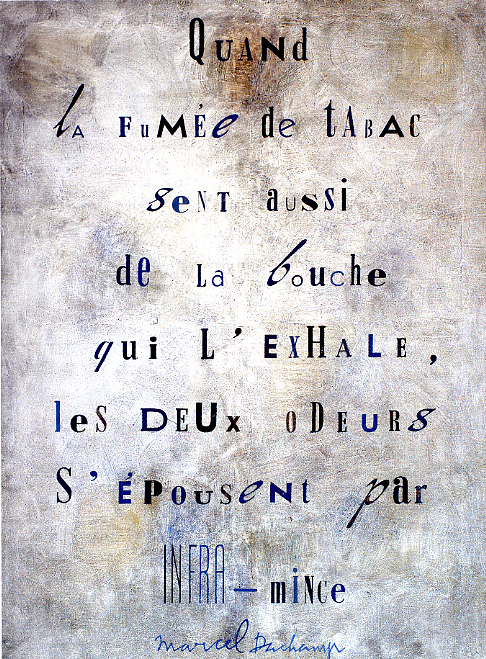
László Lakner, "Marcel Duchamp", 1975-1976, oil on canvas, 190 × 140 cm, State Museums of Berlin, National Gallery Berlin

== The teacher ==
In 1979, Prof. Paul Vogt, the director of the Museum Folkwang, initiated the appointment of László Lakner as a lecturer of painting at the Essen University of Applied Sciences. He also lectured in the Department of Art History at the Free University of Berlin between 1979 and 1980. In 1982 he was finally appointed to the University of Essen (now the University of Duisburg-Essen), where he taught as a professor of experimental design until his retirement in 2001. In these 19 years he worked in Berlin and in his studio in Essen, which he left after 2002 to settle permanently in the Charlottenburg district of Berlin. Lakner's professorship for experimental design, later occupied by Jörg Eberhard, required a multidisciplinary expertise, as he supervised students from both the University of Essen and the current Folkwang University of the Arts. His students from this period include, among others, the cabaret artist and photographer Dieter Nuhr, painters Dirk Hupe, Jürgen Paas, Eberhard Ross, photographer and stage designer Johannes Gramm, Günter Sponheuer and Frank Piasta

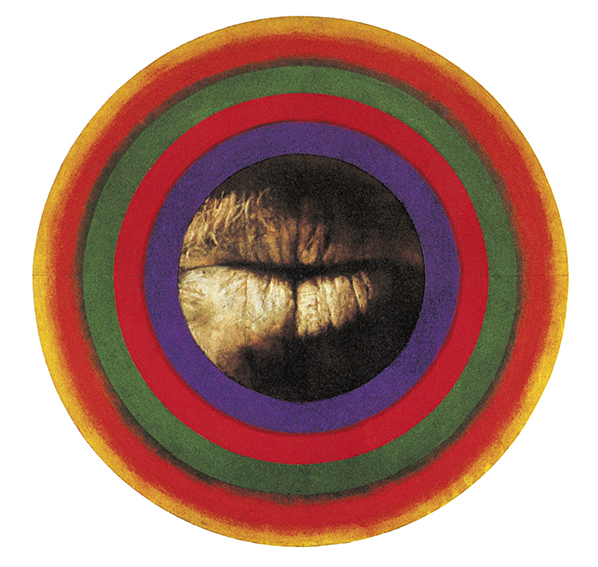
Tondo Mouth 1968, oil on canvas, ø 140 cm, Collection Janus Pannonius Museum, Pécs

== Development of artwork ==
Since his beginnings in the 1950s, Lakner's work has moved with great flexibility and ease among many artistic forms, such as realistic and object-free representations in painting, photography, textual work, film, objects and sculptures. Most of his work was powered by his conceptual way of thinking, and independent of the art form and media used.

He turned his attention repeatedly to the same topics and motives within language, literature and the appearance of writing (see Paul Celan pictures). The artistic results could be transformations of books or manuscripts through paintings or the integrations of books into art objects (see Buchaxt (book-axe)). Other topics include the representations of heads and skulls (see Bandaged Heads) as metaphors or symbolisms of death.

When Lakner modified objects and written texts from famous artists and philosophers, he created a new artistic environment for them. The transition of one art form into another enabled Lakner to add complementary meanings to the quoted works, which would have been impossible if they remained in their original art form.

This recontextualisation could inspire associations with powerful symbolic potential. Since his artistic origins are in realism, Lakner's artwork has evolved using a rich artistic language full of interwoven references and meanings.

=== 1950s to 1970s ===
==== Painting ====
Lakner participated in IPARTERV exhibitions in Budapest in 1968 and 1969, which united the leading critical avant-garde artists in Hungary. In doing so, he presented works that subtly contained contemporary and cultural references. Parallel to non-representational pictures, which are to be understood as experimental, he painted realistic pictures from found photographic documents as early as the late 1950s.

Whilst demonstrating his virtuosity through painting, Lakner inspired associations between the history of art and contemporary political issues (see Seamstresses listen to a speech by Hitler).

Lakner also closely examined the appropriateness of the artistic media used in Eastern European countries with their respective social reality. His observations allowed him to delve deeper into the world of realistic painting.

Lakner also created images that could be attributed to Pop Art (see Rose, 1968, Mund-Tondo / Mouth-Tondo, 1968, Hungarian National Gallery, Budapest). He also experimented with assemblages (see Fugitives, 1966, Hungarian National Gallery and Letter to Barbara, 1964), monochrome paintings, posters and conceptual art; they incorporated sometimes humor. Furthermore, he also painted twin images that juxtaposed the same motif but in two different lighting and color situations (see Danae, 1967, Ludwig-Múzeum, Budapest). Here, Lakner examined the limitations and possibilities within his realistic representations, creating a lasting theme that he continued to work with in Germany.

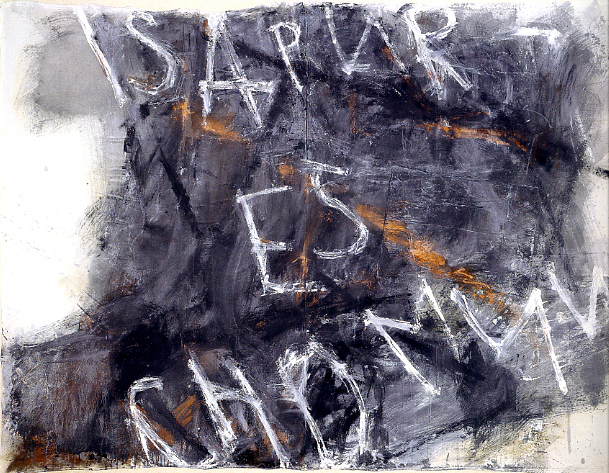
László Lakner, "Isa pur", 1982, mixed media on bed sheets, 260 × 220 cm. Lakner cites from the oldest Hungarian text written in Latin script, The Funeral Sermon and Prayer: “Behold, we are dust and ashes”

==== Conceptual art ====
In his conceptual art Lakner applies various methods of artistic transformation of literature as well as language. A major work in 1970 used a book on aesthetics, written by the Hungarian philosopher George Lukács, who signed it for him. Lakner tied it shut using a piece of string. He then placed the laced book on his studio wall, photographed it and then transformed it into a screen printed image. This work (and its novel method of fabrication) was exhibited in 1972 at the Venice Biennale in the International Pavilion. Lakner continued working with this process by lacing other books, as well as creating photorealistic paintings of such situations.

A similarly photorealistic painting is his naked self-portrait, in which he stands looking at the viewer, wearing only flip-flops and sunglasses. It is regarded as an outstanding political statement on the situation of the artist in the repressive Hungarian regime (see Self-portrait with self-timer, 1970, Uffizi Gallery, Florence. The wish for change inspired many of his works (see Monument of the Revolutions, 1971, Museum Folkwang, Essen and Barricade 1970 / oil on canvas / 150 × 200 cm). He continued to base his photorealistic paintings on photographic documents, often in brown-grey colours, brilliantly painting the change of sharpness in the depth of field from the original photo (Silence, Homage to Joseph Beuys, 1972 Ludwig Museum, Budapest).

His attention turned increasingly to historical documents from different centuries, such as letters, dispatches or testaments. He carefully re-represented manuscripts, often written by famous people, showing them in front of a spatial background (see After Schopenhauer / Fragment). This is the continuation of the previously mentioned usage of quotes in new artistic contexts, as well as an innovative exploration of using written text as a subject in paintings. This liberates the viewer to see them from a purely aesthetic perspective; as colour and shape (see Cézanne's Last Letter, 1975, Museum Boijmans Van Beuningen, Rotterdam). During this time Lakner received a DAAD scholarship in Berlin and migrated to the Federal Republic of Germany (1974).

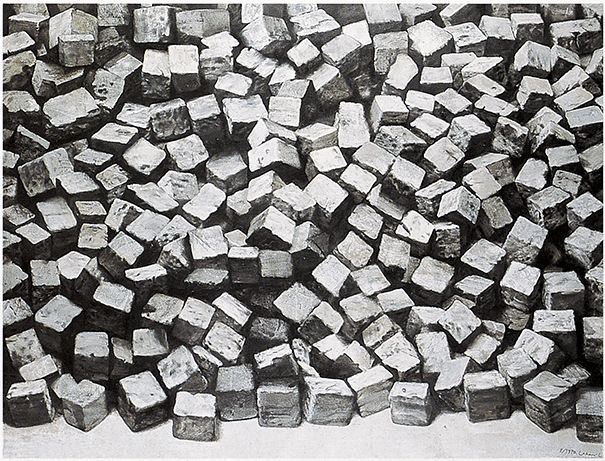
Barricade 1970 / oil on canvas / 150 × 200 cm

=== 1980s to the present ===
Lakner's guest stay 1981-1982 in New York at MoMA PS1 studio and gallery was significant. Here Lakner experienced the illness and death of a good friend. During this time, he became also aware of graffiti on the walls of houses and in subway shafts. As a result, he painted on large bed sheets, in which individual words or slogans were applied with spray paint. "At that time, the graffiti of the Puerto Rican boys in the streets of New York meant more to me than anything else I saw in museums and galleries." He wanted "Black Milk", the words from Paul Celan's poem Death Fugue, "written big on a wall with a flamethrower." In Isa Pur, Museum Ludwig, Cologne, he cites the oldest Hungarian Funeral Sermon and Prayer written in Latin script: “Behold, we are dust and ashes”. The single letters above the patchy colored ground are created by spray paint, or the paint is scratched away, reinforcing his narrative about life and death.

From the second half of the 1980s the abstract drawings, which could partly be read as rudimentary writing, were etched on thick impasto layers of paint. This technique resulted in pictures with graphic entanglements and lines above the color ground (see work group of splitted images on a box-like deep canvas, 1994). In addition, he also made realistic sculptural works in bronze, which integrated not only the human figure, but also books (see Babel, 1985). On the monument for the Hungarian poet Miklós Radnóti, Lakner shows his inner impressions and feelings, created by the poems, on the surface of an imaginary book, which is cast in bronze. The scripture on the tombstone of John Keats, the romantic English poet, ‘Here lies one whose name is writ in water’, inspired Lakner's painting, Keats' grave.

From the mid-1990s, Lakner's interest returned to photography, which he was able to use conceptually. For example, in Paris he walked around in circles at the fictitious place where the poet Paul Celan committed suicide. Later, he created large-format photo sequences of these places (see exhibition 1999, Galerie Nothelfer, Berlin). In addition, representational images were also created with a new examination of the classical art of painting (see Berenice according to Edgar Allan Poe, 2004 – 2010).

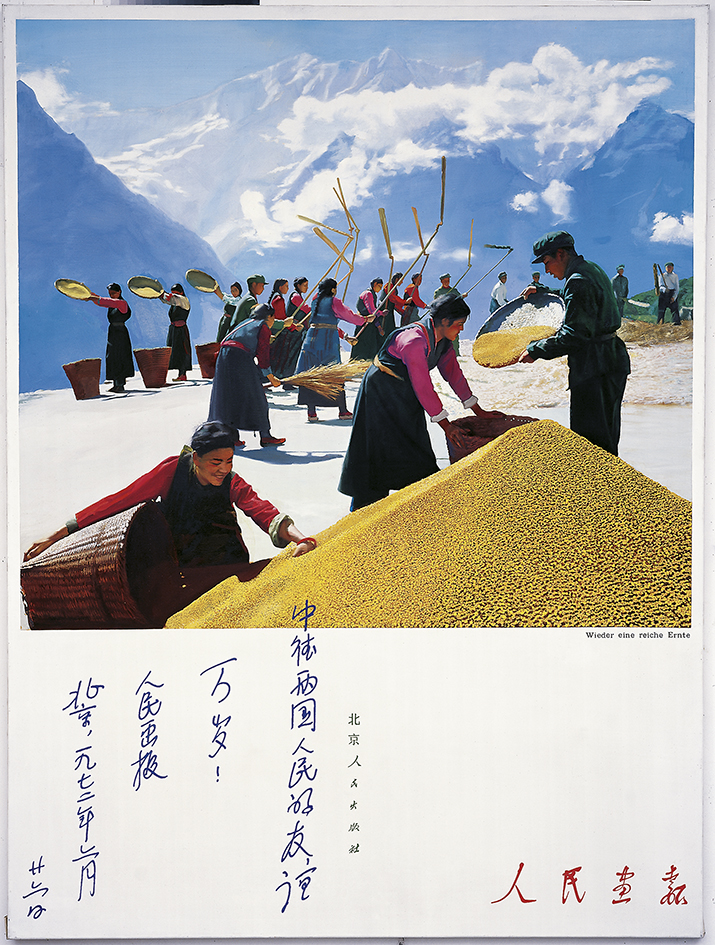
Chinese Postcard, 1972 in the possession of the artist

== Interest in Asian cultures ==
During the Vietnam war (1955-1975) Lakner's interest turned to Asia. Although he did not understand the meaning of calligraphies he saw, he was fascinated by their form and began to paint them. Often, he did not follow the method of calligraphy (painting with ink on rice paper with fast movements), but painted them with oil on canvas with meticulous precision. Not limiting himself with only that technique, he also completely reimagined the Little Red Book "Quotations from Chairman Mao Tse-tung" and created a new version of it with the title MAO BIBLE. Instead of being a source of Mao's ideology for the Cultural Revolution, the book is tightly bound with ropes and it is not possible to open it. Some versions of this "Bible" are cast in bronze.

Another work was produced from an idealised Chinese photo, depicting farmers in the mountains being helped by Chinese soldiers. Lakner enlarged it to create a human-size photorealistic painting. The hand-written greeting of the newspaper editor who sent the photo to him, is also painted on the canvas.

Thus, the results of Lakner's Asian inspirations are artworks which are, despite their Asian topics, not copies of Asian art. They are rather transformations from Asian into Western traditions. They represent Lakner's conceptual innovations and multitude of artistic methods, with which he continues to explore the world.

Cover of the 80 pages art catalog "László Lakner Chinese Postcard". It shows works of the artist inspired by Asian culture. June 2018

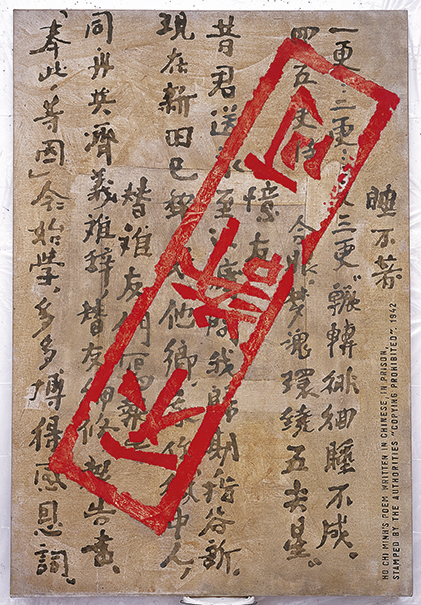
Poem of Ho Chi Minh, Written in Prison in 1942, 1974, Oil on canvas / 200 × 135 cm, private collection Germany

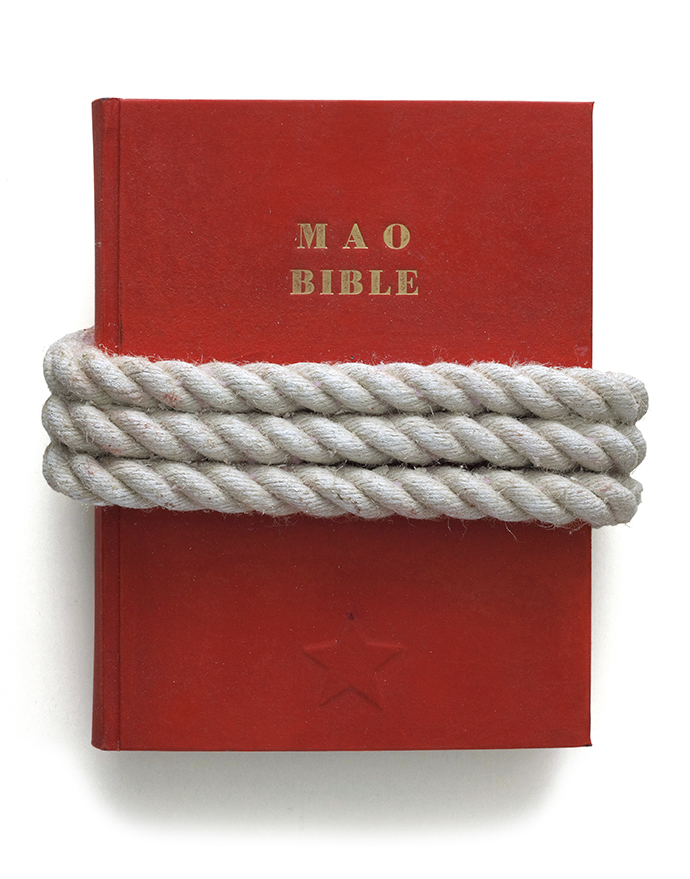
MAO-BIBLE 1987 / book, rope, acrylic paint / 30 × 38 × 8 cm, In the possession of the artist

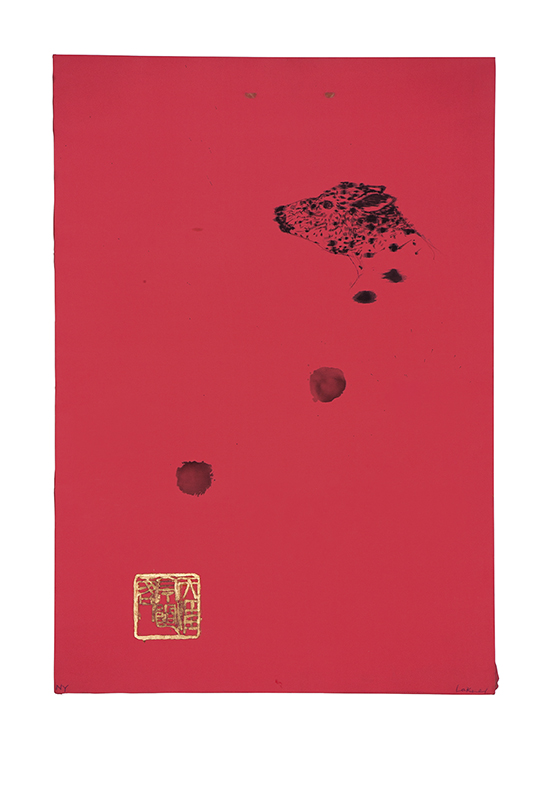
Wild Dog 1987 / Chinese calligraphy ink on colored cloth / 88 × 65 cm, In the possession of the artist

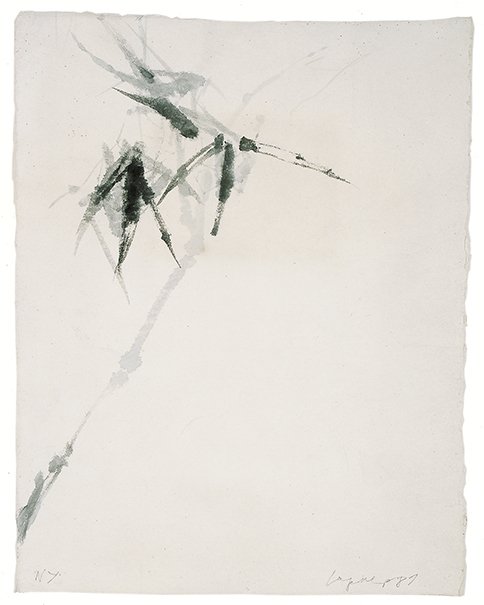
Bamboo (study) 1981 New York / Chinese calligraphy ink on Laid paper / 65 × 40 cm. In the possession of the artist

== Works in public collections ==
- Germany:
  - Museum Ludwig, Aachen
  - Nationalgalerie, Berlin
  - Berlinische Galerie, Berlin
  - Paula Modersohn-Becker Foundation, Bremen
  - Museum Folkwang, Essen
  - Art collection of the University of Freiburg im Breisgau
  - Museum Ludwig, Köln
  - Von der Heydt-Museum, Wuppertal
  - Neues Museum Weserburg, Bremen, from 2010 Kunsthalle, Bremen
- Netherlands:
  - Museum Boymans van Beuningen, Rotterdam
- Poland:
  - Museum of modern art, Łódź
- Hungary:
  - Hungarian National Gallery, Budapest
  - Museum of Fine Arts, Budapest
  - Ludwig-Museum, Budapest
  - Petöfi-Literatur-Museum, Budapest
  - Kiscelli-Museum, Budapest
  - Xántus János Museum, Győr
  - Városi Müvészeti Museum, Győr
  - Hatvany Lajos Museum, Hatvan
  - Janus Pannonius Museum, Pécs
  - Vasarely Museum, Pécs
  - Szent István Király Museum, Székesfehérvár
  - Szombathelyi Képtar, Szombathely
- Italy:
  - Uffizi Gallery, Florenz
- Japan:
  - Hara Museum of Contemporary Art, Tokio

== Exhibitions ==
Solo exhibitions (selection):

- 1969 KKI Galeria, Budapest
- 1974 Neue Galerie – Collection Ludwig, Aachen
- 1975 Overbeck-Gesellschaft, Lübeck
- 1975 Neuer Berliner Kunstverein und DAAD, Berlin
- 1975 Galerie Folker Skulima, Berlin
- 1976 Galerie Denise René-Hans Mayer, Düsseldorf
- 1979 Westfälischer Kunstverein, Münster
- 1983 Galerie Bertha Urdang, New York
- 1987 Forum Kunst, Rottweil
- 1998 Stadsschouwburg Heerlen, Niederlande
- 2004 Zacheta Narodowa Galeria Sztuki (Nationalgalerie), Warschau
- 2004 Galeria Sztuki (Kunsthalle), Posen, Polen
- 2004 Ludwig-Museum, Budapest
- 2006 Augsburger Kunstverein
- 2006 Galerie Georg Nothelfer, Berlin
- 2007 Petöfi Irodalmi Museum, Budapest
- 2011 Museum of Fine Arts, Budapest

Participations in exhibitions:

- 1967 XV. Premio Lissone, Milano
- 1972 Venice Biennale, International Section: Pavilion of Graphic
- 1976 Venice Biennale, International Section: Contemporary Art
- 1976 /1977 Bild - Raum - Klang, Wissenschaftszentrum Bonn, Hochschule der Künste Berlin, Institut für Auslandsbeziehungen Stuttgart / Picture-Space-Sound, Science Center Bonn, Berlin University of Arts, Institute for Foreign Relations Stuttgart
- 1977 documenta 6, Kassel
- 1979 Testuale, Milano
- 1981 P.S.1, New York City
- 1982 L'Humour, Centre Pompidou, Paris
- 1983 Neue Nationalgalerie Berlin, Haus der Kunst München, Städtische Kunsthalle Düsseldorf: Neue Malerei in Deutschland / New National Gallery Berlin, Haus der Kunst München, Municipal Kunsthalle Düsseldorf: New Painting in Germany
- 1983 Quadre del viatge, Fondatio Joan Miró, Barcelona
- 1986 Kunstforum Grundkreditbank Berlin: Images of Shakespeare
- 1988 Georg-Kolbe-Museum, Berlin: Skulptur in Berlin 1968–1988 / Sculpture in Berlin 1968 – 1988
- 1992 Venice Biennale: Ambiente Berlin
- 1993 Kunsthalle Wien, Frankfurter Kunstverein: Die Sprache der Kunst / The Language of Art
- 1994 Kunst- und Ausstellungshalle der Bundesrepublik Deutschland, Bonn: Europa - Europa / Art and Exhibition Hall of the Federal Republic of Germany, Bonn: Europe-Europe
- 1995 Kunstverein Augsburg: Bildhauer in Deutschland / Sculptor in Germany
- 1999 Museum Moderner Kunst, Wien: 50 Jahre Kunst aus Mitteleuropa / 50 Years of Art from Central Europe
- 2008 Scuderie del Quirinale, Rom: Pop Art 1956–1968
- 2015 Walker Art Center, Minneapolis (International Pop)
- 2018 Wende Museum, Culver City, California: Promote, Tolerate, Ban: Art and Culture in Cold War Hungary.

== Literature (selection) ==
In English

(The English Literature list is much shorter than the German. Therefore, see also the German Literature list below this English list.)

- Promote, Tolerate, Ban: Art and Culture in Cold War Hungary Exhibition catalogue. Edited by Cristina Cuevas-Wolf and Isotta Poggi. Essays by Katalin Cseh-Varga, Cristina Cuevas-Wolf, Dávid Fehér, Steven Mansbach, Géza Perneczky, Isotta Poggi, and Tibor Valuch. 160 pages, 8 1/2 x 10 3/4 inches, 40 color and 20 b/w illustrations, ISBN 978-1-60606-539-6, hardcover. Getty Publications, Imprint: Getty Research Institute, 2018
- The Montage Connection between John Heartfield and László Lakner: Artistic Resistance and a New Leftism in Sixties Europe
- Flashes of the Future - The Art of the 68ers or The Power of the Powerless. Exhibition catalogue of Ludwig Forum Aachen, 2018
- Dávid Fehér: László Lakner, Budapest: Hungart Publications, 2016
- Dávid Fehér: László Lakner: Seamstresses Listen to Hitler’s Speech, Dávid Fehér ed., cat. Budapest: Museum of Fine Arts, 2011
- Dávid Fehér: Polyphonic Oeuvre. On László Lakner’s Art, in: László Lakner: Selected Works, exh cat. Budapest: Trapéz Galéria, 2019, 3–10.
- Dávid Fehér: Consonants of Karl Marx. Left vs. Left in the Hungarian Neo-Avantgarde: The Case of László Lakner, Tomus 56, Acta Historiae Artium, 2015, 343–353.
- Dávid Fehér: Beyond the Monochrome: Polychromy and monochromy in the art of László Lakner, in: Lakner László: Overview and Monochromy. Selected Works, László Hegyeshalmi – Dávid Fehér eds., exh. cat. Veszprém: House of Arts László Vass Collection, 2018, 9–17.
- Dávid Fehér: (Dis)figuring Reality. New Forms of Figuration in Hungarian Painting (1957-1975), in: Sándor Hornyik, Edit Sasvári and Hedvig Turai eds.: Art in Hungary 1956-1980: Doublespeak and Beyond, London: Thames & Hudson, 2018, 136–159.
- Dávid Fehér: Pop Beyond Pop. Some Exhibitions of the Hungarian “Iparterv-Circle”, in: Art in Transfer in the Era of Pop. Curatorial Practices and Transnational Strategies, Annika Öhrner ed., Stockholm: Södertörn University, 2017, 343–372.

In German

(These articles in German language are listed in the Literature section of the German Wikipedia article about László Lakner. That German list is here translated to English for orientation, in case you want to translate them by yourself or using machine translation, e.g. Google https://translate.google.com/ or Bing https://www.bing.com/translator)

- László Lakner: Gesammelte Dokumente 1960 - 1974; Neue Galerie - Sammlung Ludwig, Aachen 1975 (Text Wolfgang Becker) und Overbeck-Gesellschaft, Lübeck 1975 (Text Thomas Deecke) / László Lakner: Collected Documents 1960 - 1974; New Gallery - Collection Ludwig, Aachen 1975 (text Wolfgang Becker) and Overbeck Society, Lübeck 1975 (text Thomas Deecke)
- Thomas Deecke: Laszlo Lakner: Documenta 6 / Vol. 1, p. 96, Kassel 1977
- László Lakner: Malerei / Painting 1974 - 1979; Westfälischer Kunstverein Münster 1979 (Text by Thomas Deecke)
- László Lakner: The Raven, Edgar Allan Poe; Berlin 1988, ISBN 388537109X
- László Lakner: Papierarbeiten, Objekte & 3 Skulpturen 1976–1990 (Red. und Gestaltung: Manfred de la Motte); Berlin 1991, ISBN 3893570233 / László Lakner: Paper Works, Objects & 3 Sculptures 1976-1990 (Ed. and Design: Manfred de la Motte); Berlin 1991, ISBN 3893570233
- Joachim Sartorius: Was im Turm begann. Ein Zyklus von siebzehn Gedichten mit sechs Bildern von László Lakner; Aachen 1995, ISBN 3-89086-868-1 / Joachim Sartorius: What Started in the Tower. A Cycle of seventeen Poems with six Paintings by László Lakner; Aachen 1995, ISBN 3-89086-868-1
- László Lakner: Köpfe und Schädel. Eine Bildauswahl aus den Jahren 1957, 1981–1995; Mit Fragmenten eines Gesprächs zwischen Thomas Hirsch und László Lakner; Aachen 1997, ISBN 3-89086-827-4 / László Lakner: Heads and Skulls. A Selection Of Images from 1957, 1981 – 1995; With Fragments of a Conversation between Thomas Hirsch and László Lakner; Aachen 1997, ISBN 3-89086-827-4
- Reinhard Kiefer: Der Doppelgänger. Für Karl Otto Götz zum 80. Geburtstag, u. a.; Aachen 1999, ISBN 3-89086-785-5 / Reinhard Kiefer: The Doppelganger. For Karl Otto Götz on his 80th Birthday, i.a.; Aachen 1999, ISBN 3-89086-785-5
- Theo Buck: Bildersprache. Celan-Motive bei László Lakner und Anselm Kiefer; Aachen 1993, ISBN 3-89086-883-5 / Theo Buck: Imagery. Celan motifs with László Lakner and Anselm Kiefer; Aachen 1993, ISBN 3-89086-883-5
- Janos Brendel: Laszlo Lakner - Das Frühwerk, Budapest 1959 - 1973, Uj Müveszet Kiado 2000, Niessen Buch- und Offsetdruckerei GMBH, Essen / Budapest 2000 / János Brendel: László Lakner-The Early Work, Budapest 1959-1973, Uj Müveszet Kiado 2000, Niessen Book and Offset Printing GMBH, Essen/Budapest 2000
- A. Petrioli Tortani i. a.: Galleria degli Uffizi Firenze, Collezione degli Authoritratti. Selbstporträt László Lakner Budapest 1970, u. a.; Essen 2002, ISBN 393132639X / A. Petrioli Tortani et al.: Uffizi Gallery Florence, Collection of Self-Portraits. Selfportrait László Lakner Budapest 1970, i.a.; Essen 2002, ISBN 393132639X
- Katalin Néray: László Lakner, in: Metamorphosis, Ludwig-Museum Budapest 2004, p. 9–10.
- Györgi Konrád: Lakner, in: Metamorphosis, Ludwig-Museum Budapest 2004, pp. 14–16.
- Thomas Hirsch: Un soir serein. Aspekte in László Lakners Werk seit 1974, in: Metamorphosis, Ludwig-Museum Budapest 2004, S. 243–251. / Thomas Hirsch: A serene evening. Aspects in László Lakner's work since 1974, in: Metamorphosis, Ludwig Museum Budapest 2004, pp. 243–251.
- János Brendel: Homage to Celan, in: Metamorphosis, Ludwig-Museum Budapest 2004, pp. 76–81.
- László Lakner: Buchwerke 1969–2009. Mit Texten von György Konrád, Matthias Flügge, Thomas Hirsch; Meissners Berlin 2009, ISBN 978-3-87527-116-4 / László Lakner: Book works 1969 – 2009. With Texts by György Konrád, Matthias Flügge, Thomas Hirsch; Meissners Berlin 2009, ISBN 978-3-87527-116-4
- László Lakner: Näherinnen hören eine Rede Hitlers. Die Geschichte eines verschollenen und wiedergefundenen Bildes. Text von Dávid Fehér, Museum der Bildenden Künste, Budapest, 2011 (Englische-ungarische Version: Fehér Dávid: Lakner László: Varrólányok Hitler beszédét hallgatják, Seamstresses Listen to Hitler's Speech, Szépművészeti Múzeum, Budapest, 2011) / László Lakner: Seamstresses listen to a speech by Hitler. The story of a lost and rediscovered image. Text by Dávid Fehér, Museum of Fine Arts, Budapest, 2011 (English-Hungarian version: Fehér Dávid: Lakner László: Varrólányok Hitler beszédét hallgatják, Seamstresse's Listen to Hitler's Speech, Szépművészeti Múzeum, Budapest, 2011)
- László Lakner. Referenzen, Dávid Fehér ed., cat. Collegium Hungaricum, Wien, 2016
