= Ted Stamm =

American artist (1944–1984)

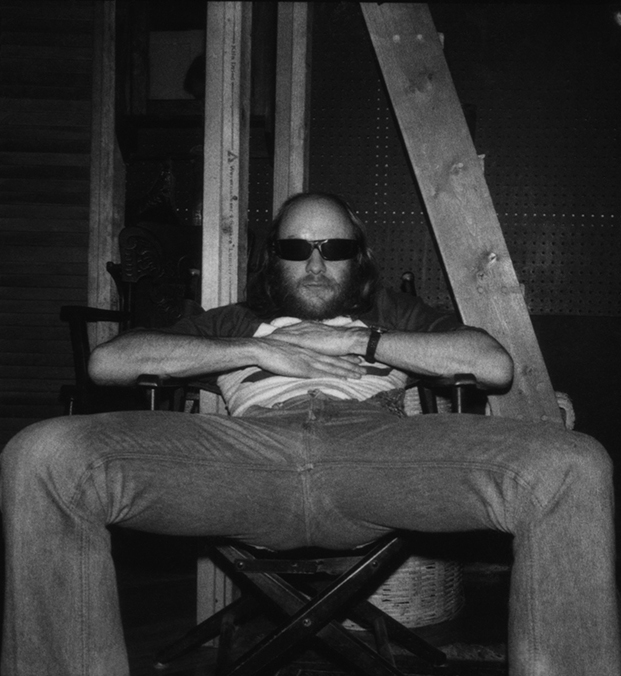
- Stamm in 1980
- Born: 1944; Brooklyn, New York, US
- Died: 1984 (aged 39); New York City, US
- Education: Hofstra University
- Occupation: Painter
- Known for: Painting, drawing, street art
- Movement: Minimalism and conceptualism
- Website: tedstamm.com

Ted Stamm (1944–1984) was an American minimalist and conceptualist artist.

== Biography ==
Ted Stamm grew up in Freeport, New York. He graduated from Hofstra University with a Bachelors of Fine Art, and moved to Soho in downtown Manhattan. His studio, located on Wooster Street in Soho, inspired his "Wooster" series of works. Stamm received fellowships in painting from the John Simon Guggenheim Memorial Foundation, the Fellowship in Fine Arts in 1983, and from the National Endowment for the Arts. During his life he participated in solo and group exhibitions in the United States and worldwide. Stamm also taught at the School of Visual Arts, Hofstra University, and the C. W. Post College (now LIU Post).

He died at the age of 39 due to a congenital heart defect.

== Work ==
In 1972, Stamm began a series of paintings by revising his earlier lyrically abstract canvases. He called this body of work his "Cancel" series, because it was derived from a rigorous and reductive process of applying black paint in a grid-like pattern to cover up and obfuscate colorful underpaintings.

In 1974, Stamm started working with shaped stretchers, introduced the element of line into his paintings and created a new series of work that he continued to develop throughout his life. Stamm's explorations with non-traditional canvas shapes and structures reached an apex from 1974 to 1978 with a group of paintings he called his "Wooster" series.

Consequently, Stamm's work predominantly developed in series, such as the such as the "Dodgers", "Concorde", "Zephyr", and "Designators" series. Although works from these series are formally abstract, they are representations of Stamm's observations of his surroundings and interests.

The "Wooster" series was influenced by the unique shapes of street contours and intersections that Stamm could see from his studio. Critic Robert C. Morgan notes the conceptual novelty of these paintings, which sets them apart from other minimalist and hard edge abstractions: "Given the analytical orientation of the times, many assumed it was based on some complex mathematical derivation; but, in fact, it was quite the opposite. Stamm, being a man of the streets, with bicycle in tow, discovered this abbreviated form one day on the sidewalk near his loft. The fact that he could not decipher its use or origin piqued his curiosity enough to accept it as what might be called an unknown readymade."

The "Dodger" series was inspired by the geometric features of Brooklyn's old trolley tracks, as well as the shape of Ebbets Field, a former Major League Baseball stadium in Flatbush, Brooklyn, which was home of the Brooklyn Dodgers (whose original name was the Brooklyn Trolley Dodgers).

Stamm began his "Zephyr" series in 1979. These paintings are named after the stream-liner train-sets of the same name. The form of the "Zephyr" paintings alludes to both the physical design and the locomotion of the train. These paintings feature a sleek, black cruciform shape. The long diagonal shaped canvases in the "Concorde" series reference the nose cone of a supersonic airliner. Stamm's interest in fast-moving modern vehicles was inspired by his academic study of industrial design in college.

Stamm was also involved in making a series of street artworks during the mid-1970s, which he called "Designators". Stamm created stencils that reference his previous canvas paintings, and used them to spray paint small, abstract black shapes on New York City buildings and urban objects. He documented these ephemeral works of art via photography. In the 1980s, Stamm made "Wooster Designators," which revisited the form of his "Wooster" series paintings, to create red stickers that he affixed to the bumpers and license plates of parked cars.

== Exhibitions ==
Stamm's first exhibition was his inclusion in the group show, Contemporary Reflections at The Aldrich Contemporary Art Museum in Ridgefield, Connecticut in 1972.

Stamm had his first solo exhibition at Artists Space in 1975 at the age of 31. Later that year, he had his first exhibition in Europe at Galerie December in Düsseldorf, Germany and also exhibited at 112 Greene Street.

In 1977, Stamm was included by curator Manfred Schneckenburger in Documenta 6 in Kassel, Germany and by curator René Block in the exhibition New York – Downtown Manhattan – SoHo held at the Akademie der Künste in Berlin. Also, in the same year, Stamm was included in A Painting Show at MoMA PS1 in New York. In 1978, he exhibited at Hal Bromm's gallery and was included in the exhibition The Detective Show at MoMA PS1. The following year, he was one of six contemporary artists in MoMA PS1's New Waves Painting exhibition. In 1982, Stamm had a solo exhibition of paintings at MoMA PS1.

== Collections ==
- The Reading Public Museum
- The Aldrich Contemporary Art Museum
- Art Gallery of Western Australia
- Brooklyn Museum
- Carnegie Museum of Art
- The Guggenheim
- Hall Art Foundation
- The Menil Collection
- Museum of Contemporary Art, Los Angeles
- Museum of Modern Art
- San José Museum of Art
- Smart Museum of Art

== Publications ==
- Ted Stamm 8 Woosters. Düsseldorf: Galerie December. 1997.
- Ted Stamm DRM 1980. New York: Karma. 2017. ISBN 978-1-942607-66-3. OCLC 989037412.
- Bell, Tiffany; Mehring, Christine; Saletnik, Jeffrey; Wasserman, Andrew; Ashley Fox, Elizabeth; Haubro Jensen, Per (2023). Ted Stamm Series (in German). Berlin: Hatje Cantz. ISBN 978-3-7757-5507-8.
- Bacon, Alex (2018). Ted Stamm: Woosters. Additional text by Alex Bacon. Lisson Gallery. ISBN 978-0-947830-67-0. OCLC 1046076042.
