= Erich Hauser =

German sculptor

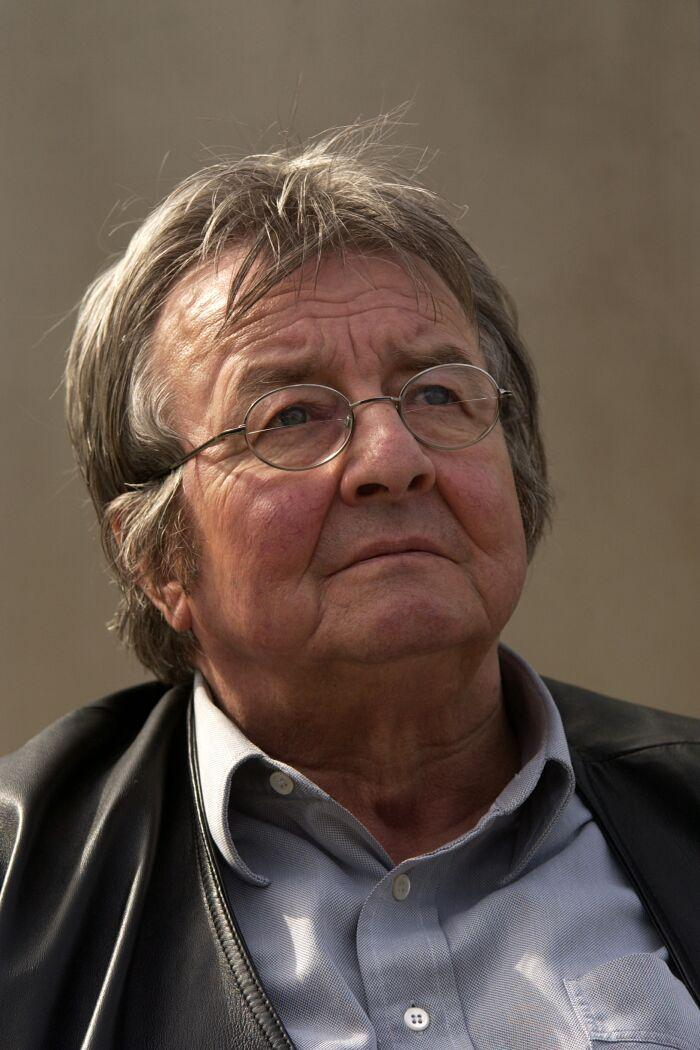
Erich Hauser

Erich Hauser (15 December 1930, Rietheim – 28 March 2004, Rottweil) was a German sculptor.

== Life ==
From 1945 to 1948 Erich Hauser was apprenticed to a steel engraver. Moreover, he was taught drawing and modelling by Father Ansgar at the Beuron Archabbey. Afterwards he studied at the Freie Kunstschule in Stuttgart taking evening classes in sculpting.

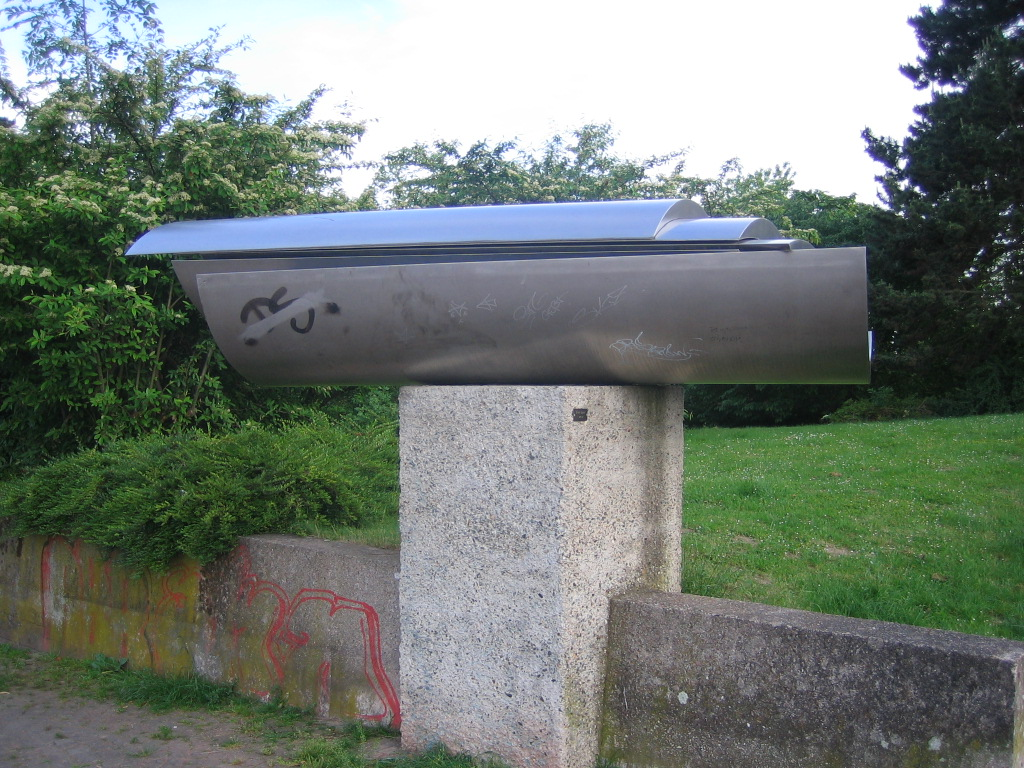
Sculpture by Erich Hauser in Kassel, 1972/73

Since 1952 Hauser worked as a free artist and sculptor. His first influences were the sculptures of the Spanish artist Pablo Picasso and the Italian-French artist Berto Lardera.

In dealing with metal he was influenced by contemporary informel painters of the 1950s. At first his steel sculptures still showed noticeable marks of processing. Later he opted for smooth surfaces. Since 1962 he worked with industrially pre-fabricated steel plates. At the same time he dealt with basic geometrical structures and technical structural elements, which were characteristic of Hauser’s first autonomous works.

He transformed composed surfaces into hollow sculptures to be viewed from all sides, showing edgy burrs and caves. The sculptures cannot be walked-on. Hauser assembled the metal elements in such a way that they finally became regular hollow bodies. Thus he created spheres, cubes and tetrahedrons.

It is significant of these works that they seem likely to break or fall to pieces or be in risky balance.

Hauser’s participation in the documenta III (1964), documenta 4 (1968) and documenta 6 (1977) in Kassel brought about his artistic breakthrough.

From 1964 to 1965 Hauser was a guest lecturer at the school of visual arts in Hamburg. Since then he frequently used pillars as subjects and discovered spatial height. Since 1967 he made his sculptures from polished metal discs shaped as pipes divided lengthwise. In 1969 he was awarded the renowned prize of the São Paulo Art Biennial.

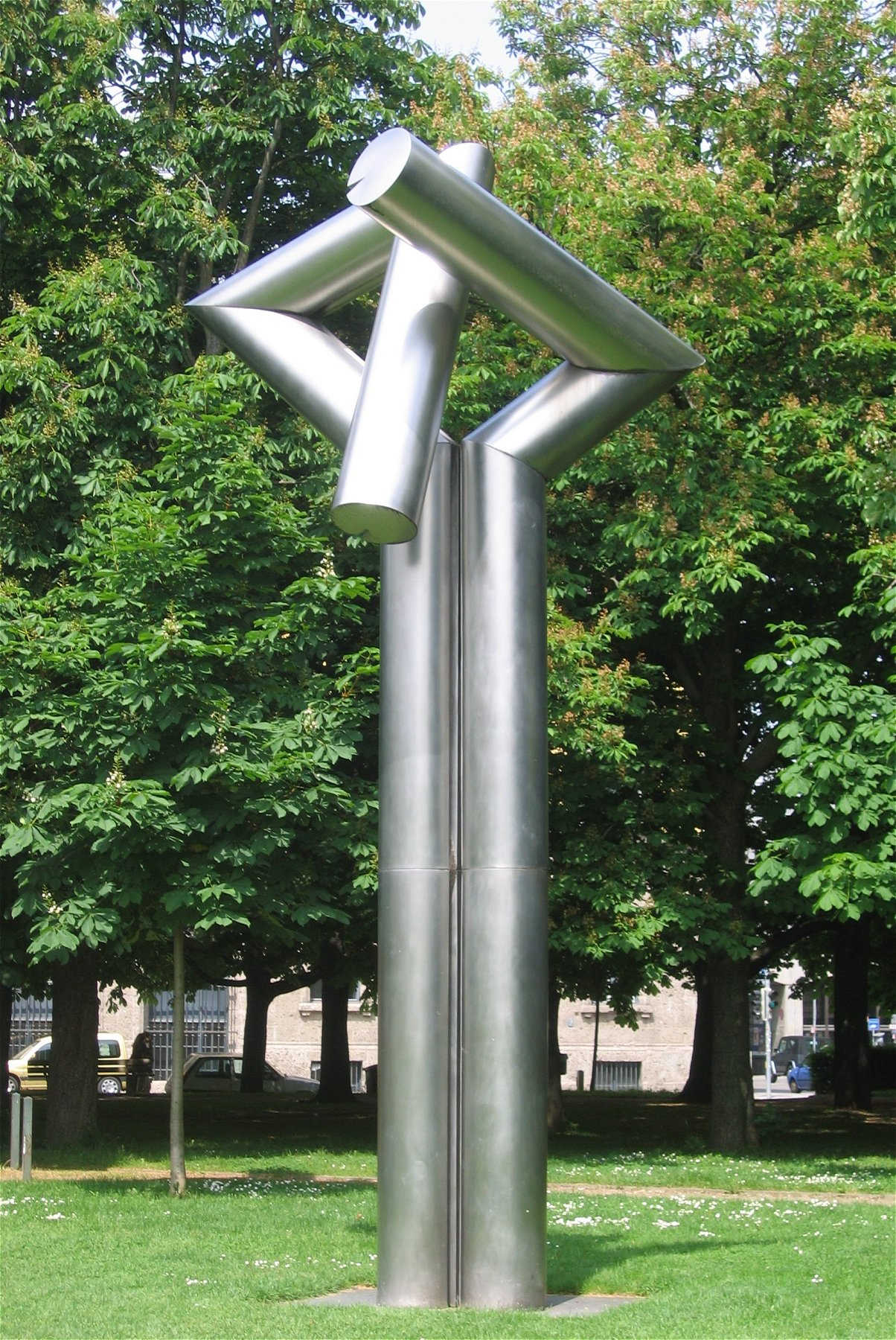
Double pillar 23/70, 1970, in front of Neue Pinakothek in München

In 1970 Erich Hauser became a member of the Art Academy in Berlin.

Since the 1970s he created numerous sculptures for public places e. g. in Darmstadt, Hanover, Kiel and Kassel. In 1971 he created a double sculpture for the Hesse Landesmuseum in Darmstadt, and in 1977 he provided sculptures for the walls of the Berlin State Library. He accepted commissions, and also created small sculptures of crescent-shaped discs on cubic blocks.

In 1970 Hauser moved from Dunningen to Rottweil and helped establish the Forum Kunst Rottweil. Next to his workshop in the so-called Saline, he created a sculpture garden, where the Art Foundation Erich Hauser, which was founded in 1996, and where seventy of his works can be seen to this day. Another of his sculptures is on display on the campus of the University of Bayreuth.

From 1964 to 1985 he was a visiting professor at the school of visual arts in Berlin; in 1986 he received an honorary degree as professor from the state of Baden-Württemberg.

One of his remarkable sculptures is the Stahlengel (steel angel) (1987) in the Hanover Mile of Sculptures. The stainless steel sculpture is 12 metres high and 16 metres wide.

In 1996 the Erich Hauser-Stiftung e.V (Erich Hauser Foundation) was founded. Its main purpose is the preservation and presentation of Hauser’s works.

== Honours ==
- In 2000 Erich Hauser was awarded the Verdienstmedaille (medal of merit) of the state of Baden-Württemberg and the cultural award of the city of Rottweil
- A vocational school in Rottweil was named Erich-Hauser-Gewerbeschule.

== Exhibitions ==
- documenta 3 1964 in Kassel
- documenta 4 1968 in Kassel
- documenta 6 1977 in Kassel

== Works (assorted examples) ==
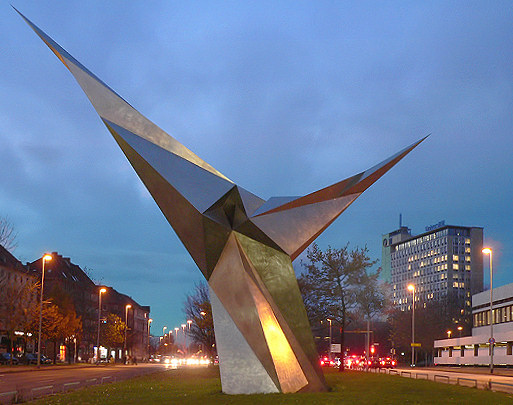
Stahlengel(steel angel) in Hanover

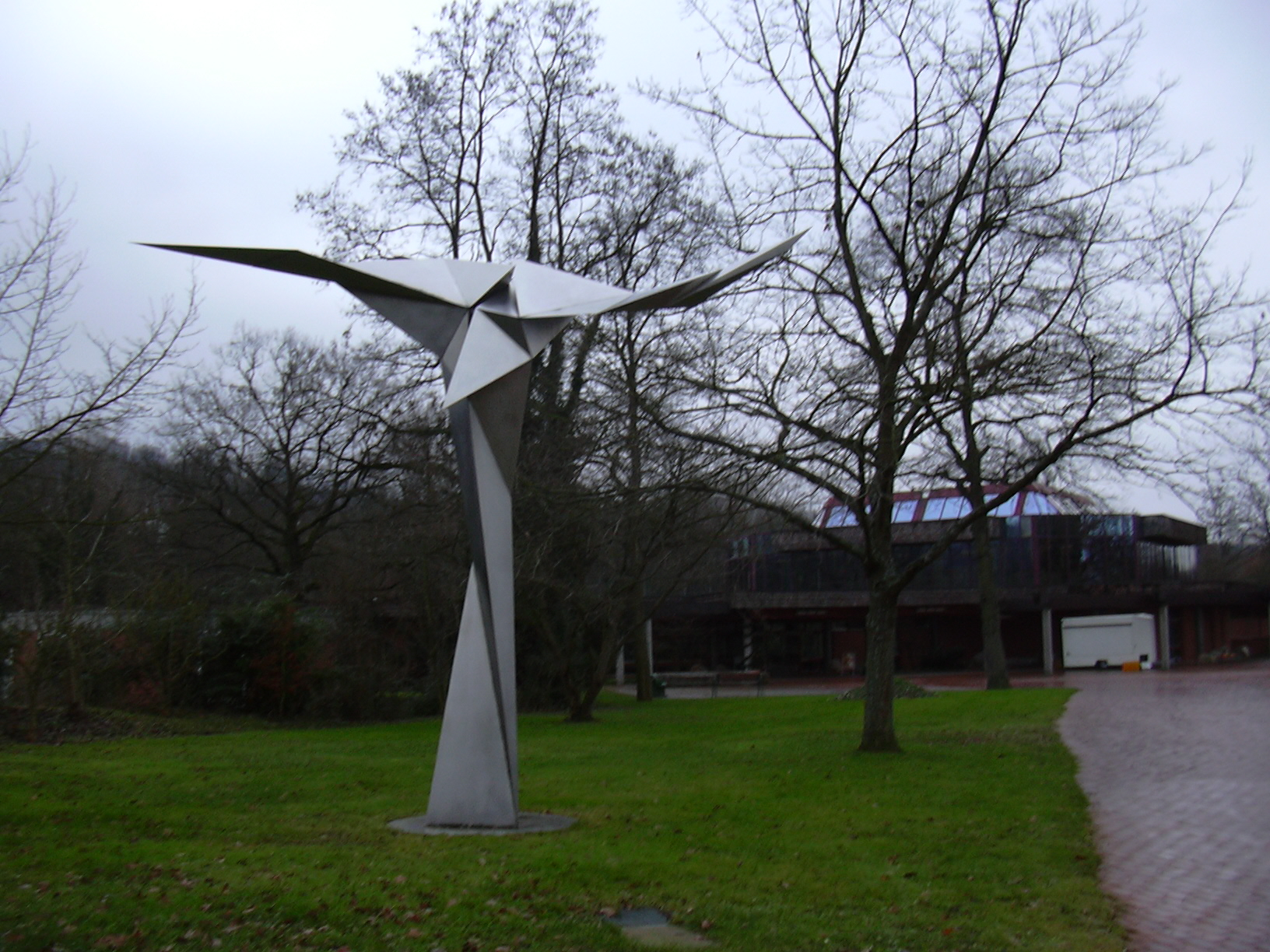
Steel sculpture in front of thermal bath in Bad Bellingen

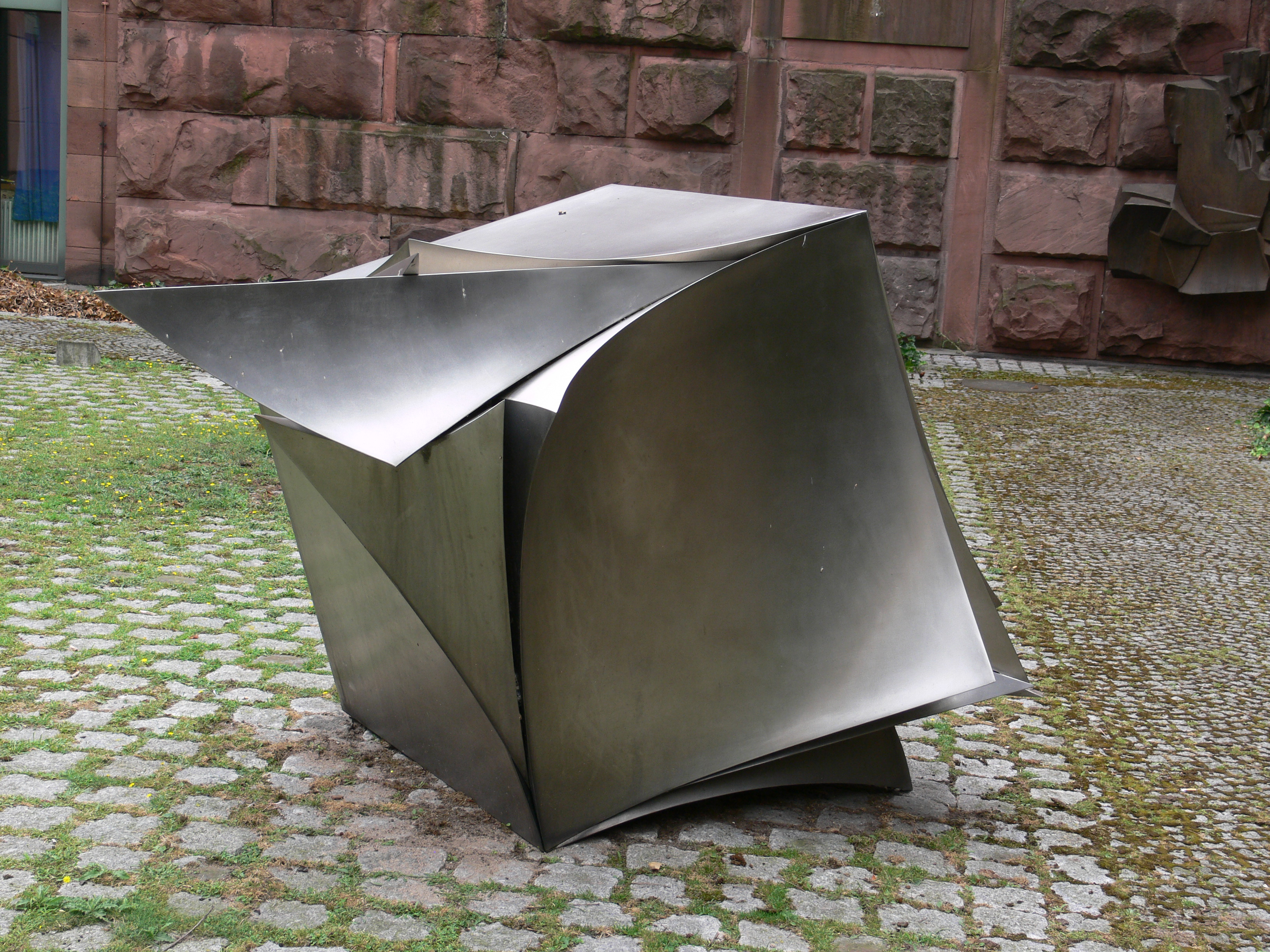
Skulpturengarten der Kunsthalle Mannheim

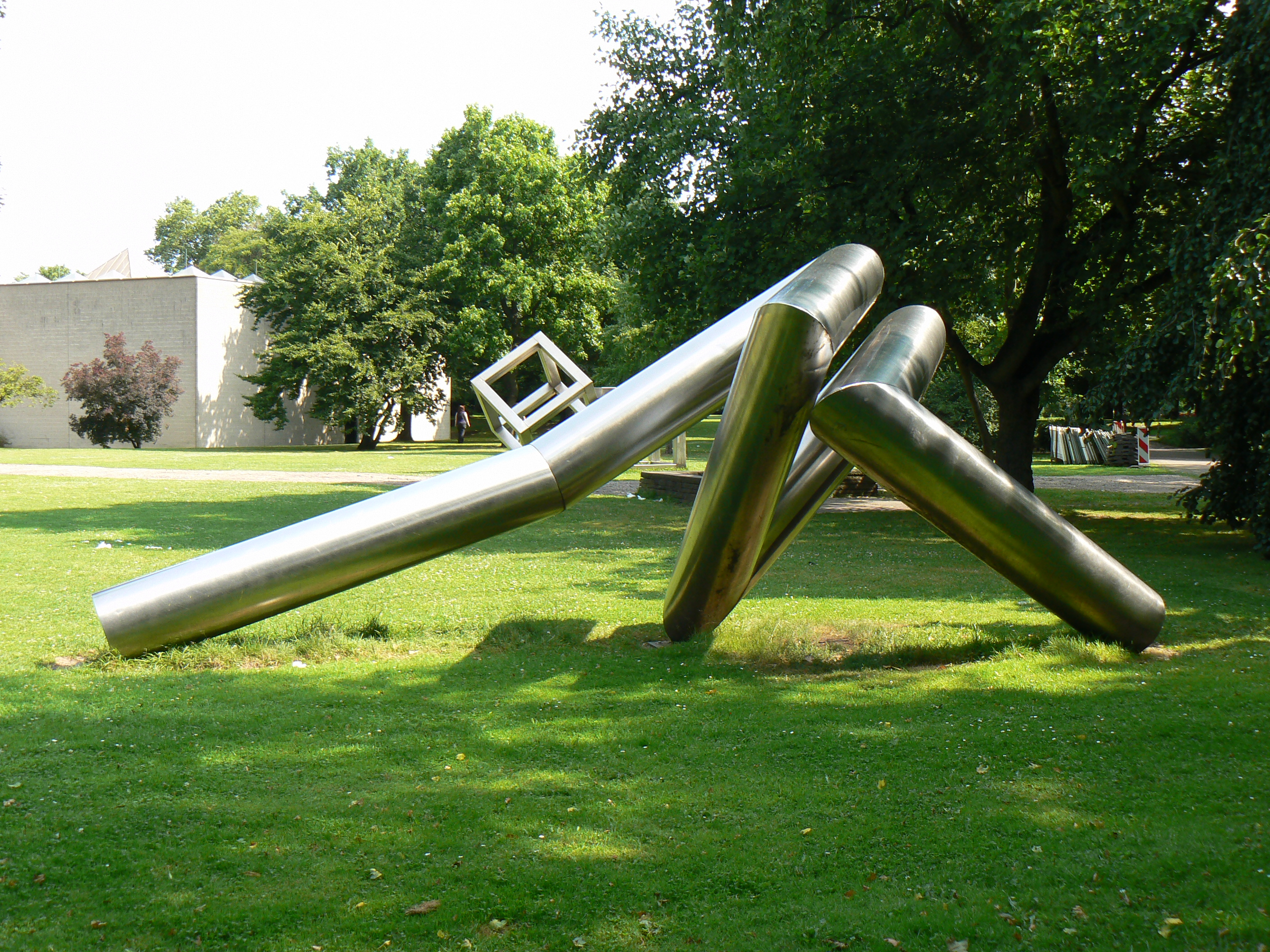
Duisburg

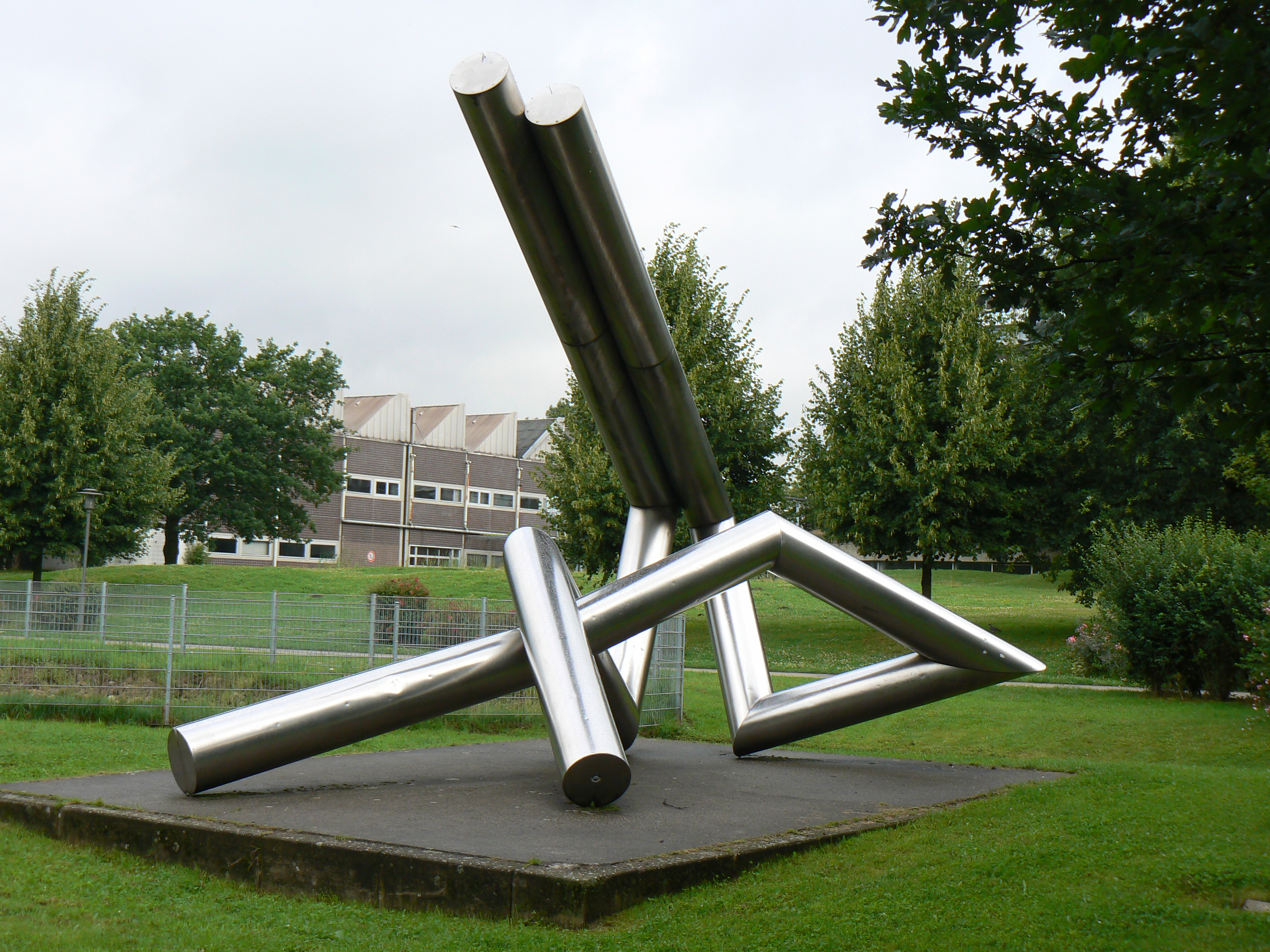
Gelsenkirchen, spatial pillars

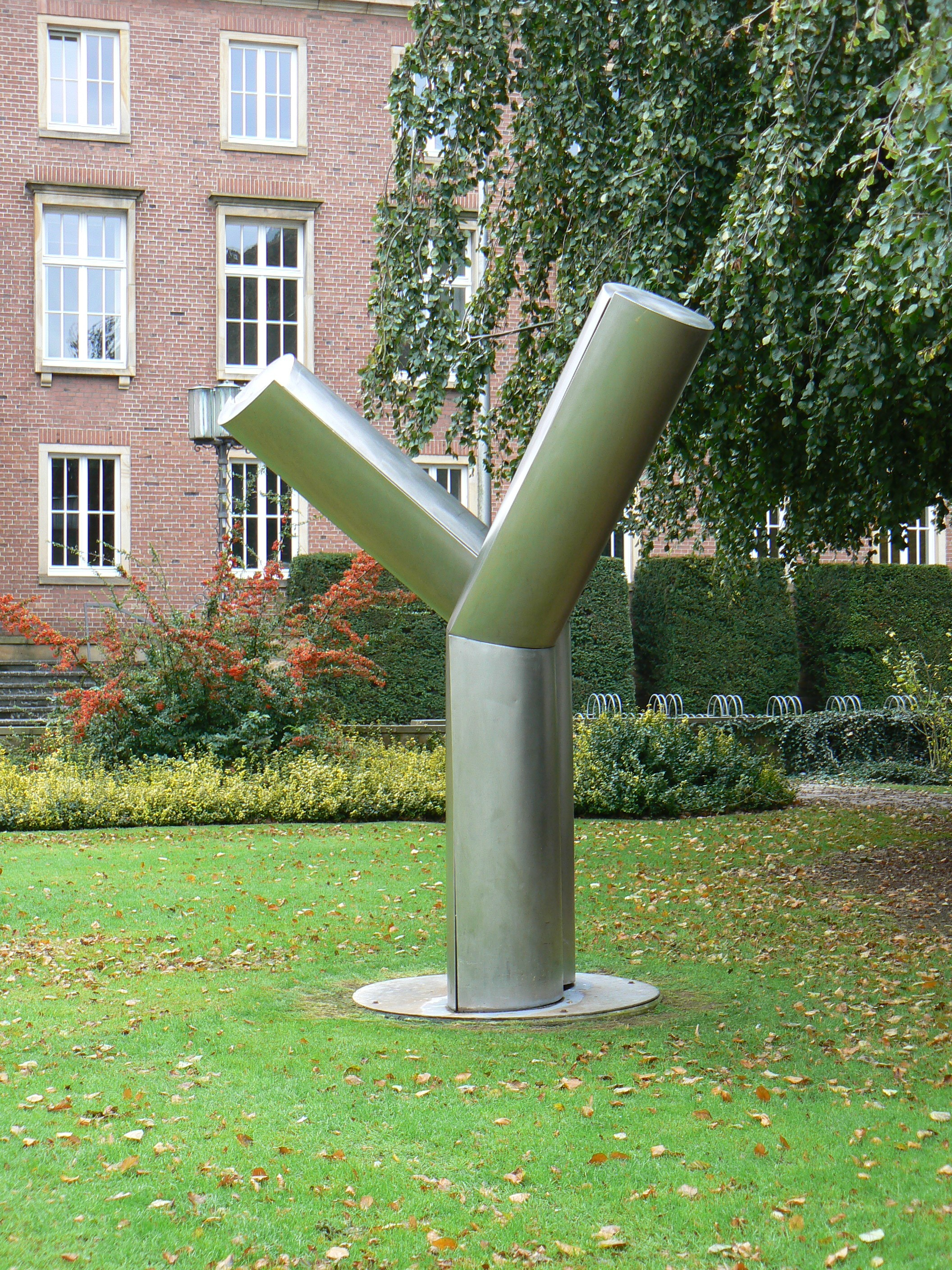
Nordhorn, double pillar

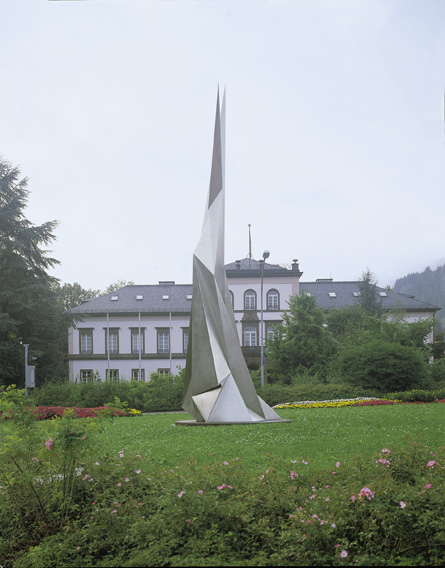
Schramberg 1990

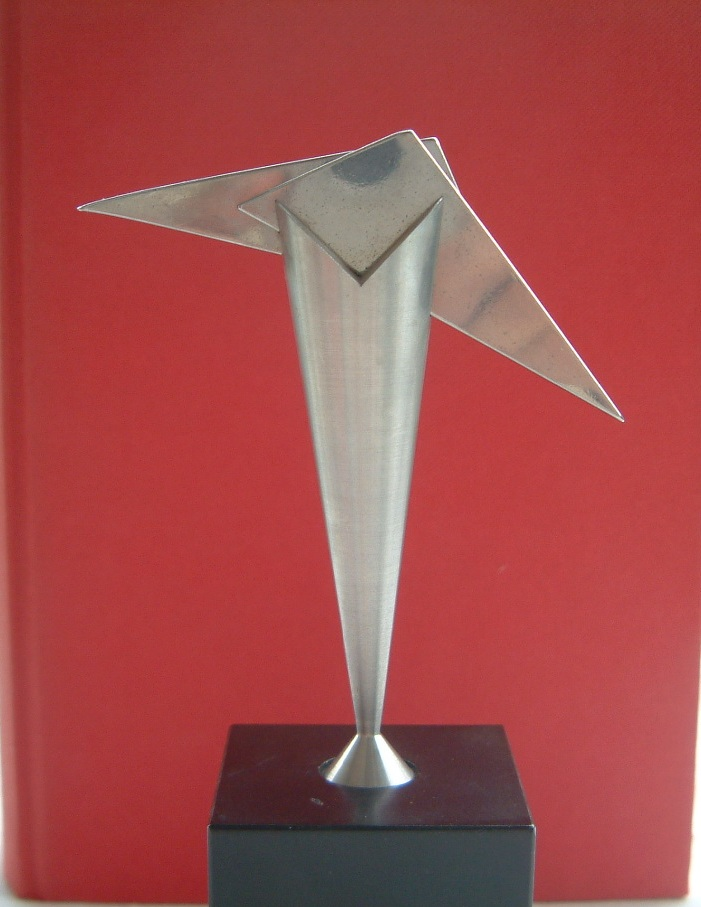
Bottle sealer, c. 1980

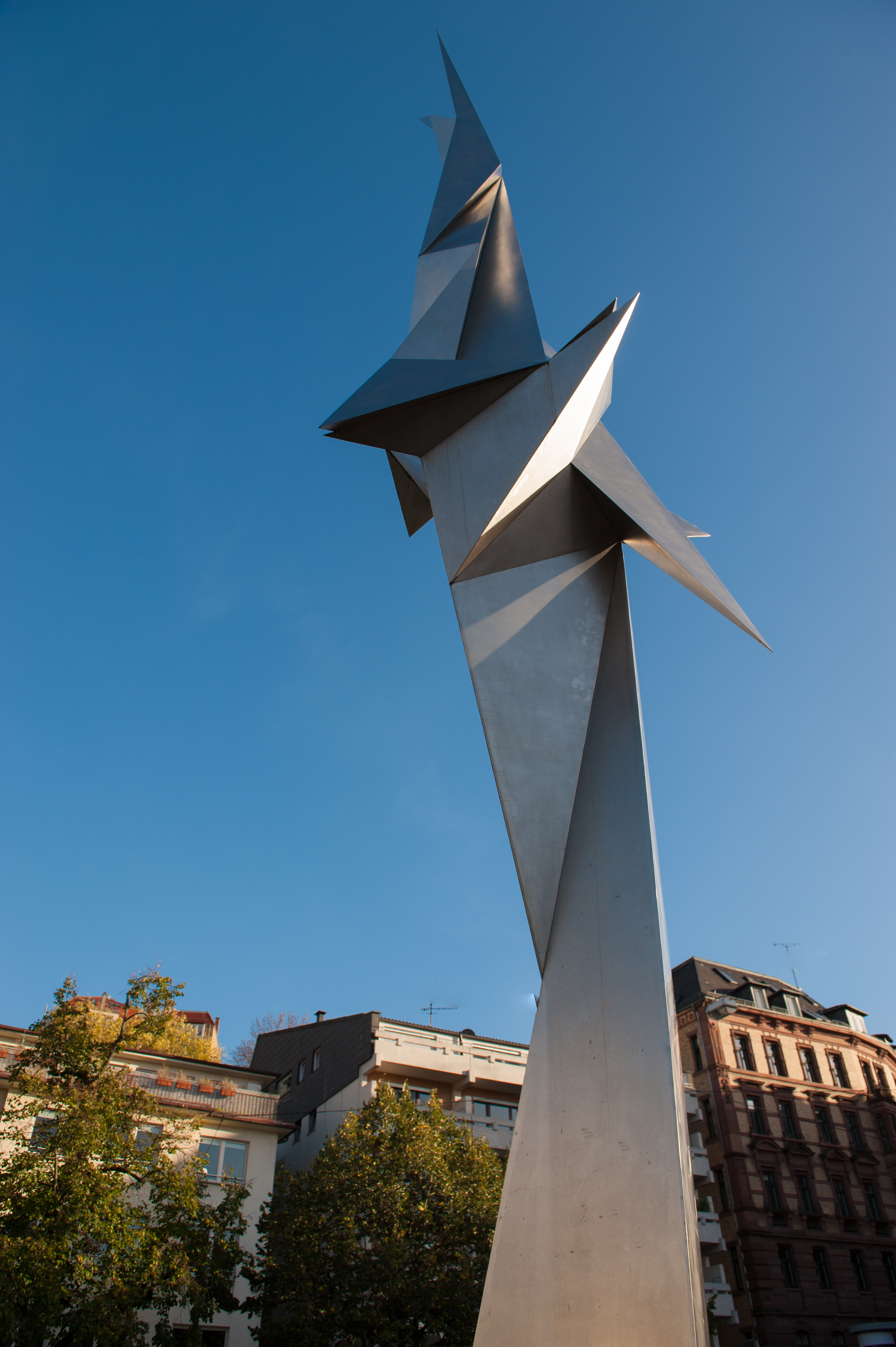
Steel sculpture, Kernerplatz, Stuttgart

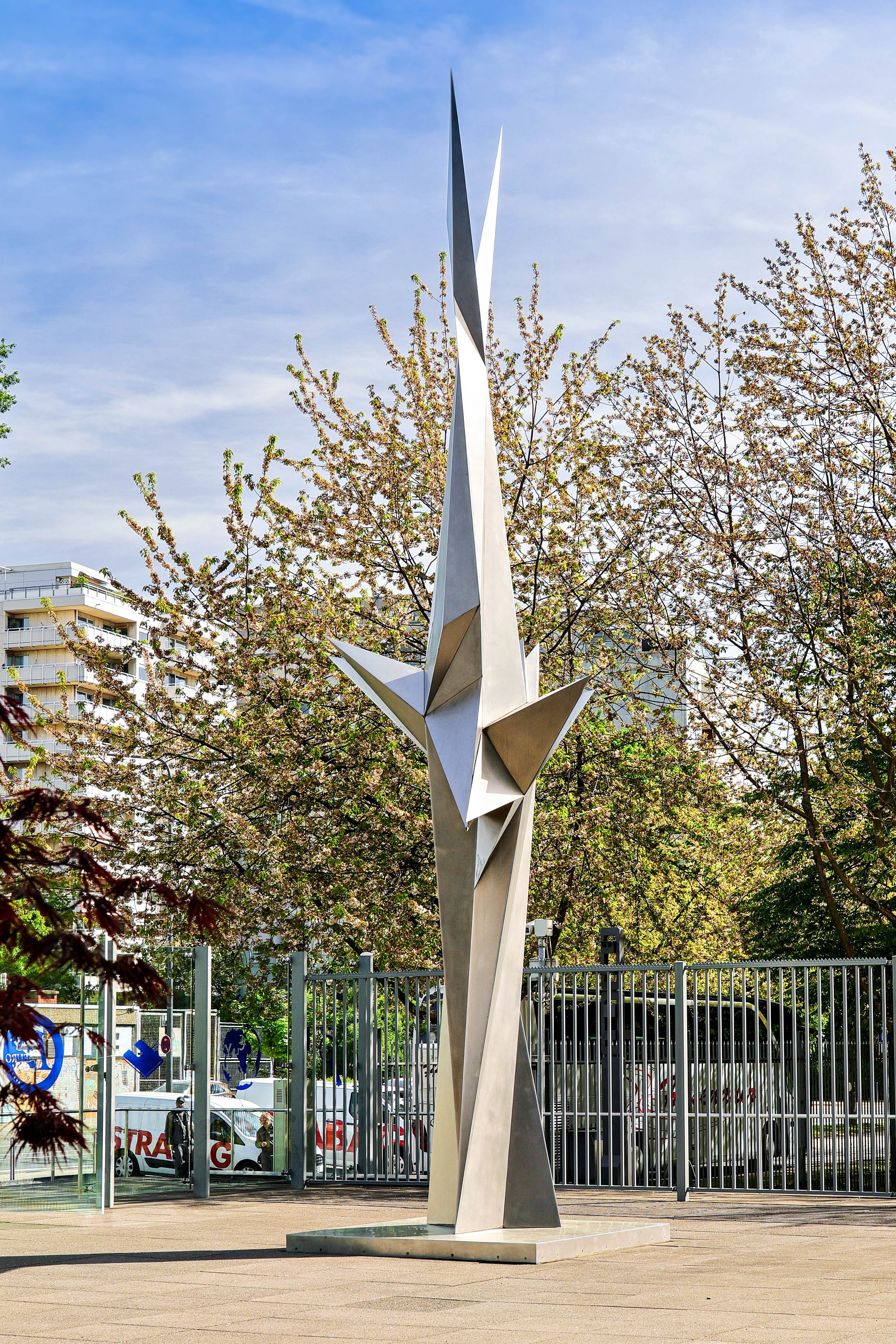
"4/96" steel sculpture in front of Money Museum Frankfurt
