= Heide Fasnacht =

American visual artist (born 1951)

- Born: 12 January 1951 (age 75); Cleveland, Ohio, United States
- Education: New York University, Rhode Island School of Design
- Known for: Sculpture, drawing, installation, painting
- Awards: Guggenheim Fellowship, Anonymous Was A Woman Award, Pollock-Krasner Foundation, Adolph and Esther Gottlieb Foundation, National Endowment for the Arts, Louis Comfort Tiffany Foundation
- Website: Heide Fasnacht

Heide Fasnacht (born 12 January 1951) is a New York City-based artist who works in sculpture, drawing, painting and installation art. Her work explores states of flux, instability and transformation caused by human action (architectural and cultural change, war, economics) and natural events (weather, geological processes). Since the mid-1990s, she has been known for sculptures and drawings that recreate momentary phenomena such as sneezes, geysers and demolitions—in sometimes abstract or cartoony form—that are temporally and spatially "frozen" for consideration of their aesthetic, perceptual, social or sensate qualities. In the late 2010s, she has expanded these themes in paintings that examine lost and neglected childhood sites, such as playgrounds and amusement parks. ARTnews critic Ken Shulman has described her work as "chart[ing] the fluid dialogue between second and third dimensions, motion and inertia, creation and ruin."

Heide Fasnacht, Demo, graphite powder in matte medium on neoprene and styrofoam, 112" x 125" x 120", 2000.

Fasnacht has been recognized with a Guggenheim Fellowship and awards from the Pollock-Krasner Foundation, Adolph and Esther Gottlieb Foundation, National Endowment for the Arts, and Anonymous Was A Woman, among others. Her work belongs to the permanent collections of institutions such as the Brooklyn Museum, Museum of Fine Arts, Boston, Philadelphia Museum of Art, and Walker Art Center.

== Work and reception ==
After receiving early recognition for her abstract sculpture in the 1980s, Fasnacht began creating stop-action-like sculpture and precise drawings of ephemeral, sudden or violent events in the mid-1990s, based on photographs from dated science textbooks and magazines. Critics connected them to work by Gerhard Richter, Sigmar Polke and Vija Celmins, but distinguished Fasnacht by her translation of two-dimensional sources into sculpture (rather than painting) that was "emphatically handmade" and open to fantasy, slippage of meaning, and abstraction.

Fasnacht's work plays with space, scale and time and in this sense relates to 1970s art that engaged in phenomenological explorations of experience, perception and objectivity. Nancy Princethal notes its focus on events that "fall at the threshold of visibility, in the realm of things that, while not imperceptible are more or less impossible to visualize in any stable, conventional way." Working at table-top to larger-than-human scale, Fasnacht has depicted cataclysmic events in miniature and minor experiences (e.g., sneezes) at great magnification, creating dissonances that lend moral ambiguity, paradox, and a sense of the absurd to her art. Her work's suspension of time converts moments of violence, loss or catharsis into objects of contemplation—of visual pleasure, danger, wonder, intellectual stimulation, foreboding or, paradoxically, humor—that Raphael Rubinstein described as "a kind of poetics of catastrophe." Her later paintings approach time differently, collapsing change and loss in the built environment across decades in single images.

=== Abstract sculpture (1977–1995) ===
Fasnacht initially worked within the materials and process-oriented language of Postminimalism, producing abstract, mixed-media wall reliefs that were also informed by Constructivist geometry and African art. They often consisted of built-up planes of raw, painted and distressed laminated wood in combinations of cones, ovals on tilted axes, globes or spirals that The New York Times described as bristling with energy, impulsive and balletic. In the later 1980s, she shifted to spiky, skeletal, machine-like freestanding works that critics related to the early modernist interest in circuses, sideshows and performance. Her early 1990s work signaled a turn to the human body, with slow, pensive objects made of rusted iron or sheets of thick rubber whose drooping forms conjured tongues (Terra Lingua, 1990) or peeling skin.

Heide Fasnacht, Jump Zone, vinyl tape, styrofoam, and neoprene, 180" x 204" x 180", 2008. Installed at the American Academy of Arts and Letters, New York City.

=== Photography-based work (1996– ) ===
Fasnacht broke from overtly abstract work around 1996 in transitional wall reliefs that used preexisting schematic renderings and photographs of star clusters or land masses as a point of departure (e.g., Strange Attractors, 1997). In subsequent sculpture and drawings, she borrowed from stop-action photographs of explosive forces involving wind, air, movement and space. Among the first was Little Sneeze (1997), a delicate sculpture with clumps of black and white polymer clotted around radiating vectors of wire, which issued from a wall. This work developed into larger works created by spraying neoprene through wire mesh that erupted from floors in a more unruly fashion: the graphite-coated Big Bang (1998) and Explosion (1998), which delineated different types of smoke in black, gray and white.

Two installation-like works from 2000 were later noted for their uncanny prophetic quality in light of the subsequent 9-11 attacks. Demo froze the implosion of a building in mid-air, complete with highly textured, blackened falling bricks and signage letters, flying shards and oozed neoprene smoke resembling popcorn; it references vanished 1950s landmarks from Fasnacht's native Midwest. The more violent and unsettling Exploding Plane offers a complex sense of space, drawing viewers' eyes into, around and through the work and its aluminum-gray scattering parts (including suitcases) suspended in midair. After 9/11, Fasnacht turned from explosions to more celebratory and meditative drawings of civic parades and fireworks, exploding champagne bottles, and water occurrences that suggested both mourning and renewal.

Between 2005 and 2008, Fasnacht created a series of perceptually challenging wall and floor drawings/installations executed in tape, which collapsed gallery and drawing spaces with anamorphic optical effects that read like dematerialized architectural renderings. The centerpiece of one show, Jump Zone (2005–8), occupied a corner, exploiting perspective and visual illusion to suggest a solid, three-dimensional object exploding outward with flying girders and popcorn-like smoke and detritus; ARTnews described it as a "masterly representation of anxiety and disorientation." Similar works include New City (2007), which featured three wall drawings of exploded, skeletal one-room buildings with studs, beams and partial sheathing visible, and Stack (2008, Smack Mellon), which extended off corner walls onto the gallery floor.

From 2008 to 2012, Fasnacht researched and examined the historic pilfering and destruction of artistic and cultural materials during times of war and authoritarian repression, from World War II to the Taliban’s destruction of the Bamiyan Buddhas. This work culminated in her show "Loot" (Kent Gallery, 2012), which featured black-and-white historical images of seized artifacts and personal effects, store rooms and rubble that she digitally altered and cut out, in formats from small framed pieces to wall-sized installations.

Heide Fasnacht, Turbulence, acrylic paint on manipulated photo mounted on wood panel, 48" x 60", 2019.

In later work, Fasnacht continued to explore architectural, geological and cultural instability. Suspect Terrain (2014–5) was a 50-foot-wide temporary installation commissioned for Socrates Sculpture Park, which derived from a photograph of a massive sinkhole that opened in Guangzhou, China. It was constructed out of jagged, centrifugally sloping plywood plates atop exposed struts, out of which a peaked-roofed house shaded with raster dots and surrounded by irregularly placed painted cracks appears to sink. Functioning like a low-tech playground or stage set, it provided spectators the visceral, unprescribed experience of safely traversing a natural disaster, while using plate tectonics as a means of questioning notions of stability, the reliability of appearances and perception. New Frontier (2015) and Sands Debris (2017-18) depicted the aftermaths of two Las Vegas hotel/casino demolitions, referencing material transformation and the volatility of boom economies and architecture.

=== Works on paper (1996– ) ===
Fasnacht has made consistently drawings alongside—rather than as preparation for—parallel sculpture and installation series. Her drawings have been noted for their refinement, drafting skill and varied mark-making, which can include crosshatching, newsprint-like rendered dots and actual holes, among other techniques. Critics have compared them to Impressionist landscapes or Agnes Martin grid paintings that metamorphose upon close inspection, the Pop-Conceptualist hybrids of Sigmar Polke, and the drawings of Alberto Giacometti, which render transient qualities as sculptural or stable. Her drawing series include: "REM" (1996–7), constellation-like graphite works based on eye-movement charts observed in viewers of famous paintings; the colored-pencil and graphite "Explosions/Implosions" (1997–2003); "The ERR Project" (2007–8), depicting looted artifacts in artist's tape and dry transfer textures on vellum; the graphite and colored-pencil "Book Burnings" (2009–13); and the colored-pencil and graphite "Casinos" and "Casino Countdowns" (2015–7), which depict Las Vegas demolition sites, fireworks and light shows.

=== Paintings (2018– ) ===
In 2018, Fasnacht returned to her first medium of painting, producing haunting, photo-based mixed-media works that explore changes to the built environment over time. Her "Dead Resorts" and "Lost Architecture" series (both 2018) featured buildings, malls, theme parks and bars that were collaged, drawn and painted on a range of surfaces (colored floor tiles, vinyl, wood, Polystyrene, cardboard) in lyrical or graphic, blueprint-like fashion.

Heide Fasnacht, Turbulence, acrylic paint on manipulated photo mounted on wood panel, 48" x 60", 2019.

The "Playgrounds & -topias" series (2019–20) focuses on the ghosts of rural or suburban, 1950s and 1960s sites of childhood play: swing sets, seesaws, rollercoasters and jungle gyms that explore memory and fallibility, possibility and danger, loss and "unclaimed reminiscences," according to Nancy Princenthal. The large, often nocturnal paintings retain Fasnacht's interest in the dissolution of matter and the kinetic; they convey a bodily sense of gravity-defying exhilaration modulated by nostalgia and melancholy, as well as disorientation created by distorted spaces that flip, roll and sometimes dissolve into the snow of old TV screens. Painted on grounds of digitally manipulated, tiled inkjet prints of Internet images, their surfaces are activated by layered passages of brushy paint, invented structural elements, and occasional, sketchy notional figures. Works such as Big Jungle Gym and Invertigo A and B offer scaffold-like, skeletal tangles of bars, ladders to nowhere and struts, while others present the spooling, elliptical shapes of rollercoasters (e.g., Turbulence or Alpen Geist).

== Education and career ==
Fasnacht was born in Cleveland, Ohio in 1951 and studied art at the Rhode Island School of Design and New York University. She began exhibiting regularly with her first solo show at PS1 in 1979, followed by others at the Cleveland Center for Contemporary Art, Vanderwoude-Tananbaum Gallery and Germans van Eck Gallery (both New York) in her first decade. She subsequently had solo exhibitions at the Bernard Toale Gallery (Boston, 1996–2007), Bill Maynes Gallery (1997–2000) and Kent Gallery (2003–12) in New York, Worcester Art Museum (2000) and Virginia Commonwealth University (2004, mid-career retrospective), among others. She has been featured in Documenta 6 and group exhibitions at the Museum of Modern Art, Whitney Museum at the Equitable Center, Aldrich Contemporary Art Museum and SculptureCenter. She has taught fine arts at Parsons the New School for Design since 1995 and been an instructor at UCLA, Princeton University, Harvard University and SUNY Purchase.

== Awards and collections ==
Fasnacht has received the Anonymous Was A Woman Award (2019), a Guggenheim Fellowship (1990), and awards from the Pollock-Krasner Foundation (2010, 1999), New York Foundation for the Arts (2007), Adolph and Esther Gottlieb Foundation (2001), National Endowment for the Arts (1994, 1990) and Louis Comfort Tiffany Foundation (1986), among others. She has been awarded artist residencies from organizations including MacDowell Colony, the Rockefeller Foundation (Bellagio), Isabella Stewart Gardner Museum, Edward F. Albee Foundation and Yaddo. Her work belongs to the permanent museum collections of the Brooklyn Museum, Museum of Fine Arts, Boston, Philadelphia Museum of Art, Walker Art Center, Aargauer Kunsthaus (Switzerland), Cincinnati Museum of Art, Columbus Museum of Art, Dallas Museum of Art, Fogg Art Museum, High Museum of Art, Museum Arnhem (Netherlands), Museum of Contemporary Art San Diego, Rose Art Museum, Santa Barbara Museum of Art, and Fundacio Sorigue (Spain), among others.
