= Wolfgang Weber (journalist) =

German journalist

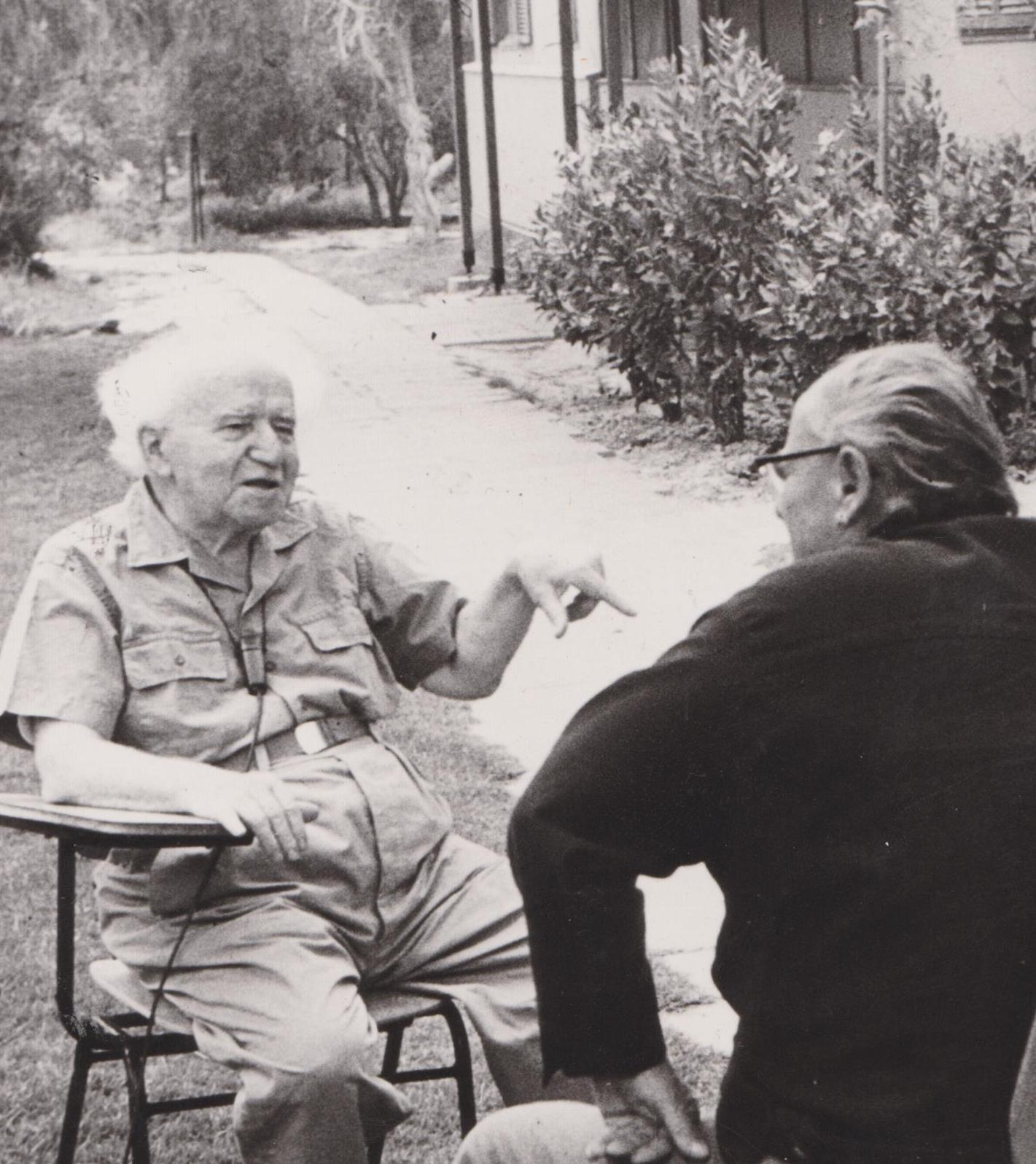
Wolfgang Weber interviews David Ben-Gurion 1972

Wolfgang Weber (17 June 1902 – 4 March 1985) was a German photojournalist and film producer.

== Life and work ==
Wolfgang Weber was born in Leipzig. His father, Friedrich Weber, was a wealthy factory owner who decided to quit business to follow his main interests in taking over the management of the Research Institute for Ethnology in Munich. There in his early years Weber was able to get to know numerous cultural assets from distant countries from his father's collection. He studied ethnology, philosophy and musicology in Munich, but also completed a training as a conductor at the Academy of Musical Art.

Erich von Hornborstel, professor at the Phonetic Institute of the Humboldt University in Berlin, appointed Weber as an assistant and sent him on a music-ethnographic research trip to East Africa to the tribe of the Wadjaggas on Kilimanjaro. In addition to the elaborate sound recording devices that work with wax rolls, with which he recorded the tribal songs, he also worked with a stereo camera. He published the photographic recordings in the Münchner Illustrierte Zeitung (MIZ) in 1925. This was the beginning of his career as a photojournalist.

Mainly he worked for the Berliner Illustrirte Zeitung and the MIZ, but published also – sometimes under synonyms – in several other papers, like “Die Dame” or “Vossische Zeitung”.

Alongside Felix H. Man, Erich Salomon, Martin Munkácsi and Alfred Eisenstaedt, Wolfgang Weber is considered a pioneer of modern photojournalism, as it was established in Germany around 1920. His subject area included reports on the social, political and economic situation at home and abroad, to the publication of which he also contributed the texts and the layout. From the first beginning, Weber was always looking for something unusual, foreign, strange ore new. In his pictures he always found the point, that expressed the theme best, so that no text was needed to understand the importance and feel the atmosphere. Often he used sequences to develop a story in pictures.

In 1928 his first book was published by Albertus Verlag in Berlin with more than 200 photographs for a portrait of Barcelona. In 1931 the Berliner Illustrierte Zeitung published the impressive sozial report “Dorf ohne Arbeit” (village without work) on the situation of German unemployed people in 1933 “The trial that the world is listening to” about the trial against van der Lubbe after the Reichstag fire, and in 1936 “The Olympic Stadium is filling up". But mainly he traveled around the world to Africa, Asia and the Middle East, and in 1943 and 1944 he documented the situation in various European countries. After World War II he was "the leading photo-journalist to have stayed in Germany" and became chief reporter of the Neue Illustrierte, at that time the leading German illustrated magazine. As one of the first German photojournalists he could work 1949 also in the USA. One of his outstanding reports was a comparison of everyday life in New York and Moscow photographed in the same week

After producing more than 900 reports over 40 years and approximately 3,000 published photographs, he began a new career in television reporting in the 1960s, continuing into the 1980s. He was among the few journalists permitted to film in China before, during, and after the Cultural Revolution under Mao Zedong. He documented the development of the Cabora Bassa dam over a period of more than 10 years, covering its social and political aspects and related issues. As a freelance journalist, he had access to several prominent political figures of the period and produced portraits of statesmen in the Middle East, including David Ben-Gurion and Yasser Arafat.

Although he had wife and two daughters in Cologne, he was traveling almost every day of his life. After his dead 1985 in Cologne nearly all his works with about 200,000 negatives, films and prints were sold to the Folkwang Museum in Essen. An exhibition of his life and works was held in this museum in 2004.

== Exhibitions ==
- 1977 Kassel: documenta 6, 150 Years of Photography
- 1982 Köln: Reisen ohne Ende – Fotos 1933 bis 1935 (Travels without End – Photos 1933 to 1935), Historical archive of the city of Cologne
- 1984 Barcelona: Barcelona 1928, Caixa de Barcelona
- 2004/2005 Essen: Wolfgang Weber’s Reports, photography and film from 1925 to 1977. His life and work in a special exhibition, Folkwang Museum
- Numerous participations in group exhibitions

== Publications ==
(only books)

- Barcelona. The face of the cities. Edited by Carl Otto Justh, Albertus Verlag, Berlin 1928.
- Hotel Affenbrotbaum (Hotel Baobabtree, adventure on the Cape – Cairo highway), Ullstein, Berlin 1936.
- Abenteuer einer Kamera (Adventure of a camera. Experiences of a picture hunter in Europe and Africa), Deutscher Verlag, Berlin 1938.
- Reisen ohne Ende Wolfgang Weber sieht die Welt (Travel without end. Wolfgang Weber sees the world), Brüder Auer Verlag, Bonn/Rheindorf 1952.
- Abenteuer meines Lebans (Adventure of my life), Kurt Desch, Vienna et al. 1960.
- Auf Abwegen um die Welt (Astray around the world), Sigbert Mohn Verlag, Gütersloh 1964
- Hinter den Kulissen des Fernsehens (Behind the scenes of television) Signal-Verlag, Baden-Baden 1975, ISBN 3-7971-0152-X and: Maier, Ravensburg 1980, ISBN 978-3-473-39597-2

== Literature ==
- Tom Allbeson: Photography, Reconstruction and the Cultural History of the Postwar European ... Routledge 2021 ISBN 978-1-4742-3496-2
- Cecil Beaton, Gail Buckland: The Magic Image. Genders of Photography 1939 to the Present Day. Weidenfeld & Nicolson, London und Boston 1975.
- Catalog for documenta 6. Volume 2: Photography, film, video. Kassel 1977, p. 110 ff. ISBN 3-920453-00-X
- Ute Eskildsen (Ed.): „Fliegen Sie sofort nach …“. Wolfgang Weber – Reportagen, Fotografie und Film 1925 bis 1977. Steidl, Göttingen 2004, ISBN 3-86521-098-8
- Tim N. Gidal: „Wolfgang Weber“ in "Deutschland: Beginn des modernen Fotojournalismus" (Germany: Beginning of modern photojournalism), Bucher Verlag Luzern und Frankfurt, 1972. p. 48 ff. ISBN 3-7658-0152-6
- Tim Gidal: Modern Photojournalism: Origin and Evolution, 1910–1933, translated by Maureen Oberli-Turner, published by Macmillan, Michigan 1973, ISBN 978-0-02-000400-4
- Kristina Grub: Wolfgang Weber. in: Lynne Warren (Ed.): Encyclopedia of Twentieth-Century Photography. 3-Volume Set. Routledge, New York 2006 p.1653 ff. ISBN 978-1-135-20543-0
- Anton Holzer: Picture Stories: The Rise of the Photoessay in the Weimar Republic, in International Journal for History, Culture and Modernity 2018: Picture Stories: the Rise of the Photoessay in the Weimar Republic
- Ian Jeffery: Photography: A Concise History, Oxford University Press, 1981 87 ISBN 978-0-500-20187-9
- Randy Kaufmann, Brigitte Werneburg: Der Ideenreichste (the most imaginativ), in: TAZ. 9. Februar 2005 Der Ideenreichste
- Daniel H. Magilow: The Photography of Crisis, Pennsylvania State University Press 2012 ISBN 978-0-271-05422-3
- Karl Ruhrberg: Art of the 20th Century. Taschen 2000, p. 666. ISBN 978-3-8228-5907-0
