= Gabriele Nothhelfer =

German photographer

Gabriele Nothhelfer (born 1945) is a German photographer. Nothhelfer was born in Berlin.

Her work is included in the collections of the San Francisco Museum of Modern Art, the Museum of Modern Art, New York, the Centre Pompidou, Paris, and the Museum of Fine Arts Houston.

== Life and work ==
Gabriele and Helmut Nothhelfer were trained together at the Lette School in Berlin (photography department) from 1967 to 1969. This was followed by a period of study at the Folkwangschule für Gestaltung in Essen with Otto Steinert from 1969 to 1970. Gabriele Nothhelfer worked as a scientific-technical photographer at the Institute of Land and Sea Transport (Department of Motor Vehicles) at Technische Universität Berlin from 1972 to 2006, and Helmut Nothhelfer was a scientific-technical photographer at the Dental Clinic of the Free University of Berlin from 1971 to 2006. The couple married in 1973.
