= Hannsjörg Voth =

German artist

Hannsjörg Voth is a German artist. His works in monumental form include Himmelstreppe, Goldene Spirale, and Stadt des Orion in the Plaine de Marha in Drâa-Tafilalet, Morocco. His art was part of the exhibition “Future Bodies from a Recent Past—Sculpture, Technology, and the Body since the 1950s” at Museum Brandhorst.

== Land art ==
Voth is internationally known member of the land art movement. Land art is built with natural materials and in nature. Land art is supposed to be subject to natural processes such as deterioration. Between 1980 and 2003 Voth built three structures in Morocco. The Stairway to Heaven in 1987, the Golden Spiral in 1997, and the City of Orion in 2003. The structures are open to the public by day and the travel company Epic Travel has been granted the exclusive permission from Voth's foundation for luxury overnight camps.
