= John Hilliard (artist) =

English artist

John Hilliard (born 1945) is an English conceptual artist. Hilliard's ongoing body of work addresses the specificity of photography as a medium: its uncertainty as a representational device and its status within the visual arts, especially in relation to painting, cinema and commercial photography.

== Education ==
Born in Lancaster, Hilliard studied at Lancaster College of Art from 1962 to 1964, and then at Saint Martin's School of Art, London, until 1967. He began his interest in photography as an art student in the 1960s, first using the camera simply to capture images of his site-specific art installations. Soon, he recognised there was bias inherent in photography—the camera could not be completely neutral—and he explored the manipulation of the photographic process and its results.

== Art and reception ==
In the 1970s, Hilliard examined how changes to the process of black and white photography could affect the outcome. His art showed how the camera's notional objectivity was vulnerable to decisions made by the photographer leading up to the instant of the exposure, as well as subsequent decisions made in the darkroom concerning paper selection and development techniques.

Hilliard's 1971 work, Camera Recording Its Own Condition consisted of a display of 70 snapshots taken by a camera aimed at a mirror, showing itself at the moment of exposure, the snapshots differing by film speed, exposure time, and aperture size. The 70 images were laid out in a rigid grid with one optimal "correct" image in the center. This changing of the mechanics of each shot revealed the intention of the unseen photographer. In 1974, Hilliard showed in Cause of Death four images of the same human body covered in a sheet. The images were taken from the same photographic negative but each one suggested a different cause of death, accomplished by cropping the print to modify context. Each image was given its own one-word title to indicate a narrative: "Crushed", "Drowned", "Burned", and "Fell". Photographer Chris Steele-Perkins wrote that, in Cause of Death, "framing affects the way a photograph is read", and that Hilliard provides the viewer with "elegant forensic evidence that, although the camera cannot lie, photographs tell different truths." University of Ulster photography professor Terence Wright noted that Cause of Death is a formalist piece in which the process is revealed, and that many of Hilliard's works fall into this classification.

In the 1980s colour photography in popular culture became the subject of Hilliard's semiotic scrutiny. He was especially interested in how photography targeted a desired result in advertising and media. He challenged the viewer to re-examine an Asian woman's portrait in East/West, 1986, showing how the stylised profile can be manipulated to represent different cultural attitudes. In response to a 1989 show, Chicago Tribune art critic Alan G. Artner wrote that Hilliard purposely clouds the difference between painting and photography, and that he "dramatize[s] issues specific to the photographic medium."

In the 1990s Hilliard's work evolved a stronger chroma, push processing, saturation, and seductive gloss, the subjects arranged to portray a narrative that was perhaps violent or erotic. At the same time, the viewer is prevented from complete comprehension of context by interposed objects obscuring portions of the scene. For instance his work Miss Tracy, 1994 shows what is assumed to be a nude woman face down on a bloody sheet, the center of the image blocked by a large rectangle leaving the peripheral region as the only source of understanding. In the mid-1990s Hilliard further expanded the scale of his photographic works by printing on canvas or vinyl, the size approaching that of a mural. He continued to present the viewer with a disruption of full understanding, a critical comment on the viewing process.

== Exhibits ==
From Christmas 1983 to mid-June 1984, Hilliard's art was shown in Germany at the Kölnischer Kunstverein, the Kunsthalle Bremen, and the Frankfurter Kunstverein. Art historian and critic Jean Fisher wrote a biographical piece and analysed the works for a 69-page museum book edited by art historian and publisher Peter Weiermair.

In early 1989, an exhibit of Hilliard's large scale works was featured for one month at Chicago's Renaissance Society museum. The works consisted of large Cibachrome and Scanachrome prints, the latter being saturated colour applied to canvas using dyes. A 30-page book on Hilliard's work to date was printed for the event, with 19 images by Hilliard, and critical art analysis written by Fisher.

In 1999, a major retrospective of Hilliard's works was mounted, and shown in three German art galleries.

In 2003, German publisher Verlag das Wunderhorn published a monograph of his works, entitled The Less Said The Better, with an accompanying solo exhibit in Amsterdam.

== Educator ==
Hilliard taught for a time at Camberwell School of Arts and Crafts. He was later associated with the Slade School of Fine Art, University College London, serving as professor, the head of Graduate Fine Art Media, the director of Graduate Programmes, and a tutor of graduate students. Currently, Hilliard lives and works in London.

== Publications ==
- Hilliard, John; Wooldridge, Duncan (2026). Written Down / Written Up. Selected Writings of John Hilliard. London: MACK. ISBN 978-1-917651-77-6.
- Hilliard, John; Campany, David (2015). John Hilliard: accident and design. Translated by Geyer, Bernhard; Weidner, Carolin (First ed.). Berlin Paris: Galerie Max Hetzler. ISBN 978-3-935567-84-8.
- Hilliard, John (2014). Wooldridge, Duncan (ed.). John Hilliard: not black and white ; abstraction and the monochrome in the work of John Hilliard. London: Ridinghouse. ISBN 978-1-905464-93-7.
- Hilliard, John (1984). John Hilliard: new works 1981 to 1983. Kettle's Yard Gallery. Cambridge: Kettle's Yard Gallery. ISBN 978-0-907074-20-5. OCLC 12200369.
