= Ursula Schultze-Bluhm =

German outsider artist

- Born: 17 November 1921
- Died: 9 April 1999 (aged 77); Cologne, Germany
- Occupation: painter
- Known for: Outsider art
- Notable work: Sydney Biennial (1979)
- Spouse: Bernard Schultze (m. 1955)

Ursula Schultze-Bluhm (17 November 1921 – 9 April 1999), also known as Ursula, was a German painter.

In 1979 she was part of the Sydney Biennial.

Representative of Outsider art, her work is included in the collections of the Fine Arts Museums of San Francisco, the Museum Ludwig, Cologne and the Museum Fur Moderne Kunst in Frankfurt, Germany.

Ursula Schultze-Bluhm died in Cologne in 1999.

== Personal life ==
She married Bernard Schultze in 1955. They lived and worked in Cologne from 1968.
