= Bernard Schultze =

German painter

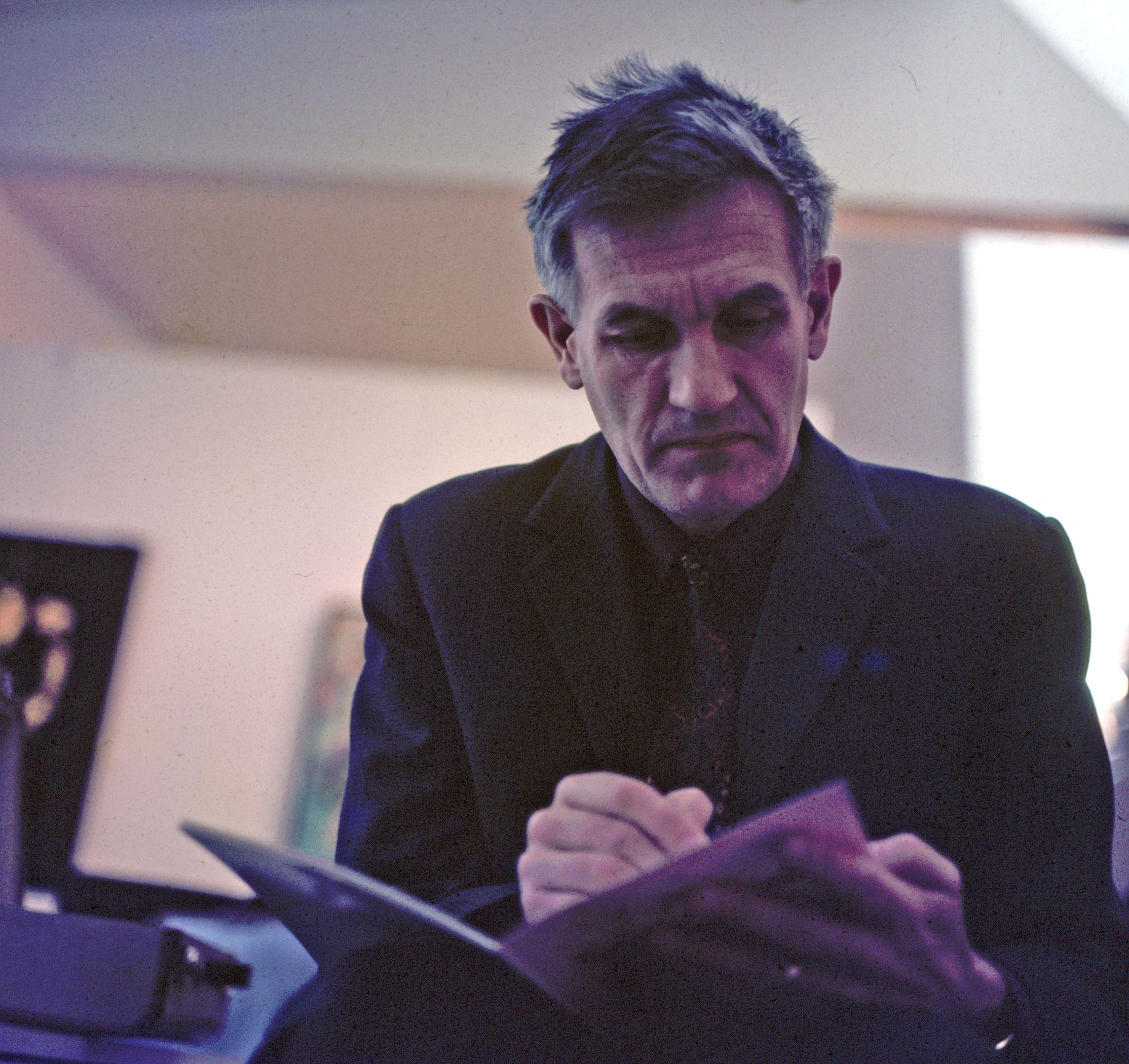

Bernard Schultze (31 May 1915 in Schneidemühl, now Piła, Poland – 14 April 2005 in Cologne) was a German abstract painter who co-founded the Quadriga group of artists along with Karl Otto Götz and two other artists. On 7 July 1955 he married another painter named Ursula Bluhm.

Characterized by their gestural abstraction, Schultze's works regularly feature brilliant, fluorescent colors morphing in and out of implied representation, forming fantastical landscapes, figures, and languages.

Schultze's earlier works, produced before 1945, were destroyed as a result of a 1945 air raid on Berlin.

His work is included in the collections of the Museum Ludwig in Cologne, Germany, the Tate Museum, London, as well as the Museum of Modern Art, New York.

His paintings are also part of the art collection of the Hammerschmidt Villa in Bonn, Germany (the residence of the President of Germany until the mid-1990s).
