= Gallery wrap =

Canvas stretching method

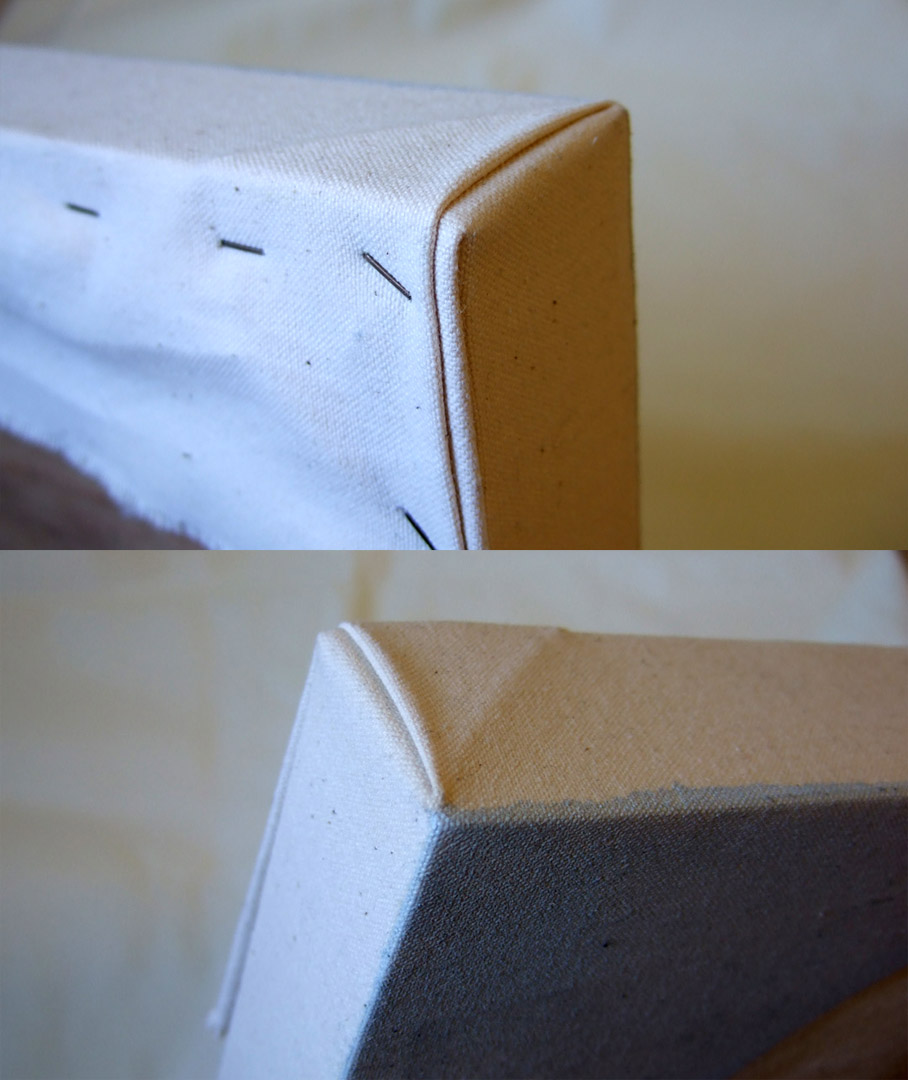
The back and front treatment of a canvas mounted in the gallery wrap style.

Gallery wrap is a method of stretching an artist's canvas so that the canvas wraps around the sides of the stretcher bar or strainer bars and is secured to the back of the wooden frame.

== Structure ==
The frame is usually 1.25" (approx. 4 cm) thick. As a result, the hardware (staples or tacks) used to secure the canvas are not visible. The sides of the canvas are prepared and primed in the same manner as the face or front. They may then be painted a solid color (usually white) or painted to continue the image appearing on the face. This method of stretching and preparing a canvas allows for a frameless presentation of the finished painting or photograph. In some competitions it is considered "framed" and ready to hang.

== Terminology ==
In canvas printing, the term "gallery wrap" refers to an image that appears on the sides of the frame as well as the front. The image on the sides is either a continuation or a reflection of the main image, or an otherwise fabricated element such as a solid color or colors derived from the adjacent image.

Gallery wrap is a very popular way to display art. However, because the edges of the canvas are wrapped over the thick bars, approximately two inches of the image (top, bottom, and sides) are not visible from the front. If the subject of an image or painting is sized and positioned correctly, the image will not be negatively affected. However, in some situations photo editing techniques are employed to fabricate additional image/material or to mirror existing content on the wrapped edges. Solid colours can also be used on the wrapped edges.

Gallery wrap production can be digitally automated with a Photoshop plugin or raster graphics editor.

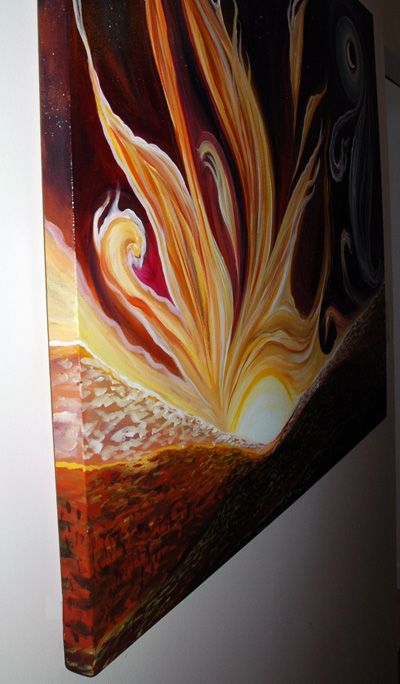
Painting on a gallery-wrapped canvas

== Gallery wrap versus non-gallery wrap ==
Gallery wrap is a method of displaying art wrapped over thick wooden bars so that there are no visible fasteners (such as staples or tacks). This method of stretching and preparing a canvas allows for a frame-less presentation of the finished painting.

In contrast, a non-gallery wrap canvas is usually intended to be framed before presentation. The stretcher bars are often thinner, and the canvas can be secured at the sides with staples or tacks as the frame will hide them. However, thin stretcher bars can be found "gallery wrapped" as a hangable work without a frame.

== See also ==
- Shaped canvas
- Stretcher bar
