= Charles Hinman =

American painter and sculptor (1932–2026)

Charles Hinman

Charles Baldwin Hinman (December 29, 1932 – May 29, 2026) was an American abstract minimalist painter, notable for creating three-dimensional shaped canvas paintings in the mid-1960s.

== Early life and education ==
Charles Hinman was born in Syracuse, New York, on December 29, 1932. His father, Donald "Don" Hinman, was a loan officer and bookkeeper, and his mother Grace Hinman was a homemaker. He had one older brother, Don Jr. He initiated his artistic education at the Syracuse Museum of Fine Arts, now the Everson Museum of Art, where he attended classes. He went on to complete his BFA in 1955 at Syracuse University. Alongside his artistic talent, Hinman was also dedicated to sports. While studying at university, he was a professional baseball player for the Milwaukee Braves in the minor leagues. He moved to New York City to study at the Arts Student League, before serving two years in the U.S. army. Upon his return, he was a mechanical drawing teacher at the Staten Island Academy, from 1960 to 1962, and a carpentry shop instructor at the Woodmere Academy on Long Island.

== New York art scene ==
In the early 1960s, Hinman lived on Coenties Slip in Lower Manhattan, where he shared an abandoned sail-making loft with James Rosenquist. It was an ideal art studio, offering large open spaces to work at an affordable rent. Along with Robert Indiana, Ellsworth Kelly, Jack Youngerman, and Agnes Martin, who resided in the neighboring buildings, they formed a small artistic community away from the Upper-East side and the abstract expressionists from whom they wished to differentiate themselves. They did not constitute an art movement as such, but rather a "support and critique family that helped each other go on their individual paths." Throughout the 1960s, they produced works that prefigured pop, minimal, and feminist art. In 1965, Hinman and Robert Indiana left Coenties Slip for the Bowery, where they shared a building at 2 Spring Street. In 1971, he moved a block away on the Bowery, where he settled in an 8000 sq/ft studio. Below Hinman's studio was that of Tom Wesselmann and above worked Will Insley, across the street were the studios of Adolph Gottlieb and Roy Lichtenstein. In 2002, the New Museum became his neighbor when it was built on the adjacent lot.

== Shaped canvas ==
In the 1960s, Hinman played a significant role in redefining the physical shape of paintings. The shaped canvas was born from the desire to break away from the traditional square or rectangular frame of painting. Rather than a formalized medium or window that contained the subject, the contours of the painting became part of the subject itself. In the mid-1960s, several abstract minimalist painters were experimenting with its possibilities, the most famous of whom is Frank Stella. Hinman drove the concept further by pushing the canvas out from the wall; his works were a form of hybrid between painting and sculpture. This type of painting is known as a three-dimensional shaped canvas. As early as 1963–64, Hinman created sculptural paintings with protruding geometric and undulating forms. While Sven Lukin and Richard Smith were also experimenting with the use of the three-dimensional canvas around the same time, Hinman's defining particularity was his focus on the illusion of space and subtly suggested volume, embracing the use of color, shadow, and reflection. He was influenced by Ellsworth Kelly in his flat and contrasting Hard-edge use of color but with the objective of generating and accentuating a perception of volume. In the subsequent years until the early 1970s, Hinman examined the possibilities offered by this new medium: strongly protruding canvases, geometric and sensual profiles, color contrasts, color reflections on the adjacent wall, shadows, and monochrome canvases.

== Early recognition ==
It was through James Rosenquist, that Hinman caught the attention of prominent New York gallery owners and museum directors who visited the studio they shared. Two exhibitions in 1964–65 introduced Hinman's work to the grand public and to critical attention; "Seven New Artists" at the Sidney Janis Gallery and a solo exhibition at the Richard Feigen Gallery. In 1965, Frank Stella and Henry Geldzahler included Hinman's work in their group show Shape and Structure at Tibor de Nagy, alongside Donald Judd, Larry Bell, Sol LeWitt, Carl Andre, and Will Insley. His work was shown at the Whitney Museum's landmark show Young America 1965 and the following year in United States 1670-1966. Hinman was represented by Richard Feigen who showed his work at his New York and Chicago galleries. While major museums such as the MOMA, the Whitney Museum, and the Albright–Knox Art Gallery soon bought his work for their permanent collections, his paintings also found a home in the collection of Nelson Rockefeller. From 1971 to 1973 the Parisian gallerist Denise René showed his work at her Paris and New York galleries.

== Artistic concepts ==
=== Process ===
Throughout his career, Hinman developed a methodical process via which he created his works. First, he made sketches of the final shape he wished to create. He then designed a minute blueprint of the frameworks he needed to construct to achieve this shape, comprising all the angles and lengths of the frame. His works are often composed of a juxtaposition of shaped canvases, which he bolted together into an integral form. He added the third dimension to his paintings by fixing protuberant forms to the underpinnings. These shapes push the canvas out from the wall and create the volume in his paintings. He then painted various planes of his work in order to create volume and to play with the eye of the viewer. He sometimes painted the reverse side of the canvas which sits off the wall, so as to produce a halo effect around his work. The use of light and shadows as well as contrasting colors and reflections play an important role in his creations.

=== 6 dimensions ===
Hinman's work focuses on the perception of volume as opposed to literal space. He used an array of techniques to create volume in the eye of the viewer. It is a form of trompe-l'œil that constantly evolves depending on the spectator's vantage point. Hinman described his concept as "My concept of my work is dynamic---never static. I think of my paintings as occupying a 6-dimensionnal space(…) the three dimensions of space and one each of time, light and color." According to him, space and time imply movement and the change of light: "As light moves across the object, the forms and the color appear to change with the rearrangement of the shadows. (…)The brightness causes a surface to move forward—the darkness causes the surface to recede. Further, the choice of adjacent colors causes a sensation of motion of the surfaces".

=== Series ===
Throughout his career, Hinman continuously created works in series. His early works from the mid-1960s are voluptuous and organic with strongly contrasting hard-edge colors and projecting forms. He then moved to a two-dimensional, minimalist and geometric style in the early 1970s. By the late 1970s he was exploring the potential of arched "double curved" profiles to shape his canvases. These structures became increasingly complex throughout the 1980s, reaching for scale and color in leaf-like arrangements.

From 2000 on, he has returned to a pure and minimal style working with light as much as with color. "A single facet or canvas may have its own color, or the shadow across it may serve as color (…) Sometimes the color solely belongs to the edge of a work, or so it seems, until one notices that Hinman has painted the back (…) He is not just shaping an object, but also taking it out from the wall."

== The Shaped Canvas revisited ==
In 1964, the Guggenheim Museum organised the show The Shaped Canvas. Laurence Alloway, the curator of the exhibition decided to focus on two-dimensional Minimal works only, de facto excluding three dimensional as well as Pop art works from this movement. This initial selection has been questioned and broadened over the years by several retrospective group shows that hosted a wider variety of shaped canvases. Frank Stella's 1965 group show Shape and Structure immediately refuted Olloway's position by including Hinman's paintings. In 1979, The School of Visual Arts Museum in New York organised a show named "Shaped Paintings". It opened the scope of the shaped canvas to Pop Art works as well as to three-dimensional shaped canvases. Hinman's work was presented alongside that of Kenneth Noland, Ellsworth Kelly, Robert Mangold, Bernar Venet, and Tom Wesselmann. In 2014, Hinman was included in the group show "Shaped Canvas Revisited" at the Luxembourg and Dayan Gallery in New York. This exhibition, which celebrated the fifty years of the original Guggenheim show, placed Hinman among the fathers of the shaped canvas movement alongside artists such as Lucio Fontana, Kenneth Noland, Frank Stella, and Tom Wesselmann.

== Reception ==
In later years, Hinman's work garnered increasing attention both for his contemporary as for his "modern" (historic) works. According to some critics, his most recent series of "Gems" and "Black Paintings" are arguably among his most interesting works. In 2013, the Marc Straus Gallery in New York organized a retrospective covering the six decades of his career.

From 2017 on, Hinman and now his estate has been exclusively represented by Westwood Gallery NYC, which has organized several of the artist's late-career exhibitions, including Charles Hinman: Shaped Paintings (2017), Chromatic Eclipse (2019), On the Bowery, Part 2: Structural Abstraction (2021), Beyond Minimalism (2023), and Charles Hinman: Paper Matters, 1980s (2025). At the time of his death, Hinman's work was on exhibit at Westwood Gallery NYC in Artists on the Bowery, Part 6: Reframing the Edge (May 28 – August 1, 2026).

== Death ==
Charles Hinman died in Raleigh, North Carolina, on May 29, 2026, at the age of 93. He was survived by his children, Delphine and Theodore, as well as the children of his late wife (Jan Bireline), Alexandria, Marek, and Lise.

As co-trustee of the Charles Hinman Artwork Trust, Westwood Gallery NYC is the administrator of the Hinman archive and catalogue raisonné.

== Documentaries and videos ==
- "The Art of Charles Hinman", Vimeo.com, Adam Ben Cohen
- "In the Studio with Charles Hinman", Vimeo.com, Ghostly International, Will Calcutt
- "Charles Hinman", Vimeo.com, Thomas Auriol

== Selected institutional collections ==
- Museum of Modern Art, New York, NY, USA
- Whitney Museum of American Art, New York, NY, USA
- Los Angeles County Museum, Los Angeles, CA, USA
- Hirshhorn Museum, Washington, DC, USA
- Musee' des Beaux Arts de l'Ontario, Toronto, Ontario, Canada
- Tel Aviv Museum, Tel Aviv, Israel
- Albright Knox Art Gallery, Buffalo, NY, USA

== Selected corporate collections ==
- Chase Manhattan Bank, New York, NY, USA
- The Rockefeller Collection, New York, NY, USA

== Selected awards and honors ==
- Guggenheim Fellowship
- Pollock-Krasner Foundation Grant
- Lee Krasner Award
