= Strainer bar =

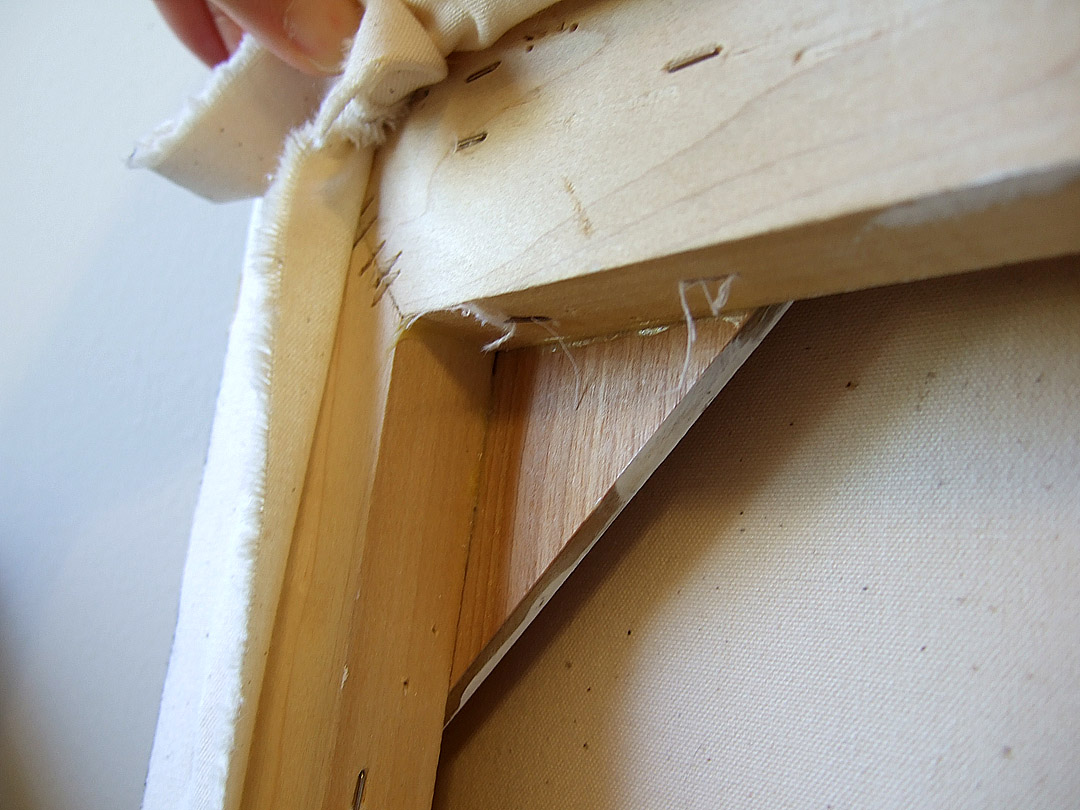
Backside view of a strainer frame displaying corner construction.

A strainer bar is used to construct a wooden stretcher frame used by artists to mount their canvases. They are traditionally a wooden framework support on which an artist fastens a piece of canvas. They are also used for small-scale embroidery to provide steady tension, affixing the edges of the fabric with push-pins or a staple gun before beginning to sew, and then removing it from the frame when the work is complete. Strainer bar frames are usually in the shape of a rectangle, although shaped canvases are also possible.

A stretcher frame constructed from strainer bars should not be confused with one constructed from stretcher bars. Strainer bars are fixed to one another with wood glue, nails or staples, often in conjunction. Strainer bar frames are often reinforced with other fixed elements such as corner and cross braces. These frames are not built to accommodate the insertion of tightening keys into their corners to further tighten the canvas stretched upon them as a stretcher bar frame would.
