= Stretcher bar =

Wooden frame to hold canvas taut, as for a painting surface

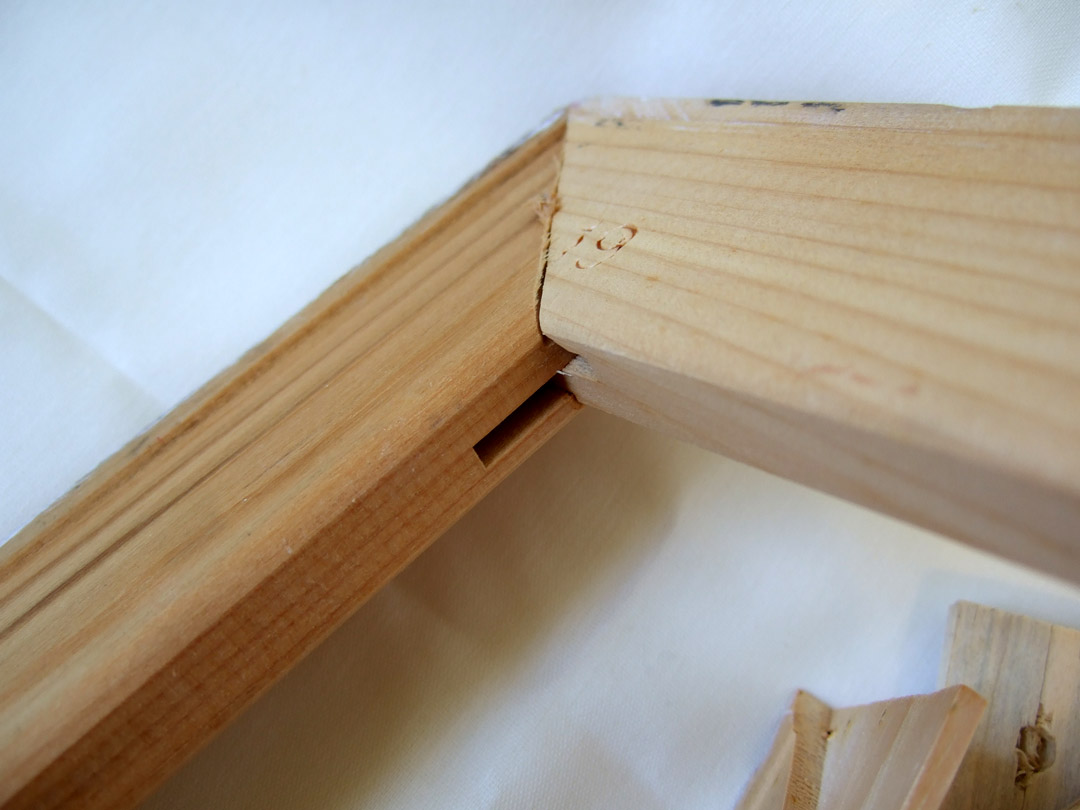
Interior angle of a completed stretcher bar corner showing the slot designed to fit a Corner key.

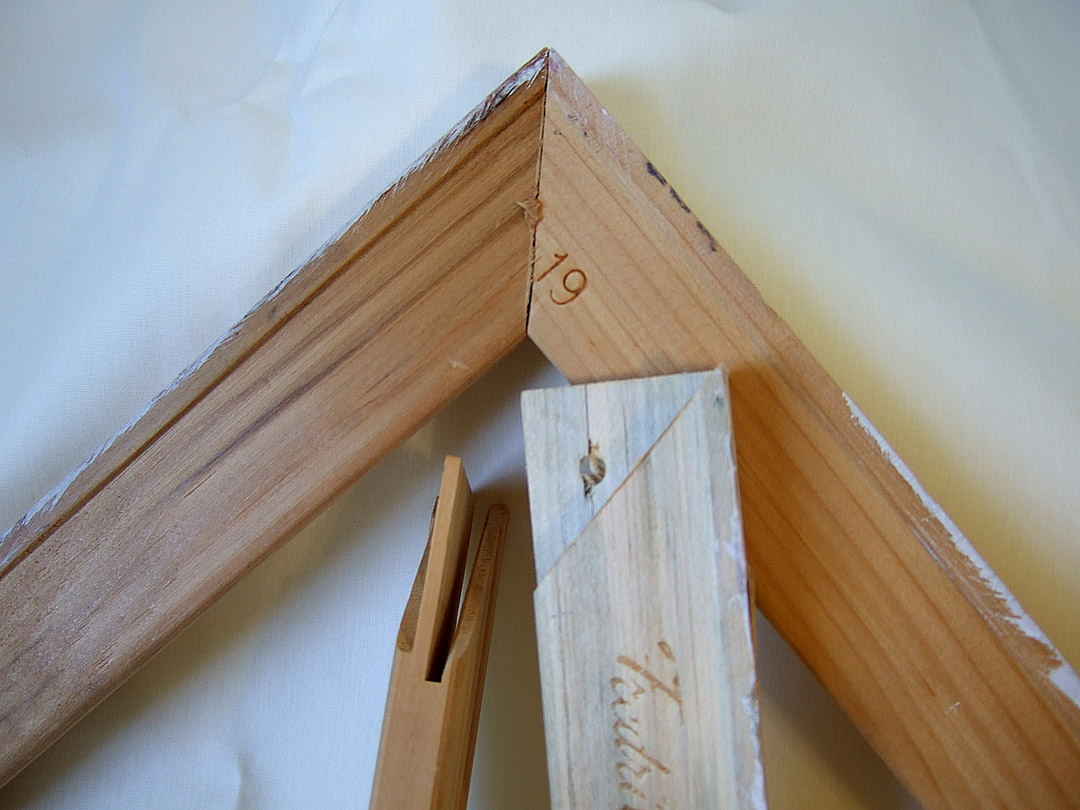
A fully assembled stretcher bar corner. Two unassembled stretcher bars displaying corner mitre construction.

A stretcher bar is used to construct a wooden stretcher used by artists to mount their canvases.

They are traditionally a wooden framework support on which an artist fastens a piece of canvas. They are also used for small-scale embroidery to provide steady tension, affixing the edges of the fabric with push-pins or a staple gun before beginning to sew, and then removing it from the stretcher when the work is complete. Stretchers are usually in the shape of a rectangle, although shaped canvases are also possible.

== Construction ==
Since a stretcher is simply a frame, it can be constructed in a variety of ways. The differences in construction have to do with how the corners are built. Commercially available pre-fabricated stretchers come in segments with interlocking corners, that can be fit together like puzzle pieces. Corner supports can also be made using simple woodworking techniques, however.

In the case of the French stretcher, a mitre joint is used to adhere the corners. "Keys" or small triangle wedges are inserted in the joint after stretching the canvas to give the canvas its final tension. When fastening the canvas, pressure should be distributed evenly around the stretcher to minimize warping due to unequal distribution of pull. Unlike other types of stretchers, the corner joints in French stretchers are not glued or fastened in any permanent way. This allows the canvas to be re-tensioned later, as it has a natural tendency to stretch and sag over time. In contrast, strainer bars stretch canvas in a fixed (non-adjustable) way. The keys became popular in the 19th century.

A simpler form of stretcher employs butt joints to adhere the corners. The joint is pinned and glued into place and can not be expanded after assembly.

== Design ==
The profiles on the stretcher bar should be slightly rounded. This has three advantages:

1. It allows the framer to see and obtain clear edges on images that have precise borders
2. It allows the canvas weave to "roll over" the profile rather than snap over a sharp edge which is a major cause of canvas cracking.
3. It also increases the surface area of the frame, which reduces its friction with the canvas. This will make it easier to pull the canvas and make it more taut.

There are many different stretcher bar profiles, and many different styles of cutting the wood. So it is impossible to say anything is "standard." There are also many big regional differences in the style and cutting of the wood, due to the historical reasons. For the same reasons, the wood used for making stretcher bars differs a lot from country to country depending on the forest that is present. But most stretchers, to avoid warping is made in well dried Nordic pinewood sourced from Scandinavia, Russia, and Canada.

Another way in which stretcher bars can be strengthened is by having a cross brace inserted. It is advised that lengths over 40" or 1m be fitted with a cross brace. By doing this it ensures the wood will not warp and will hang flat.

== Uses ==
The use of stretcher bars in the home print market has become increasingly prominent with inkjet-printed canvas prints becoming more popular in the home. This has given a rebirth to this old technique used in the art market for so many years.

Although artists use blank canvases and pre-stretched canvases in the art business, many photographers use stretcher bars for framing wedding photography and reproduction of photographic prints. Stretcher bars are also used in picture framing when framers are framing things like sport shirts etc. Stretcher bars are used extensively in theatrical productions for framing material backdrops.

When a photographer takes a picture then digitally transfers this onto a canvas via inkjet printing, he then stretches this over a stretcher frame. By wrapping the canvas all the way around the frame, known as gallery wrap, the photographer can then hang his picture on the wall, already framed.

== See also ==
- Tightening key
