= Canvas print =

Printing of images onto canvas

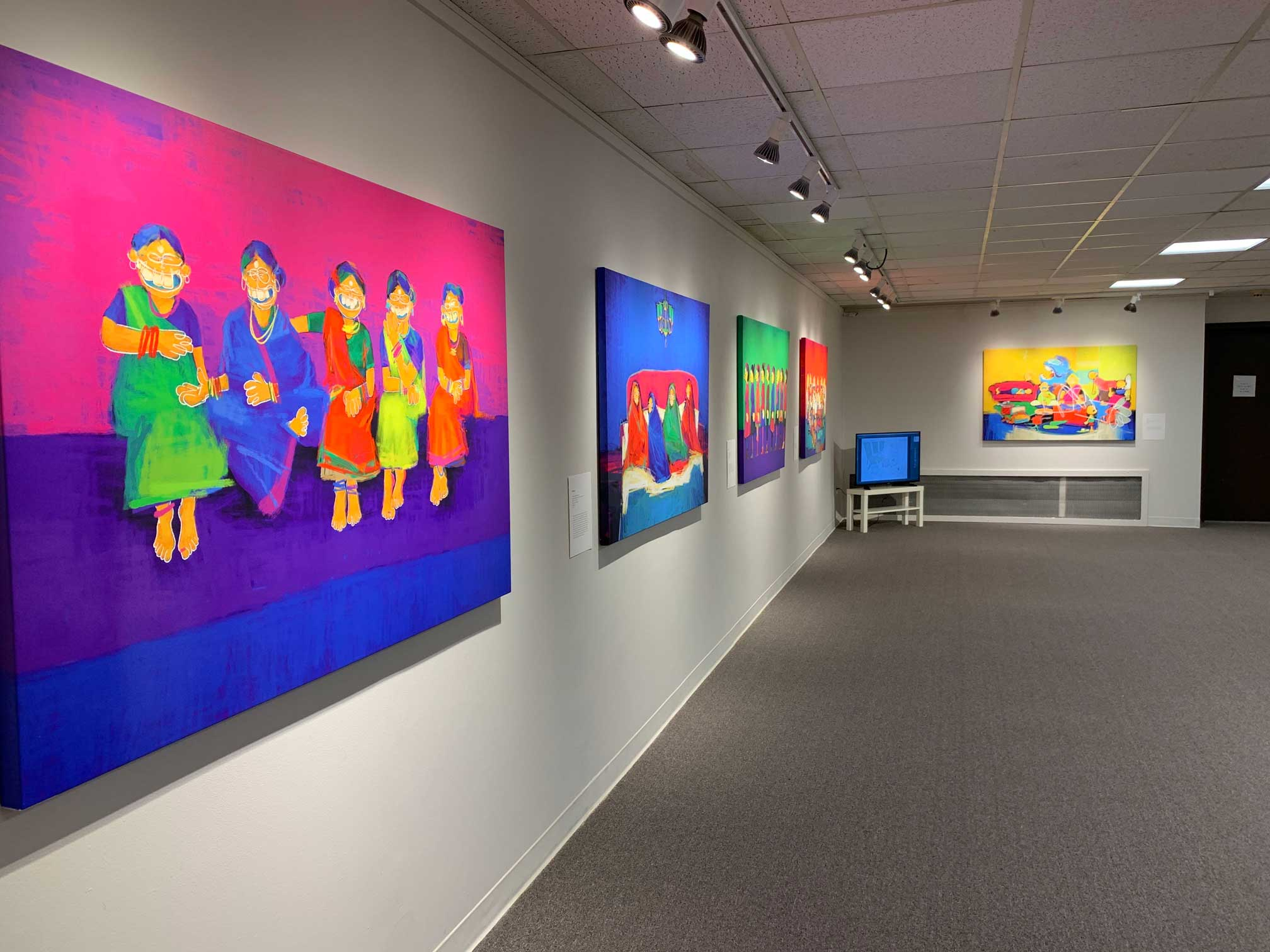
Digitally created art printed on canvas

A canvas print is the result of an image printed onto canvas which is often stretched, or gallery-wrapped, onto a frame and displayed. Canvas prints are used as the final output in an art piece, or as a way to reproduce other forms of art.

== Printing methods ==
Reproductions of original artwork have been printed on canvas for many decades using offset printing. Since the 1990s, canvas print has also been associated with either dye sublimation or inkjet print processes (often referred to as repligraph or giclée respectively). The canvas print material is generally cotton or plastic based poly canvas, often used for the reproduction of photographic images.

Digital printers capable of producing canvas prints range from small consumer printers owned by the artist or photographer themselves up to large format printing service printers capable of printing onto canvas rolls measuring 1.5 metres (59 in) or more. Digital files of artwork, paintings, photograph, or drawings may be sent directly to printing companies or Internet based printing services.

== Stretcher mounted ==
One of the display methods is to trim the canvas to size and then glue or staple it to traditional stretcher bars or a wooden panel and display it in a frame, or frame-less in a gallery wrap. The stretchers are sometimes constructed from solid pine and underpinned for added strength. A print that is designed to continue around the edges of a stretcher frame once gallery-wrapped is referred to as full-bleed.

== Uses for prints ==
Canvas prints are used as final output for fine art pieces or for reproduction of other types of two dimensional art (drawings, paintings, photograph, etc.).

Canvas prints are often used as a cheaper alternative to framed artwork as there is no glazing required and the stretcher is not usually visible, so the prints do not need to be varnished or treated.

== See also ==
- Shaped canvas
- Giclée
- Gallery wrap
- Watercolor paper
- Digital printing
