= Mirzai (garment) =

Full-sleeved waistcoat, A 19th century garment similar to a jacket

A mirzai (or mirzaee) was a garment similar to a jacket with "long and loose sleeves and open cuffs". It was worn under the jacket by males in the Indian subcontinent in the 19th century. The mirzai was sometimes made with cotton padding to protect the wearer from the cold.

== Name and mentions ==
Mirzai or mirzāi is a Hindustani language word that means a jacket. John Forbes Watson describes a mirzaee in his work titled Textile Manufactures and Costumes of the people of India as a garment of “respectable Mahomedans” and high ranking servants employed by Europeans, who wore the mirzai beneath an outer garment called a kuba, or quba. A kufcha was a similar garment with tight sleeves, and dugla was a term for a mirzai that was quilted.

== See also ==
- Salembaree
- Peshgeer
