= The Staircase Group =

1795 painting by Charles Willson Peale

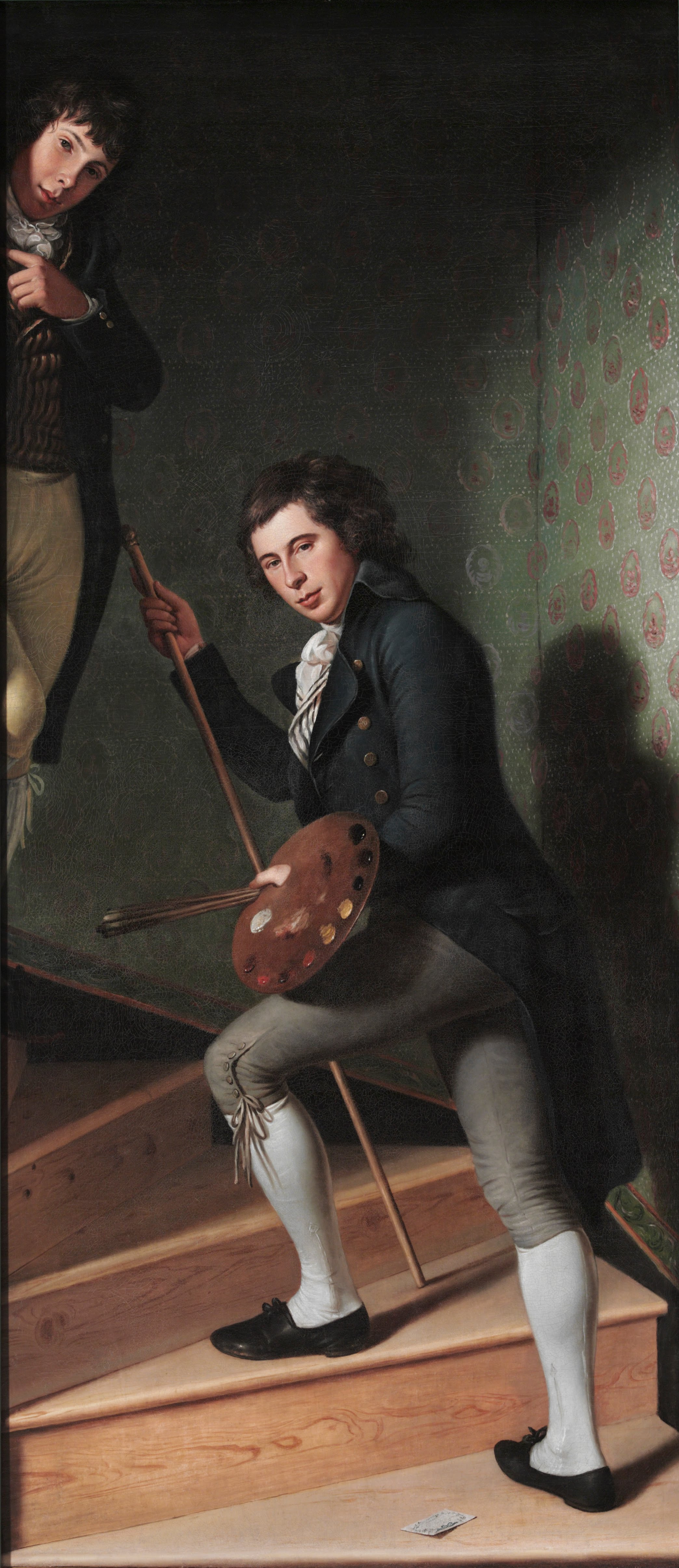
- Artist: Charles Willson Peale
- Year: 1795
- Medium: Oil on canvas
- Location: Philadelphia Museum of Art, Philadelphia, Pennsylvania, U.S.

The Staircase Group is a 1795 trompe-l'œil oil on door-shaped canvas double-portrait by Charles Willson Peale (1741–1827). The canvas is placed within an actual door frame which is then extended into a step. The painting's subjects are two of the artist's sons, painter Raphael Peale (1774–1825) and ornithologist and painter Titian Ramsay Peale I (1780–1798).

Peale painted this portrait in Pennsylvania with an extended bottom replication of a step at the end of the painting's staircase, thereby opening the work up from a rectangle into a shaped elongated morph.

The painting was in Peale's Philadelphia Museum as the venue took different forms and was housed at different locations in Philadelphia during Peale's lifetime and afterwards, until 1849 when what remained of the collection was sold.

The work is now held in the permanent collection of the Philadelphia Museum of Art.
