= Plastic canvas =

Craft material

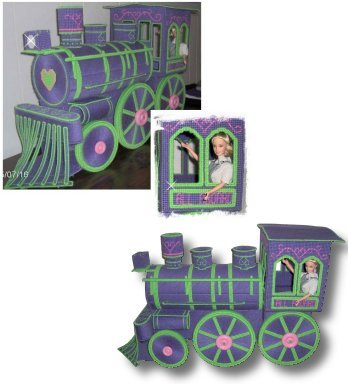
Train made in Plastic Canvas

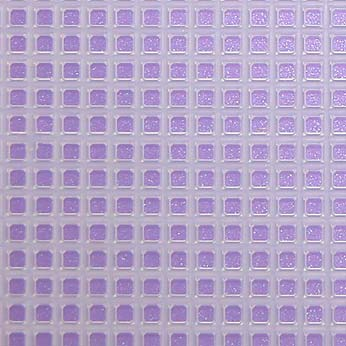
Close up of plastic canvas

Plastic canvas is a craft material of lightweight plastic with regularly spaced holes in imitation of embroidery canvas. It is also commonly known as vinyl weave.

Plastic canvas is typically used as a foundation for needlepoint or other canvas work embroidery, usually in acrylic or wool knitting yarn. Due to its rigidity, it is useful for creating 3-dimensional objects such as tissue box covers, small jewelry boxes, handbags, and other decorative objects.

Plastic canvas is manufactured in many colors and with various size holes for different thicknesses of yarn. As with textile canvas, these are described in count – that is, 10-count plastic canvas has 10 holes per linear inch. Typical sizes are 5-, 7-, 10-, and 14 count. It is most readily available in A4 size sheets but pre-made shapes such as circles, triangles as well as novelty shapes (e.g. dinosaur, bird, cross) are also available.

Plastic canvas is also employed in teaching needlepoint and cross stitch to children, since its rigid structure does not require the use of a hoop or frame.

== Other uses ==
Plastic canvas is also used by some for making animal mascot heads as a frame to build faux fur upon to make the head of the mascot, some people stick the plastic canvas together with glue but this is not the only method of construction or sticking together a frame of a mascot head.
