= Elizabeth Murray (artist) =

American painter (1940–2007)

- Born: September 6, 1940; Chicago, Illinois, U.S.
- Died: August 12, 2007 (aged 66)
- Education: School of the Art Institute of Chicago; Mills College
- Known for: Painting, printmaking
- Notable work: Do the Dance, Children Meeting, Painters' Progress, Careless Love, Blooming
- Spouse(s): Don Sunseri (div. 1973) Bob Holman (m. 1982)
- Children: 3
- Awards: MacArthur Foundation Grant; Larry Aldrich Prize

Elizabeth Murray (September 6, 1940 – August 12, 2007) was an American painter, printmaker and draughtsman. Her works are in many major public collections, including those of the Solomon R. Guggenheim Museum, the Hirshhorn Museum and Sculpture Garden, the Pérez Art Museum Miami, the Museum of Modern Art, the Whitney Museum of American Art, the San Francisco Museum of Modern Art, the Art Institute of Chicago, the Carnegie Museum of Art, and the Wadsworth Atheneum. Murray was known for her use of shaped canvases.

== Early life ==
Wiggle Manhattan, lithograph, 1992, Museum of Modern Art

Elizabeth Murray was born in Chicago, Illinois, United States to Irish-Catholic parents. Her father was a lawyer and her mother aspired to be a commercial artist. She encouraged her daughter to paint and with the help of her high school art teacher Murray entered the School of the Art Institute of Chicago in 1958 and graduated with a BFA in 1962. She earned her Master of Fine Arts degree from Mills College in 1964. As a student, she was influenced by painters ranging from Cézanne to Robert Rauschenberg and Jasper Johns.

== Career ==
She taught art at Daemen College from 1965 to 1967. In 1967, Murray moved to New York City. She first exhibited in 1971 in the Whitney Museum of American Art Annual Exhibition. One of her first mature works included Children Meeting, 1978 (now in the permanent collection of the Whitney Museum), an oil on canvas painting evoking human characteristics, personalities, or pure feeling through an interaction of non-figurative shapes, colour and lines. She is particularly noted for her shaped canvas paintings. Falling, an earlier example of her shaped canvas from 1976 can be found in the collection of the Pérez Art Museum Miami.

== Awards and honors ==
She was elected a Fellow of the American Academy of Arts and Sciences in 1998. In 1999, Murray was awarded a MacArthur Fellowship. This grant led directly to opening of the Bowery Poetry Club, a Lower East Side performance arts venue run by her husband, Bob Holman.

In 2006, her 40-year career was honored at New York City's Museum of Modern Art (MoMA). The retrospective was widely praised, with The New York Times noting that by the end of the exhibition, "You're left with the sense of an artist in the flush of her authority and still digging deep." As of 2008, Murray was only one of five female artists to have had a retrospective at the MoMA—the other four are Louise Bourgeois (in 1982), Lee Krasner (in 1984), Helen Frankenthaler (in 1989), and Lee Bontecou (in 2004).

== Personal life ==
Murray married sculptor Don Sunseri in 1963 in San Francisco. Murray and Sunseri had met three years prior at the Art Institute of Chicago. Among the guests at their wedding was Murray's close friend and fellow artist, Jennifer Bartlett. Murray and Sunseri had one son together, Dakota Sunseri, before they eventually divorced. Murray was later married to poet and poetry activist Bob Holman, whom she met in 1980. They had two children, daughters Sophia Murray Holman and Daisy Murray Holman. The couple remained together, splitting time between New York City and their farm in Washington County, New York, until Murray's death.

== Death ==
In 2007, Murray died of lung cancer. In her obituary, The New York Times wrote that Murray "reshaped Modernist abstraction into a high-spirited, cartoon-based, language of form whose subjects included domestic life, relationships and the nature of painting itself ..." The Bowery Poetry Club held a Praise Day in her honor on August 30, 2007, with artists Brice Marden and Joel Shapiro, writers Jessica Hagedorn and Patricia Spears Jones, and choreographers Elizabeth Streb and Yoshiko Chuma among the attendees; Artforum described the event as "a blend of the poignant and the comic that threatened to bring it closer to a Saturday Night Live skit shredding avant-garde performance practice than an actual art-world remembrance." A second private memorial was held at the Museum of Modern Art later that Fall. Murray was survived by her husband and three children.

== Legacy: art and feminism ==
Murray’s curatorial gesture would seem to have constituted a partial change of heart from her... previously self-contained feminism. It is important, though that her strategy for convincing was exhibiting––bringing images out of the shadows... As with the Abstract Expressionist record, so with MoMA, where far more works by women sit in storage than are on display.

— Robert Storr

After Murray's death, the A. G. Foundation, Columbia University, and the Archives of American Art established the "Elizabeth Murray Oral History of Women in the Visual Arts Project," to honor her memory. The A. G. Foundation's Agnes Gund said of her,

"It seems so right to honor Elizabeth Murray by archiving the lives, the thoughts, the dreams and goals of other women who—like herself—persisted in the visual arts, extending and enriching the world through their work," said the A. G. Foundation's Agnes Gund.

Murray's work was included in the 2021 exhibition Women in Abstraction at the Centre Pompidou. Her work was included in the 2024 exhibition Making Their Mark: Works from the Shah Garg Collection at the Berkeley Art Museum and Pacific Film Archive (BAMPFA).

== Artist residency ==
The Elizabeth Murray Artist Residency (EMAR) program by Collar Works, offers residencies to a diverse group of emerging and established artists and artists as parents. Collar Works is a non-profit art space in Troy, NY. The residency is an immersive, supportive, productive, and communal atmosphere for art-making and dialogue on a bucolic 77-acre farm in Washington County, NY. In 2017, the Murray-Holman family partnered with Collar Works to design a summer residency program for visual artists. Bob Holman was Elizabeth Murray's husband. The farm served as a summer home for the Murray-Holmans and her studio was located in the cathedral-like dairy barn. The family felt that the creative use of the property and natural surroundings would carry on Elizabeth Murray's legacy.

EMAR is a no-cost to attend, fully supported residency program accommodating 5-7 artists per week. Artists have the time and space to develop new works, with the opportunity for conversation with peers. There is 24- hour access to semi-private studios, artist stipends and private bedroom accommodations.

== Film ==
Everybody Knows...Elizabeth Murray, a film by Kristi Zea, exploring Murray's life and work, premiered at the Tribeca Film Festival in 2016.

== Bibliography ==
- Elizabeth Murray; Francine Prose; PaceWildenstein (Firm) Elizabeth Murray: paintings 1999-2003: March 7-April 19, 2003 Archived February 21, 2007, at the Wayback Machine (New York, N.Y.: PaceWildenstein, 2003) ISBN 1-930743-24-6
- Robert Storr; Museum of Modern Art (New York, N.Y.) Elizabeth Murray (New York: Museum of Modern Art; London: Thames & Hudson [distributor], 2005) ISBN 0-87070-493-1
- Elizabeth Murray: Drawings, 1980-1986 (exhibition catalogue, Pittsburgh, PA, Carnegie-Mellon U.A.G. 1986)
- Elizabeth Murray: Paintings and Drawings (exhibition catalogue, Dallas, TX, Museum A, and elsewhere, 1987)
- Heartney, Eleanor; Posner, Helaine; Princenthal, Nancy; Scott, Sue (2013). After the Revolution: Women Who Transformed Contemporary Art. Prestel Publishing Ltd. pp. 84–105. ISBN 978-3-7913-4755-4.
