= Luigi Malice =

Italian painter (1937–2026)

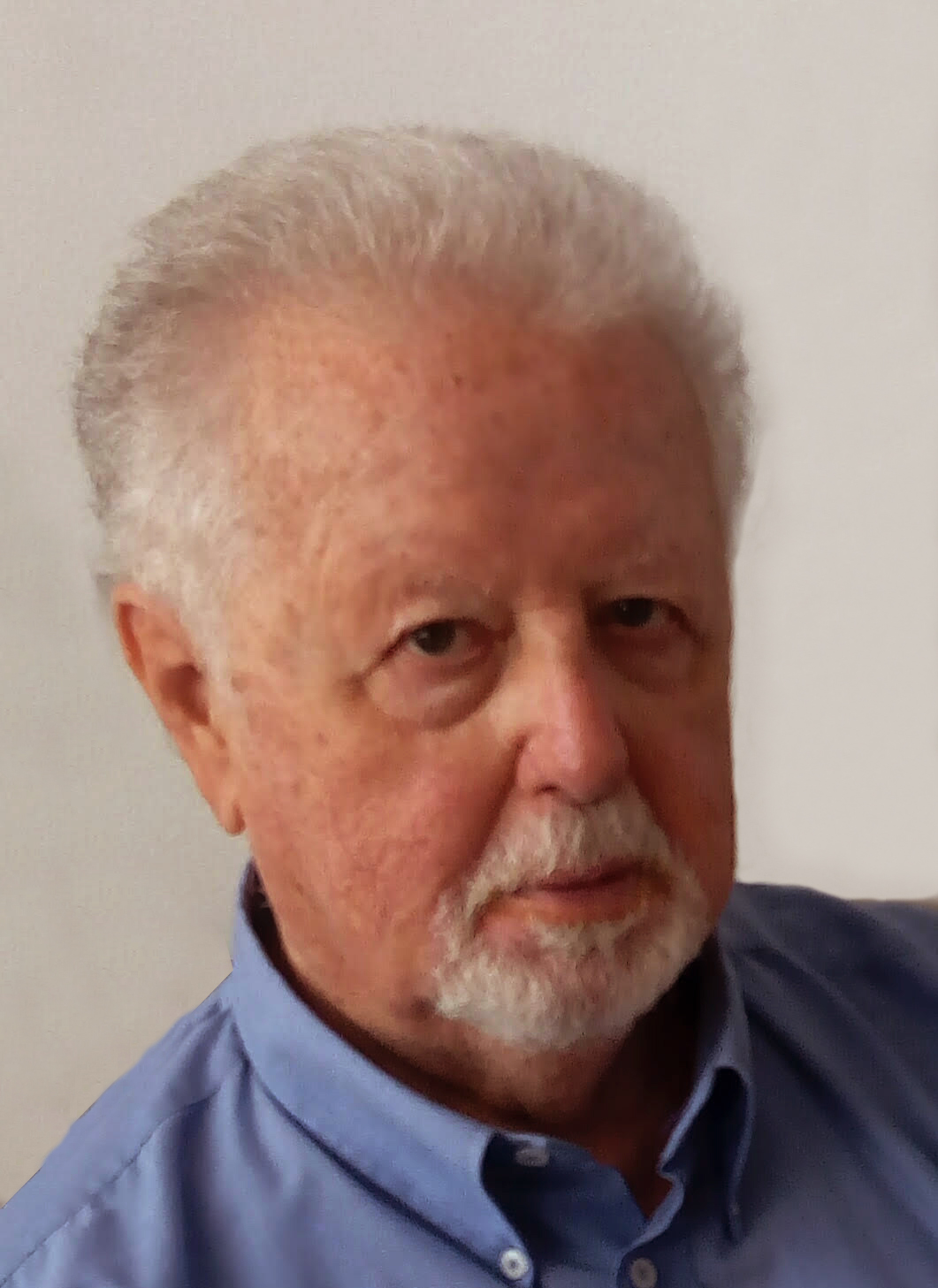
- Born: 14 March 1937; Naples, Italy
- Died: 14 October 2026 (aged 89); Brancaleone, Italy
- Education: Accademia di Belle Arte di Napoli
- Known for: Abstract art

Luigi Malice (14 March 1937 – 14 October 2026) was an Italian abstract artist.

== Life and career ==
Malice was born in Naples, Italy on 14 March 1937. He studied at Naples Academy of Fine Arts as a pupil of Emilio Notte, later studying under avant-garde and Informal Art painter Domenico Spinosa.

He began as an expressionist and figurative painter in the late 1950s, his then style demonstrated by his painting "Still life with figure" for which he received the Michetti Prize, and "Ricordo di Spagna" ("Memory of Spain") which Malice exhibited for the Posillipo Prize.

In the early 1960s, he approached the Arte Informale, an Italian art movement close to the American Abstract expressionism and to the French Art Informel or Tachisme.

In 1963, Malice became a teacher in Reggio Calabria, where he exhibited in collective and one-man shows, and in 1967 exhibited at the Flaccovio Gallery in Palermo and the Santo Stefano Gallery in Venice.

After 1968, he concentrated on sculpture, and works consisting of waterproof cloth ("tela ciriè") on twisted plywood, imitating shaped canvases, these related to the work of his contemporaries Enrico Castellani, Agostino Bonalumi, and Pino Pascali, but also to wooden silhouettes of men of Mario Ceroli, and in the early 1970s constructed works with ready-made Plexiglas panels.

Malice exhibited in 1968 at the New York Coliseum, and in 1984, held a retrospective exhibition in Milan. Subsequently, his art took on abstract impressionism and lyrism of the colours. The same year he became the principal of the Academy of Fine Arts, Reggio, Calabria. Malice exhibited at the Institute Francais "Le Grenoble" in Naples, and in a travelling exhibition that included Venice and Florence. In 1992, he presented a one-man show, "Percorsi 1965–1992" ("Itineraries 1965–1992"), at the Royal Palace, Naples. Since 2001, his work "Metamorphosis 1979" has been held in the Museo delle generazioni italiane, Pieve di Cento. Recently the artist exhibited his work at the Italian pavilion of the 54th Venice Biennale.

Malice died on 14 October 2026, at the age of 89.
