= Tightening key =

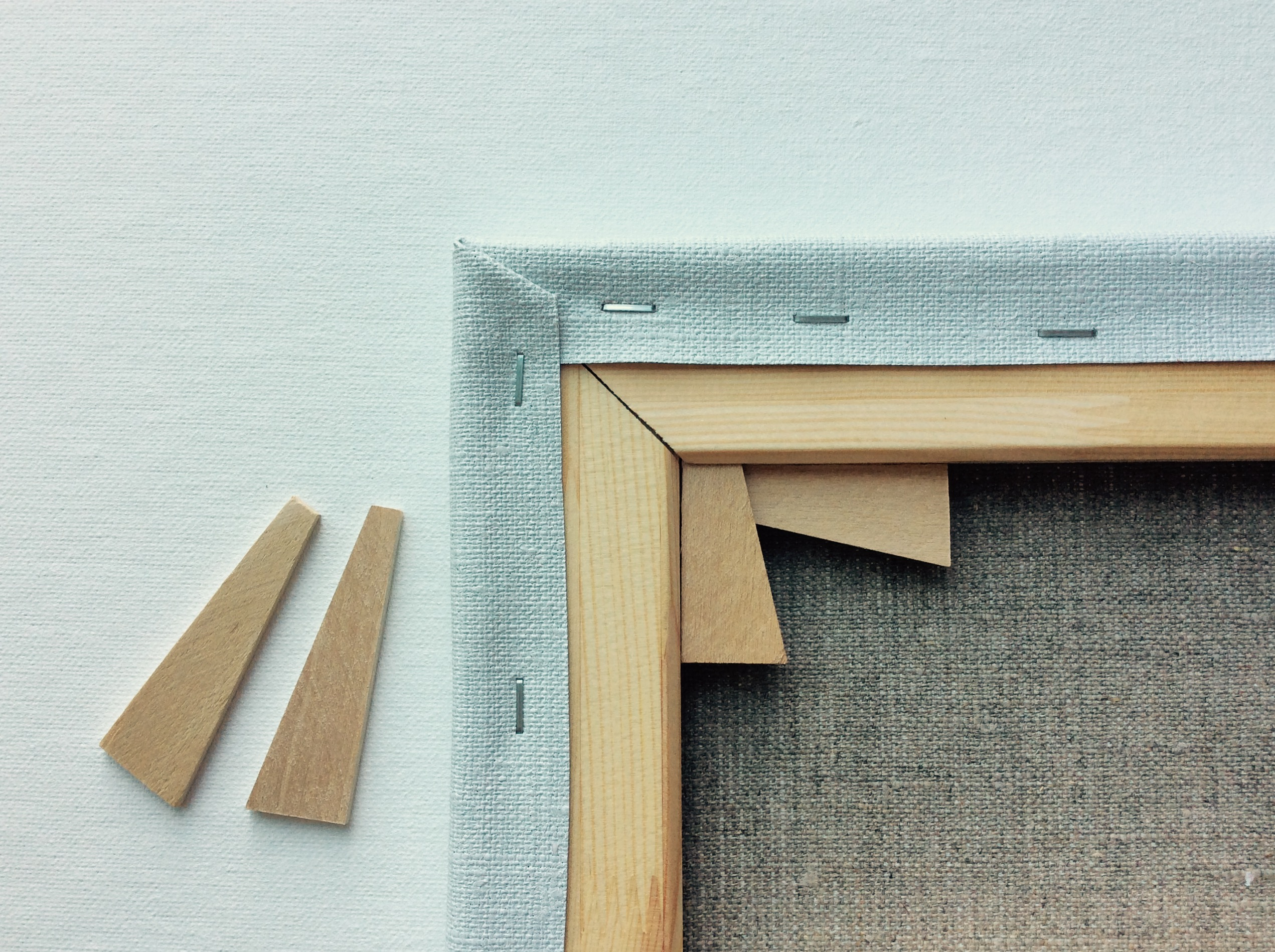
The back of a stretched canvas, with keys inserted at the corner, and additional keys off to the side.

A tightening key is a small wedge or shim used in the construction of a canvas stretcher frame with expandable joints. The key is inserted into the slotted inside the stretcher bars at the mitered corners of the frame to prevent or adjust sagging. Tightening keys are commonly made in plastic or wood, and are often called corner keys or corner wedges. Tightening keys were introduced in the mid-18th century, making expandable (versus rigid) stretcher frames possible.

== Use ==
Most stretcher frames have eight keys, two in each corner. Each key is tapped in to expand the stretcher bars slightly, tensioning the canvas. The keys can be used to re-tighten the canvas as it relaxes naturally over time. If the key is tapped too forcefully, it may tear the side of the canvas. Conversely, keys that become too loose can fall out during handling and damage the painting's surface. The process of inserting keys into the stretcher is called "keying-out."

== Types ==
Corner keys or wedges come in various forms. Most are manufactured for a specific size stretcher bar, making framers and artists hold various sizes in stock. A product called "wedgee" eliminates the need to stock many types as it has a male / female profile, which allows it to be pressed together to fit most corner cut-outs.

== See also ==
- Stretcher bar
