= Shaped canvas =

Paintings on non-rectangular canvases

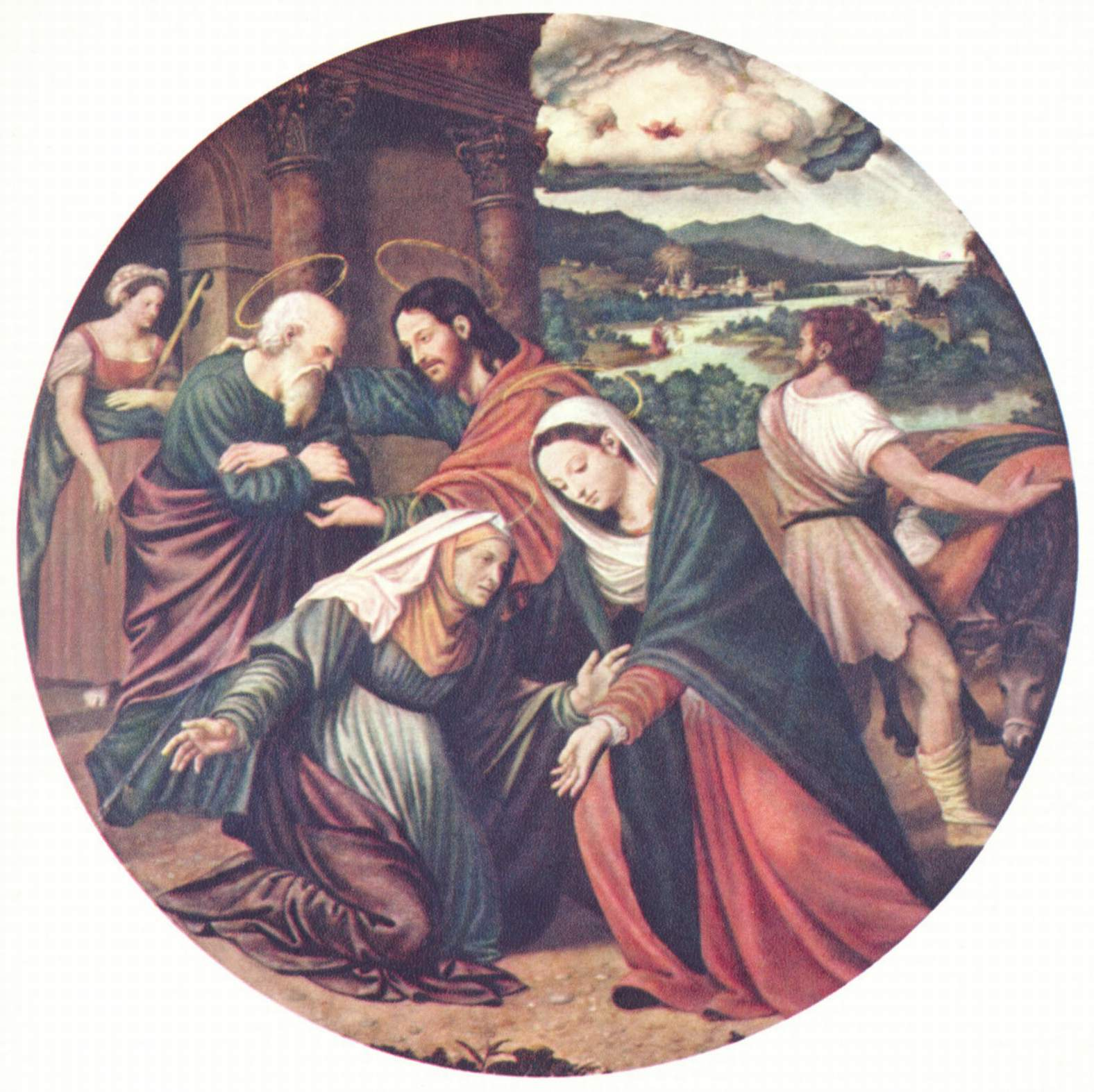
Example of a shaped canvas

Shaped canvases are paintings that depart from the normal flat, rectangular configuration. Canvases may be shaped by altering their outline, while retaining their flatness. An ancient, traditional example is the tondo, a painting on a round panel or canvas: Raphael, Michelangelo, and Botticelli, as well as some other Renaissance painters, sometimes chose this format for madonna paintings. Alternatively, canvases may be altered by losing their flatness and assuming a three-dimensional surface. Or they can do both. That is, they can assume shapes other than rectangles, and also have surface features that are three-dimensional. Arguably, changing the surface configuration of the painting transforms it into a sculpture. But shaped canvases are generally considered paintings.

Apart from any aesthetic considerations, there are technical matters, having to do with the very nature of canvas as a material, that tend to support the flat rectangle as the norm for paintings on canvas.

In the literature of art history and criticism, the term shaped canvas is particularly associated with certain works created mostly in New York after about 1960, during a period when a great variety and quantity of such works were produced. According to the commentary at a Rutgers University exhibition site, ... "the first significant art historical attention paid to shaped canvases occurred in the 1960s...."

== Pioneers of modern shaped-canvas painting ==
In 1795 the painter Charles Willson Peale in Philadelphia in the U.S. state of Pennsylvania completed The Staircase Group a trompe l'oeil oil on door-shaped canvas work of double portraiture depicting two of his sons with at the work's bottom a replication of a step at the end of the painting's staircase, thus thereby opening the work up from a rectangle into a shaped elongated morph.

Peter Laszlo Peri created polychromatic "cut-out" paintings| as part of the Constructivist movement between 1921 and 1924. These works which anticipate "shaped canvas" created after 1945 were exhibited widely in the 1920s, notably in two joint exhibitions with László Moholy-Nagy at Der Sturm Gallery, Berlin, 1922 and 1923, and at the International Exhibition of Modern Art assembled by Societe Anonyme at the Brooklyn Museum in New York City in 1926.

Abraham Joel Tobias made "shaped canvases" in the 1930s. Uruguayan artist Rhod Rothfuss began to experiment with "marco irregular" paintings in 1942, late in 1944 published in Arturo magazine the seminal text "El marco: un problema de la plástica actual". Munich-born painter Rupprecht Geiger exhibited "shaped canvases" in 1948 in Paris, France. Paintings exhibited by the New Orleans born abstract painter Edward Clark shown at New York's Brata Gallery in 1957 have also been termed shaped canvas paintings.

Between the late 1950s through the mid-1960s Jasper Johns experimented with shaped and compartmentalized canvases, notably with his Three Flags painting – one canvas placed on top of another, larger canvas. Robert Rauschenberg's experimental assemblages and "combines" of the 1950s also explored variations of divided and shaped canvas. The Argentine-Italian artist Lucio Fontana also began early on the experiment in shaped and compartmentalized canvases with his Concetto Spaziale, Attese series in 1959. Assigning a date to the origin of the postwar shaped canvas painting may not be possible, but certainly it had emerged by the late 1950s.

== Postwar modern art and the shaped canvas ==
Frances Colpitt ("The Shape of Painting in the 1960s"; Art Journal, Spring 1991) states flatly that "the shaped canvas was the dominant form of abstract painting in the 1960s". She writes that the shaped canvas, "although frequently described as a hybrid of painting and sculpture, grew out of the issues of abstract painting and was evidence of the desire of painters to move into real space by rejecting behind-the-frame illusionism." .

Frank Stella, Kenneth Noland, Ellsworth Kelly, Barnett Newman, Charles Hinman, Ronald Davis, Sven Lukin, Edward Clark, Richard Tuttle, Leo Valledor, Neil Williams, John Levee, David Novros, Ron Gorchov, Robert Mangold, Michael Heizer, Dean Fleming, Paul Mogenson, Clark Murray, and Al Loving are examples of artists associated with the use of the shaped canvas during the period beginning in the early 1960s. Geometric abstract artists, minimalists, and hard-edge painters may, for example, elect to use the edges of the image to define the shape of the painting rather than accepting the rectangular format. In fact, the use of the shaped canvas is primarily associated with paintings of the 1960s and 1970s that are coolly abstract, formalist, geometrical, objective, rationalistic, clean-lined, brashly sharp-edged, or minimalist in character. There is a connection here with post-painterly abstraction, which reacts against the abstract expressionists' mysticism, hyper-subjectivity, and emphasis on making the act of painting itself dramatically visible – as well as their solemn acceptance of the flat rectangle as an almost ritual prerequisite for serious painting. While the shaped canvas first challenged the formalized rectangular shape of paintings, it soon questioned the constraints of two-dimensionality. According to Donald Judd in his Complete Writings: 'The main thing wrong with painting is that it is a rectangular plane placed flat against the wall. A rectangle is a shape itself: it is obviously the whole shape; it determines and limits the arrangement of whatever is on or in it". In 1964, the Solomon R. Guggenheim Museum organized the definitive exhibition: The Shaped Canvas curated by Lawrence Alloway. Lucy Lippard noted that this show focused exclusively on paintings with a "one-sided continuous surface" In 1965, Frank Stella and Henry Geldzahler confronted this definition of the shaped canvas by introducing three-dimensional shaped canvases by artists Charles Hinman and Will Insley in their seminal group show "Shape and Structure" at Tibor de Nagy Gallery in New York. The entry of paintings into the third dimension paintings was an important development of the shaped canvas as it questioned the frontier between painting and sculpture.

The apertured, superimposed, multiple canvases of Jane Frank in the 1960s and 1970s are a special case: while generally flat and rectangular, they are rendered sculptural by the presence of large, irregularly shaped holes in the forward canvas or canvases, through which one or more additional painted canvases can be seen. A student of Hans Hofmann, and sharing his concern for pictorial depth as well as his reverence for nature, she also favored colors, textures, and shapes that are complex, nuanced, and organic or earthen – giving her work a brooding or introspective quality that further sets it apart from that of many other shaped-canvas painters.

In the late 1960s, Trevor Bell, a leading member of the British St. Ives group introduced dynamic shaped-canvas paintings that combined radical, angular structures with an abstract expressionist sensibility. These works continued to evolve into the 1970s as Bell's works were exhibited in the Corcoran Gallery of Art in Washington, DC and the Tate Gallery in London. The artist's highly chromatic, color field surfaces on massive canvases merged shaped painting and the subsequent blank space surrounding the object into a state of equal importance. The Italian artist Luigi Malice also experimented with shaped canvases in the late 1960s.

Pop artists such as Tom Wesselmann, Jim Dine, and James Rosenquist also took up the shaped canvas medium. Robin Landa writes that "Wesselmann uses the shape of the container [by which Landa means the canvas] to express the organic quality of smoke" in his "smoker" paintings. According to Colpitt, however, the use of the shaped canvas by 1960s pop artists was considered at the time to be something other than shaped canvas painting properly speaking: "At the same time, not all reliefs qualified as shaped canvases, which, as an ideological pursuit in the sixties, tended to exclude Pop art." (op. cit., p. 52)

== More recent shaped canvas art ==
Among shaped-canvas artists of more recent generations, Elizabeth Murray (1940–2007) produced playfully "exploding" canvases, in which exuberance of shape and color seems to force itself outside the normative rectangle – or, as a 1981 New York Times review put it: "...the inner shapes blast off from their moorings and cause the whole painting to fly apart."

Mokha Laget (born 1959) is known for abstract geometric shaped canvas paintings and her use of color, often inspired by the light and atmosphere of her home in New Mexico. Laget studied with Washington Color School painters at the Corcoran College of Art and Design, and worked as an assistant to Gene Davis.

Fred Bendheim (born 1956) is a contemporary artist based in New York known for his work with abstract shaped paintings.

Singapore's Anthony Poon (1945–2006) continued the tradition of cool, abstract, minimalist geometry associated with the shaped canvas in the 1960s. The analytical poise and undulating repetitions in his work somewhat recall the work of modular constructivist sculptors such as Erwin Hauer and Norman Carlberg.

The Filipino artist Pacita Abad (1946–2004) stuffed and stitched her painted canvases for a three-dimensional effect, combining this technique (which she called trapunto, after a kind of quilting technique) with free-wheeling mixed media effects, riotous color, and abstract patterning suggestive of festive homemade textiles, or of party trappings such as streamers, balloons, or confetti. The total effect is joyously extrovert and warm – quite opposed to both the minimalist and pop art versions of "cool".

In reference to the shaped paintings of Jack Reilly (born 1950), Robin Landa emphasizes the power of the shaped canvas to create a sensation of movement: "Many contemporary artists feel that the arena of painting can be greatly extended by the use of shaped canvases. Movement is established in the container (canvas) itself as well as in the internal space of the container." A 1981 review in Artweek stated "These intricately constructed pieces are related to wall sculpture, bridging the gap between painting and sculpture, they have an illusionary sculptural presence." An additional function of the shaped canvas in Reilly's earlier work was to emphasize the ambiguity of pictorial space in abstract art.

The Argentine artist Ladislao Pablo Győri (born 1963) became interested in non-representative and rigorous geometry formulations in the 1990s. The study of the paintings of the aforementioned Rhod Rothfuss led him to work in the realization of Madí Turning Paintings-Relief (irregular frame) and 3D digital animations of those geometric structures. Gyula Kosice (sculptor, poet, theorist, and one of the founders of the Argentine avant-garde of the 1940s) wrote: "He has rationally computerized the primordial ideas of Madi Art... I am convinced that his works radiate an undeniable quality and originality."

== Non-rectangular paintings ==
Artists have often departed from the norm, especially in circumstances requiring special commissions, an example being the paintings Henri Matisse created for Albert C. Barnes and for Nelson Rockefeller.

In certain instances, shaped canvas paintings can be seen as painting in relationship to sculpture and to wall relief. During the early to mid-1960s many young painters born in the 1920s, 1930s, and 1940s made the transition from painting flat rectangles to painting shaped canvases; some of those artists decided to make sculpture and some artists like Kenneth Noland, Frank Stella, and Ellsworth Kelly did both. Other materials can be used in place of canvas. More viable materials might obviate some of the drawbacks of shaped canvas.

== See also ==
- Strainer bar
- Park Place Gallery
