= Salembaree =

Strong fabric used to make tents

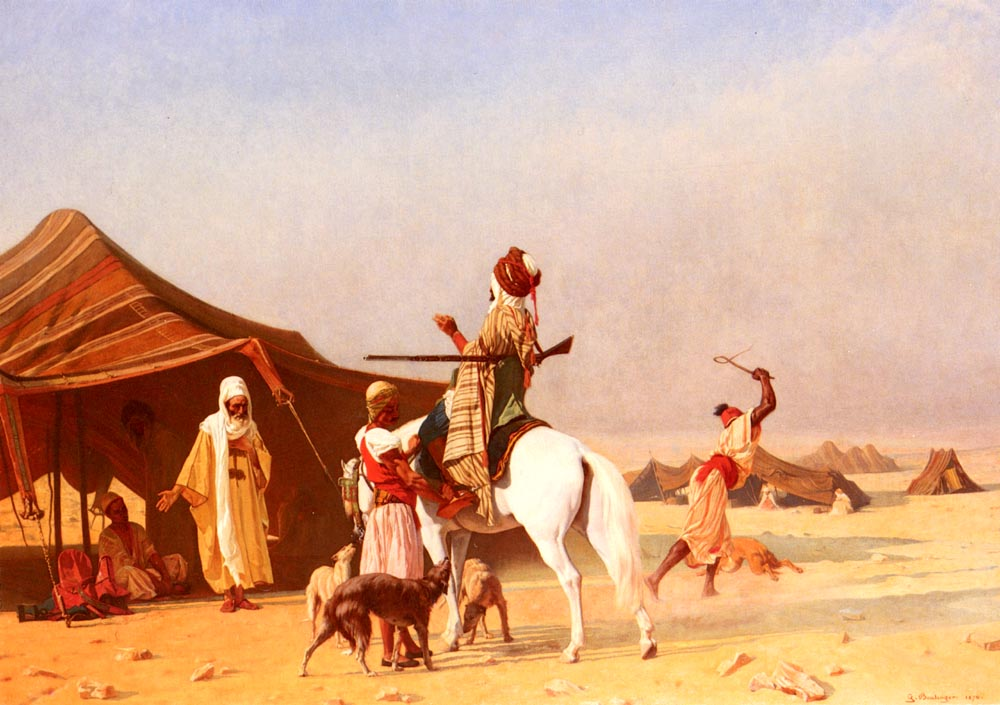
A tent from Boulanger's painting C'est Un Emir.

Salembaree is an obsolete variant of cotton cloth that was a coarse, stout and heavy fabric. It was made in the Indian subcontinent. The cloth was used for tents in India and Pakistan. Kathee was an alternative name for Salembaree. John Forbes Watson mentions these fabrics under the Canvas category in his work titled Textile Manufactures and Costumes of the people of India.

== See also ==
- Sailcloth
- Canvas
