= Marine canvas =

Marine canvas refers to a varied array of fabrics used in the fabrication and production of awnings, covers, tarps, sunshades, signs and banners for the advertising, boating, trucking, tenting, structural and medical industries. The term "marine canvas" is also used more narrowly to refer specially to boat cover products.

When referring to materials "marine canvas" is a catch–all phrase that covers hundreds of materials, for instance: acrylics, PVC coated polyester, silicone treated substrates and many coated meshes suitable for outdoor use. Most ¨marine canvas¨ materials offer good UV resistance, and, to some extent, water resistance or waterproofness. Two of the most popular fabrics used today are solution dyed acrylic canvas such as Sunbrella and PVC coated woven polyester such as Stamoid. Such synthetic fabrics can last for many years before deteriorating due to UV radiation. Marine canvas is typically used to protect materials susceptible to UV damage like varnished wood, non-UV resistant plastics, and outdoor stored sails. Other boat specific uses include hatch covers for interior sun protection and winch covers for protection from deterioration and fouling due to seawater, rain, and dirt exposure.

Products often referred to as "marine canvas" and made from "marine canvas" include biminis, dodgers, and similar enclosures that protect some part or section of a boat from the weather and/or to create a more comfortable environment for the boat user(s). These types of products can also include additional features such as transparent windows, lights, or storage. In some instances, these covers are also created purely, or in part, for aesthetic purposes.

The design of these covers requires the fabricator to create a custom pattern for the frame or object being covered. This can be done via careful measurement, but more commonly the finial material or a disposable templating material (typically paper or plastic sheet) is laid directly over the frame or object and then marked. Marks for cuts, seams, fasteners and chafe protection are applied to the pattern, which is then either used directly or transferred to the finial material from the templating material.

The thread used to stitch modern marine type canvas is typically made from Polyester or PTFE with sizes ranging from #69, #92, #138. Polyester thread is widely available and relatively low cost compared to PTFE, but PTFE thread has become increasingly popular due to its far greater resistance to ultraviolet radiation and chemical decomposition in a marine environment. This increased durability also adds lifespan as thus cost effectiveness to the finial product helping to offset the initially higher cost. Nylon and natural fiber thread is rarely used as neither have UV resistance comparable to Polyester or PTFE.

== See also ==
- Sail
