= Sven Lukin =

Sven Lukin (1934 in Riga, Latvia - March 24, 2022) was a Latvian painter who The New York Times, in 1958, called "the father of the shaped canvas".

His signature works, what he is most remembered for are his "minimalist paintings in relief, and abstract, colored canvases in three dimensions".

Born in Latvia, Lukin emigrated with his family into the United States in 1948, when he was 14.

In 1964, Lukin was one of five artists included in the seminal exhibition: "The Shaped Canvas" at the Solomon R. Guggenheim Museum in New York curated by Lawrence Alloway.. Lukin's work was the subject of solo exhibitions both at the Dwan Gallery in Los Angeles in 1963, and the Pace Gallery in Boston, Massachusetts also in 1963, into the very beginning of 1964 .
