= Will Insley =

American painter and architect (1929–2011)

- Born: October 15, 1929; Indianapolis, Indiana
- Died: August 12, 2011 (aged 81); New York City, New York
- Education: Amherst College and Harvard Graduate School of Design
- Known for: painting and architecture
- Awards: Guggenheim fellowship

Will Insley (October 15, 1929 – August 12, 2011) was an American painter, architect, and planner of utopian urban models. As a painter of geometric abstraction, he is known for his large-area geometrical picture elements.

== Biography ==
Insley studied at Amherst College, in Amherst, Massachusetts. He also had his first solo exhibition there. In 1955, he received his master's degree in Architecture from the Harvard Graduate School of Design.

From 1965 on, Insley developed wall fragments for spaces in utopian cities which he believed should be adapted to a better human way of thinking and trading i.e. The Interior Building - the inner building that man is to build externally. This utopia was his central work: a planned "Onecity" in the middle of the United States with 160,000 square miles of converted area for the entire population. He created plans, elevations, wall fragments and models which are systematically structured.

From 1966 on, he was a guest lecturer at several universities and colleges. Beginning in 1969 he taught at the School of Visual Arts in New York City.

Insley's work was included in Documenta 5 in Kassel, Germany in 1972 in the Department of Individual Mythologies. His works in the aforementioned exhibition included a model, isometry and pencil drawing for "Gate - First Stage of the Interior Building", and "The Interior Building - Overall Plan" 6. He also exhibited in Documenta 6.

Insley's artwork has been exhibited in numerous museums in the United States and Europe, including a solo exhibition at The Solomon R. Guggenheim Museum, 1984, and in 1971 at the Museum of Modern Art in New York City. Insley's artwork is in the collection of Brooklyn Museum of Art, Smithsonian Museum, Museum of Modern Art, Whitney Museum of American Art, Indianapolis Museum of Art, North Carolina Museum of Art, Hirshhorn Museum and Sculpture Garden and many others. A chapter is dedicated to Insley in the reference publication, “The New American Abstraction 1950-1970” by Claudine Humblet. Insley received the award of the National Foundation on Arts and Humanities and a Guggenheim fellowship. Insley lived in New York City. Since his death in 2011, his artistic estate is exclusively managed by Westwood Gallery in New York City.
