= Canvas =

Heavy-duty plain-woven fabric

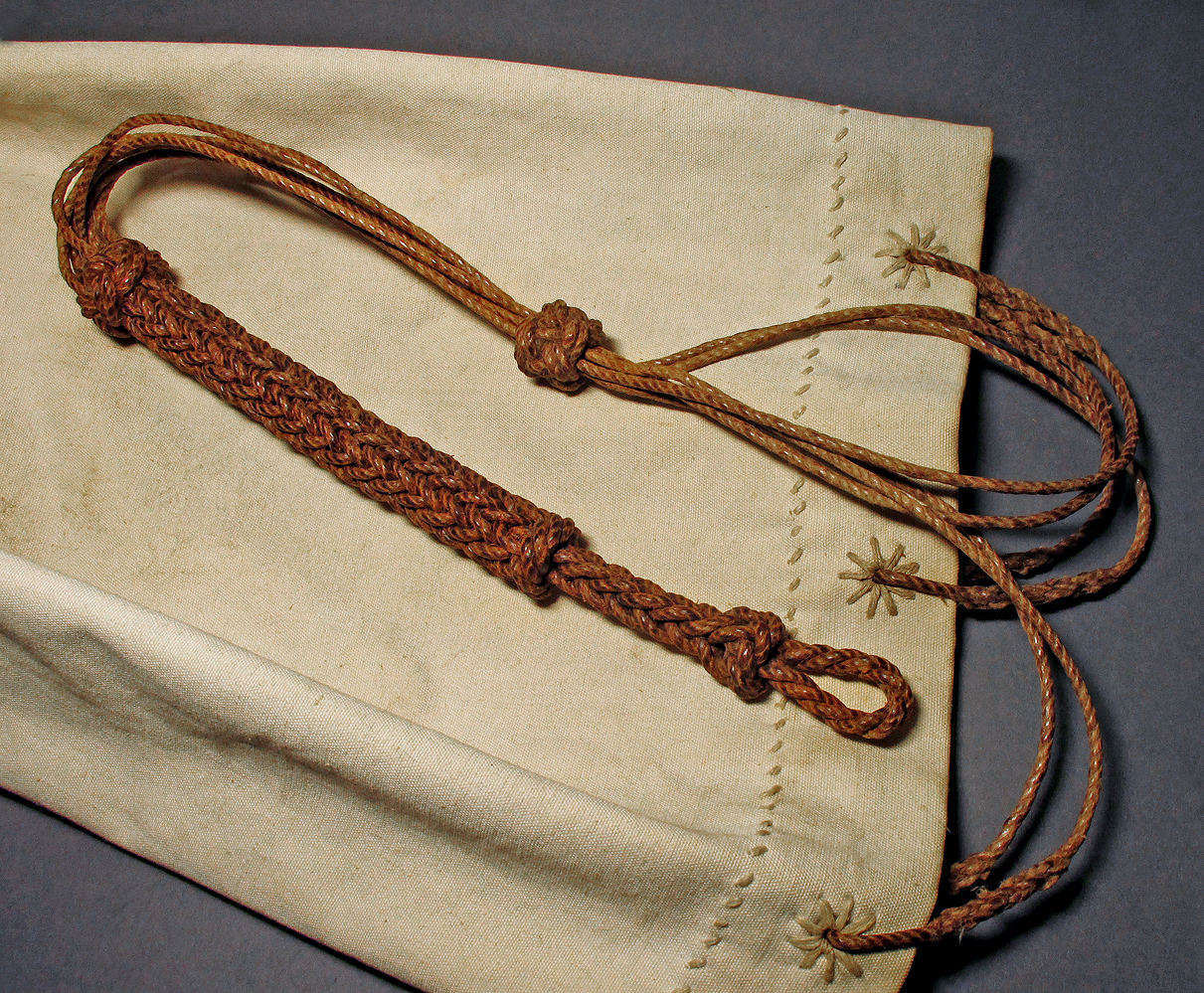
Sailor bag made of canvas

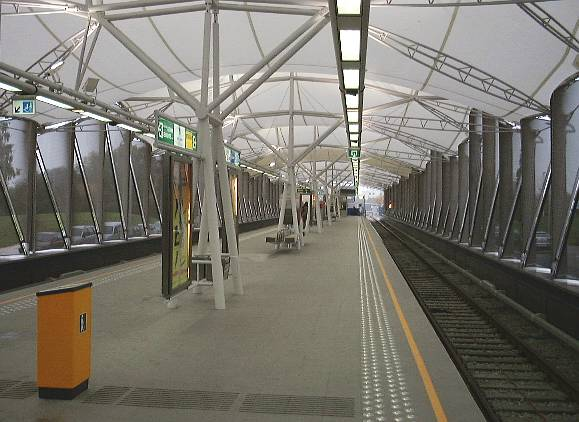
Canvas roof at the Erasmus station of the Brussels Metro

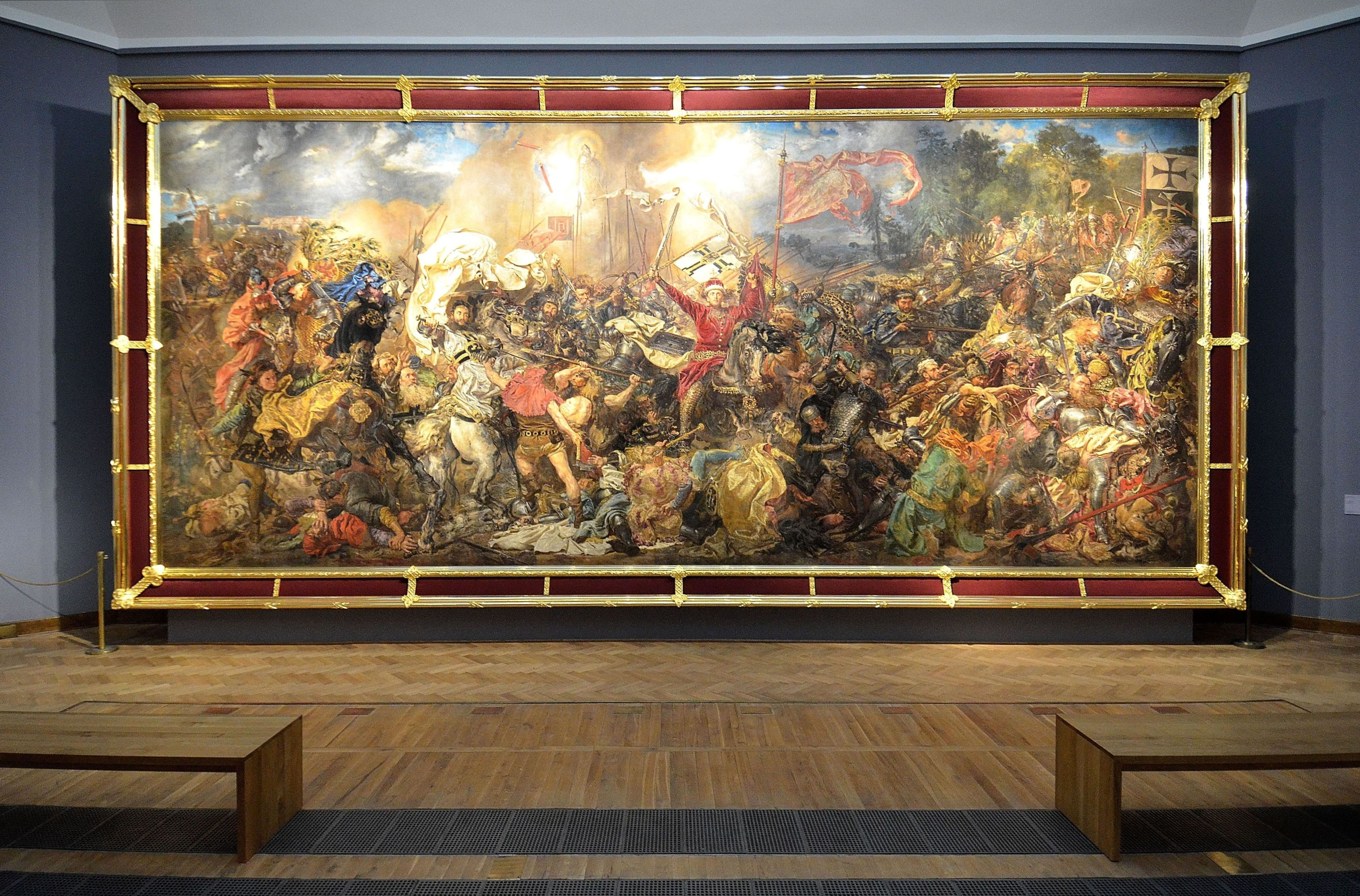
One of Poland's biggest canvas paintings, the Battle of Grunwald, 1878, by Jan Matejko (426 cm × 987 cm (168 in × 389 in)), displayed in the National Museum in Warsaw

Canvas is a durable plain-woven fabric used for making sails, tents, marquees, backpacks, shelters, as a support for oil painting and for other items for which sturdiness is required, as well as in such fashion objects as handbags, electronic device cases, and shoes. It is popularly used by artists as a painting surface, typically stretched across a wooden frame.

Although historically made from hemp, modern canvas is usually made of cotton, linen, or sometimes polyvinyl chloride (PVC). It differs from other heavy cotton fabrics, such as denim, in being plain weave rather than twill weave. Canvas comes in two basic types: plain and duck. The threads in duck canvas are more tightly woven. The term duck comes from the Dutch word for cloth, doek. In the United States, canvas is classified in two ways: by weight (ounces per square yard) and by a graded number system. The numbers run in reverse of the weight so a number ten canvas is lighter than number four.

The word "canvas" is derived from the 13th century Anglo-French canevaz and the Old French canevas. Both may be derivatives of the Vulgar Latin cannapaceus for "made of hemp", originating from the Greek κάνναβις (cannabis).

== For painting ==
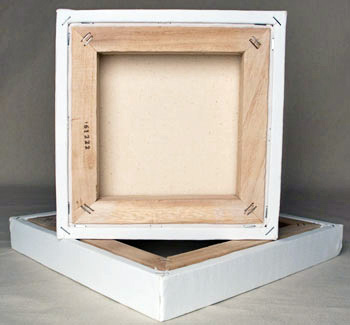
Canvas on stretcher bar

Canvas has become a common support medium for oil painting, acrylic painting, pour paint, watercolor, etc., replacing wooden panels. One of the earliest surviving oils on canvas is a French Madonna with angels from around 1410 in the Gemäldegalerie, Berlin. Its use in Saint George and the Dragon by Paolo Uccello in about 1470, and Sandro Botticelli's Birth of Venus in the 1480s was still unusual for the period. Large paintings for country houses were more likely to be on canvas, as it was less expensive than panel painting. Another common category of paintings on lighter cloth such as linen was in distemper or glue, often used for banners to be carried in procession. This is a less durable medium, and surviving examples such as Dirk Bouts' Entombment, in distemper on linen (1450s, National Gallery) are rare, and often rather faded in appearance.

Panel painting remained more common until the 16th century in Italy and the 17th century in Northern Europe. Mantegna and Venetian artists were among those leading the change; Venetian sail canvas was readily available and regarded as the best quality.

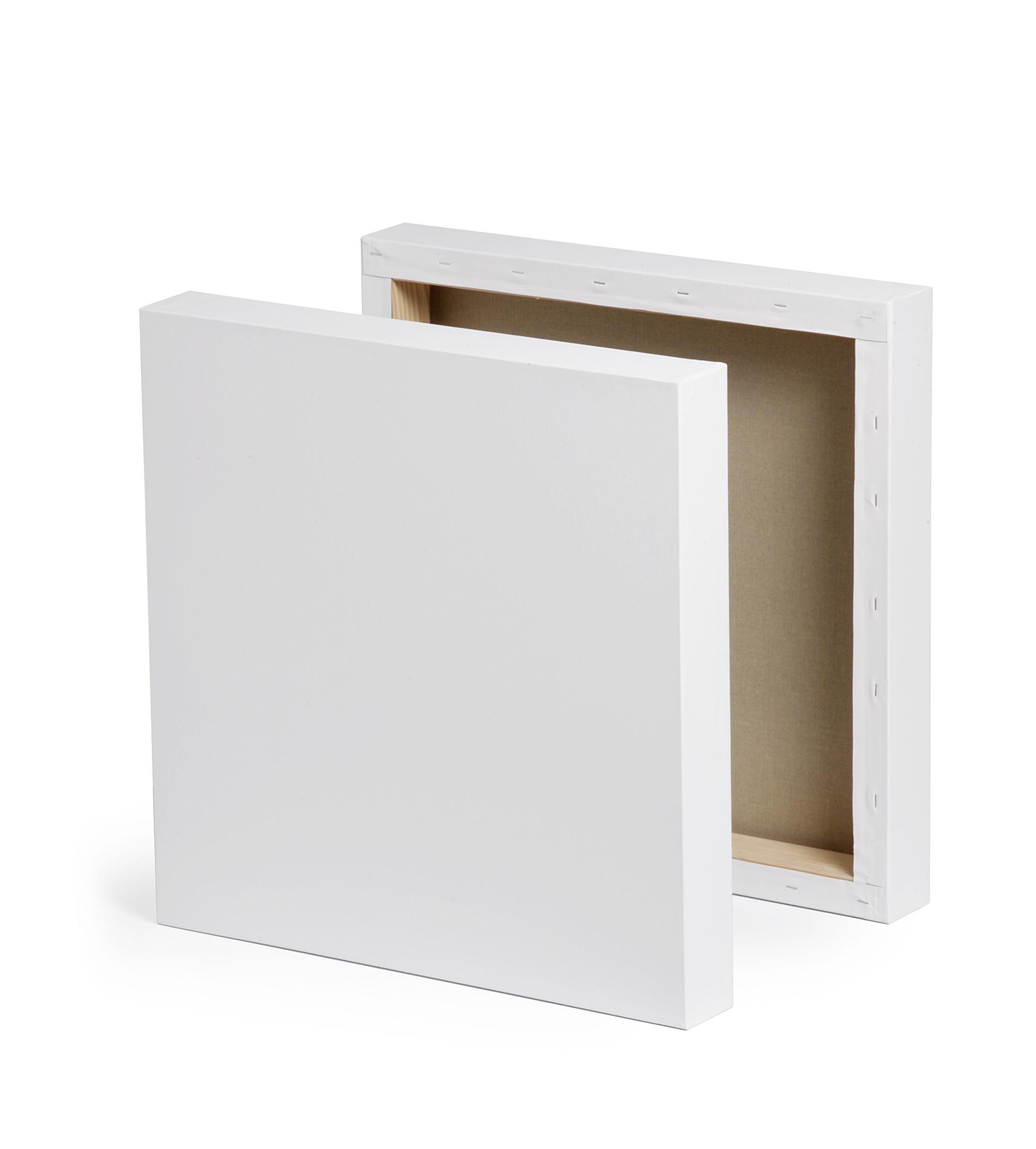
Canvas stretched on wooden frame

Canvas is usually stretched across a wooden frame called a stretcher and may be coated with gesso prior to being used to prevent oil paint from coming into direct contact with the canvas fibers which would eventually cause the canvas to decay. A traditional and flexible chalk gesso is composed of lead carbonate and linseed oil, applied over a rabbit skin glue ground; a variation using titanium white pigment and calcium carbonate is rather brittle and susceptible to cracking. As lead-based paint is poisonous, care has to be taken in using it. Various alternative and more flexible canvas primers are commercially available, the most popular being a synthetic latex paint composed of titanium dioxide and calcium carbonate, bound with a thermo-plastic emulsion.

Many artists have painted onto unprimed canvas, such as Jackson Pollock, Kenneth Noland, Francis Bacon, Helen Frankenthaler, Dan Christensen, Larry Zox, Ronnie Landfield, Color Field painters, Lyrical Abstractionists and others. Staining acrylic paint into the fabric of cotton duck canvas was more benign and less damaging to the fabric of the canvas than the use of oil paint. In 1970, artist Helen Frankenthaler commented about her use of staining:

When I first started doing the stain paintings, I left large areas of canvas unpainted, I think, because the canvas itself acted as forcefully and as positively as paint or line or color. In other words, the very ground was part of the medium, so that instead of thinking of it as background or negative space or an empty spot, that area did not need paint because it had paint next to it. The thing was to decide where to leave it and where to fill it and where to say this doesn't need another line or another pail of colors. It's saying it in space.

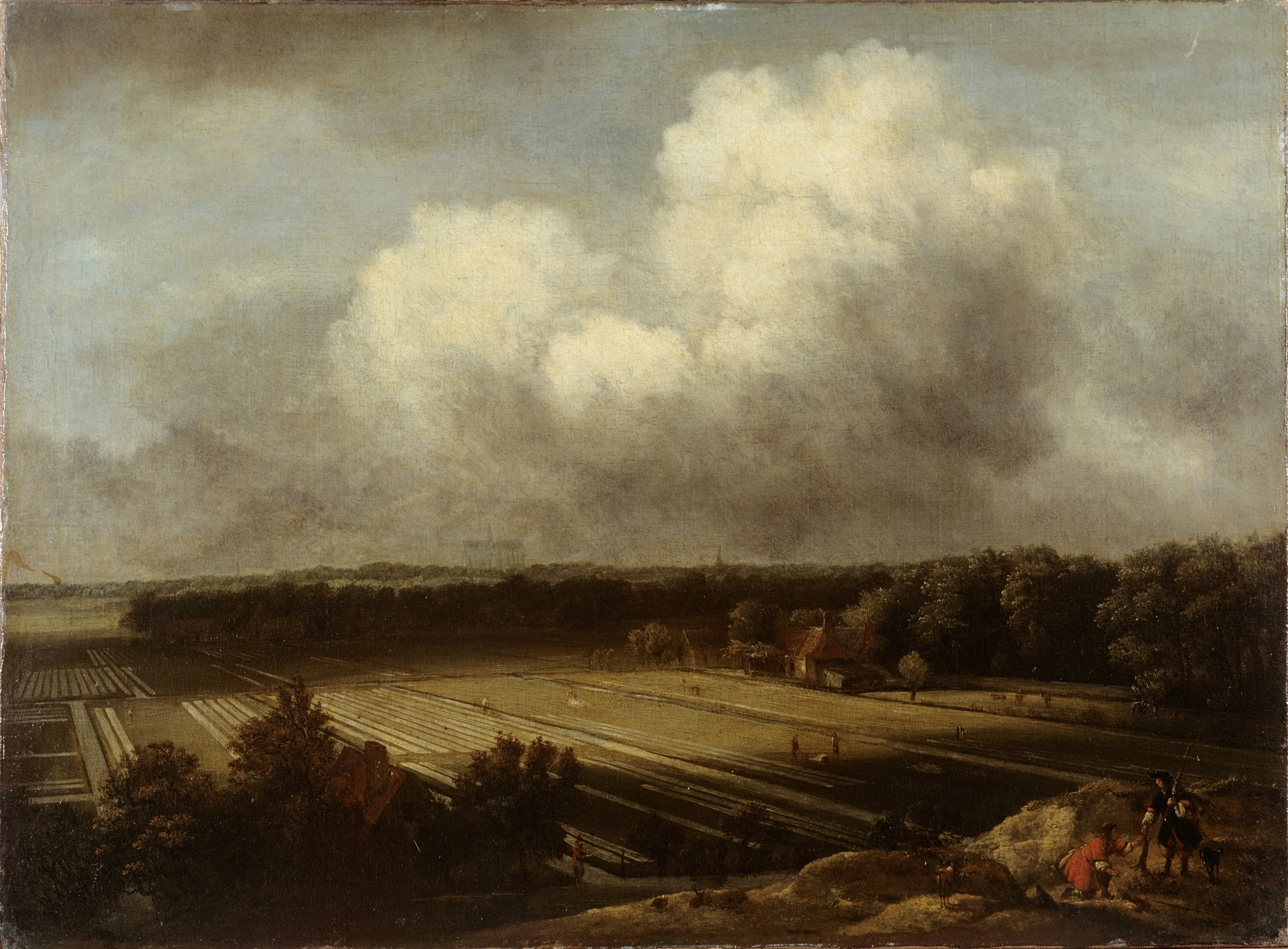
Bleaching-fields covered with sheets of new-made textiles, probably linen, very possibly canvas, 1670s near Haarlem in the Netherlands

Early canvas was made of linen, a sturdy brownish fabric of considerable strength. Linen is particularly suitable for the use of oil paint. In the early 20th century, cotton canvas, often referred to as "cotton duck", came into use. Linen remains popular with many professional artists, especially those who work with oil paint. Cotton duck, which stretches more fully and has an even, mechanical weave, offers a more economical alternative. The advent of acrylic paint has greatly increased the popularity and use of cotton duck canvas. Linen and cotton derive from two entirely different plants, the flax plant and the cotton plant, respectively.

Gessoed canvases on stretchers are also available. They are available in a variety of weights: light-weight is about 4 oz/yd^{2} (140 g/m^{2}) or 5 oz/yd^{2} (170 g/m^{2}); medium-weight is about 7 oz/yd^{2} (240 g/m^{2}) or 8 oz/yd^{2} (270 g/m^{2}); heavy-weight is about 10 oz/yd^{2} (340 g/m^{2}) or 12 oz/yd^{2} (410 g/m^{2}). They are prepared with two or three coats of gesso and are ready for use straight away. Artists desiring greater control of their painting surface may add a coat or two of their preferred gesso. Professional artists who wish to work on canvas may prepare their own canvas in the traditional manner.

One of the most outstanding differences between modern painting techniques and those of the Flemish and Dutch Masters is in the preparation of the canvas. "Modern" techniques take advantage of both the canvas texture as well as those of the paint itself. Renaissance masters took extreme measures to ensure that none of the texture of the canvas came through. This required a painstaking, months-long process of layering the raw canvas with (usually) lead-white paint, then polishing the surface, and then repeating. The final product had little resemblance to fabric, but instead had a glossy, enamel-like finish.

With a properly prepared canvas, the painter will find that each subsequent layer of color glides on in a "buttery" manner, and that with the proper consistency of application (fat over lean technique), a painting entirely devoid of brushstrokes can be achieved. A warm iron is applied over a piece of wet cotton to flatten the wrinkles.

Canvas can also be printed on using offset or specialist digital printers to create canvas prints. This process of digital inkjet printing is popularly referred to as Giclée. After printing, the canvas can be wrapped around a stretcher and displayed.

== For embroidery ==
Canvas is a popular base fabric for embroidery such as cross-stitch and Berlin wool work. Some specific types of embroidery canvases are Aida cloth (also called Java canvas), Penelope canvas, Chess canvas, and Binca canvas. Plastic canvas is a stiffer form of Binca canvas.

== As a compound agent ==
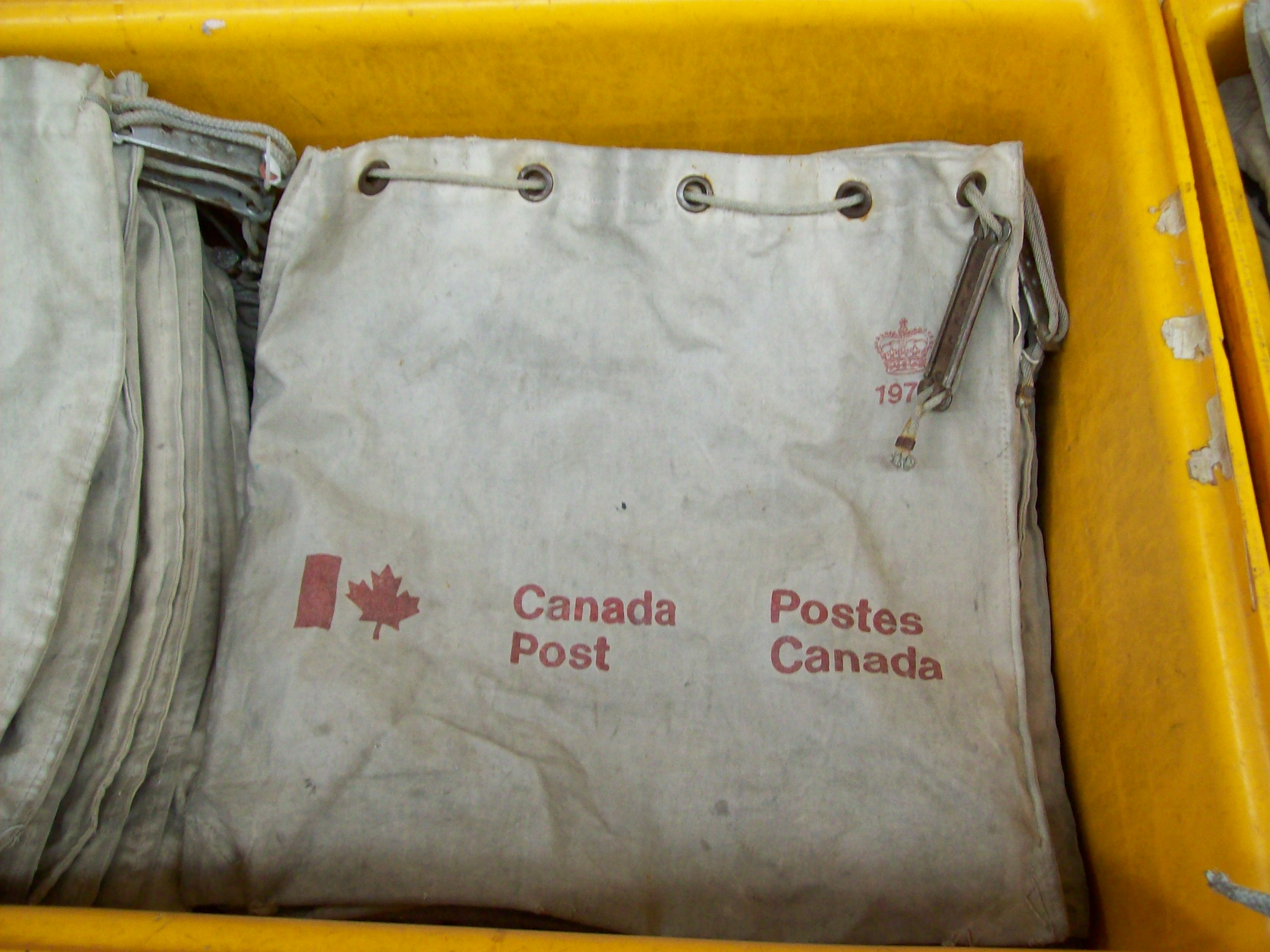
Canada Post canvas bags

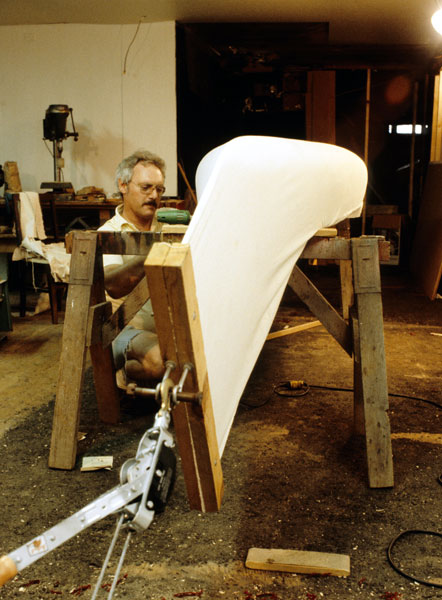
Stretching canvas on a canoe

From the 13th century onwards, canvas was used as a covering layer on pavise shields. The canvas was applied to the wooden surface of the pavise, covered with multiple layers of gesso and often richly painted in tempera technique. Finally, the surface was sealed with a transparent varnish. While the gessoed canvas was a perfect painting surface, the primary purpose of the canvas application may have been the strengthening of the wooden shield corpus in a manner similar to modern glass-reinforced plastic.

== Splined canvas, stretched canvas and canvas boards ==
Splined canvases differ from traditional side-stapled canvas in that canvas is attached with a spline at the rear of the frame. This allows the artist to incorporate painted edges into the artwork itself without staples at the sides, and the artwork can be displayed without a frame. Splined canvas can be restretched by adjusting the spline.

Stapled canvases stay stretched tighter over a longer period of time, but are more difficult to re-stretch when the need arises.

Canvas boards are made of canvas stretched over and glued to a cardboard backing, and sealed on the backside. The canvas is typically linen primed for a certain type of paint. They are primarily used by artists for quick studies.

== Types ==
- Dyed canvas
- Fire-proof canvas
- Printed canvas
- Stripe canvas
- Water-resistant canvas
- Waterproof canvas
- Waxed canvas
- Rolled canvas

== Mechanical properties in canvas conservation ==
Understanding the mechanical properties of art canvases is necessary for art conservation, especially when deciding on transporting paintings, conservation treatments and environmental specifications inside museums. Canvases are layered structures made from weaving fibers together, where each layer responds differently to changes in humidity, resulting in localized stresses that cause deformation, cracking, and delamination. There are two directions to the canvas: the warp direction (threads run vertically) and the weft direction (threads run horizontally). Researchers performed tensile testing to determine the effects of humidity on the strength of canvases and observed that increasing humidity decreased the effective elastic modulus (combined modulus of the weft and warp directions). For example, the effective modulus at 30% relative humidity is 180 MPa, which drops to 13 MPa at 90% relative humidity, suggesting that canvas is becoming more flexible and susceptible to deformation. There is an inherent anisotropy to the elastic modulus measured in the weft and warp direction as evidenced in the strain vs. load behavior of the canvas. The canvas exhibits a 0.1 strain in the weft direction and 0.2 strain in the warp direction before failing (thread ripping apart). Though, tensile testing provides an explicit measure of material strength, conservators are unable to tare a piece of painting to create the samples (required length of 250 mm), therefore the traditional methods of assessing mechanical properties have been visual cues and pH values.

Art conservators have recently adopted a new method called zero-span strength analysis, nanoindentation, and numerical modelling to quantitatively evaluate the mechanical properties of painting canvases. Zero-span strength analysis measures the tensile strength of materials, such as paper and yarns, by reducing the clamping distance to 0.1 mm and applying load to a particular point on the yarn. This minimizes effects from material geometry and accurately assesses intrinsic fiber strength. This also reduces the amount of material needed for samples to 60 mm. Using zero-span strength analysis, conservators measured tensile strength of flax, commonly used canvas material in historical paintings and correlated tensile strength to the degree of cellulose depolymerization — cellulose is a component of flax. Another method for assessing canvas quality is nanoindentation utilizing a millimeter-sized cantilever with a microsphere at its end and measuring local viscoelastic properties. However, with the nanoindentation method, conservators can probe the composite behavior of the layers of paint on top of the canvas, not the actual strength of the canvas itself. Lastly, conservators are using finite element modeling (FEM) and extended-FEM (XFEM) on canvases undergoing desiccation (removal of moisture) to visualize the global and local stresses.

== Products ==
- Wood-and-canvas canoes (see photo of canvas being stretched on a canoe)
- Bags, including coated canvas (e.g. Goyard)
- Non-disintegrating ammunition belts, which have evenly spaced pockets to allow the belt to be mechanically fed into the machine gun.
- Covers and tarpaulins
- Shoes (e.g. Converse, Vans, Keds)
- Tents
- Swags
- Martial arts uniforms (e.g. Tokaido, Shureido, Judogi)
- Canvas Prints
- Wrestling canvas, used in WWE and other Sports Entertainment promotions.
- Vests, often fishing, hunting, tactical/military
- Coats
- Jackets
- Vehicle seat covers

== See also ==
- Canvas print
- Eisengarn
- Marine canvas
- Plastic canvas
- Salembaree
