= Calder Gardens =

Sculpture garden and art museum

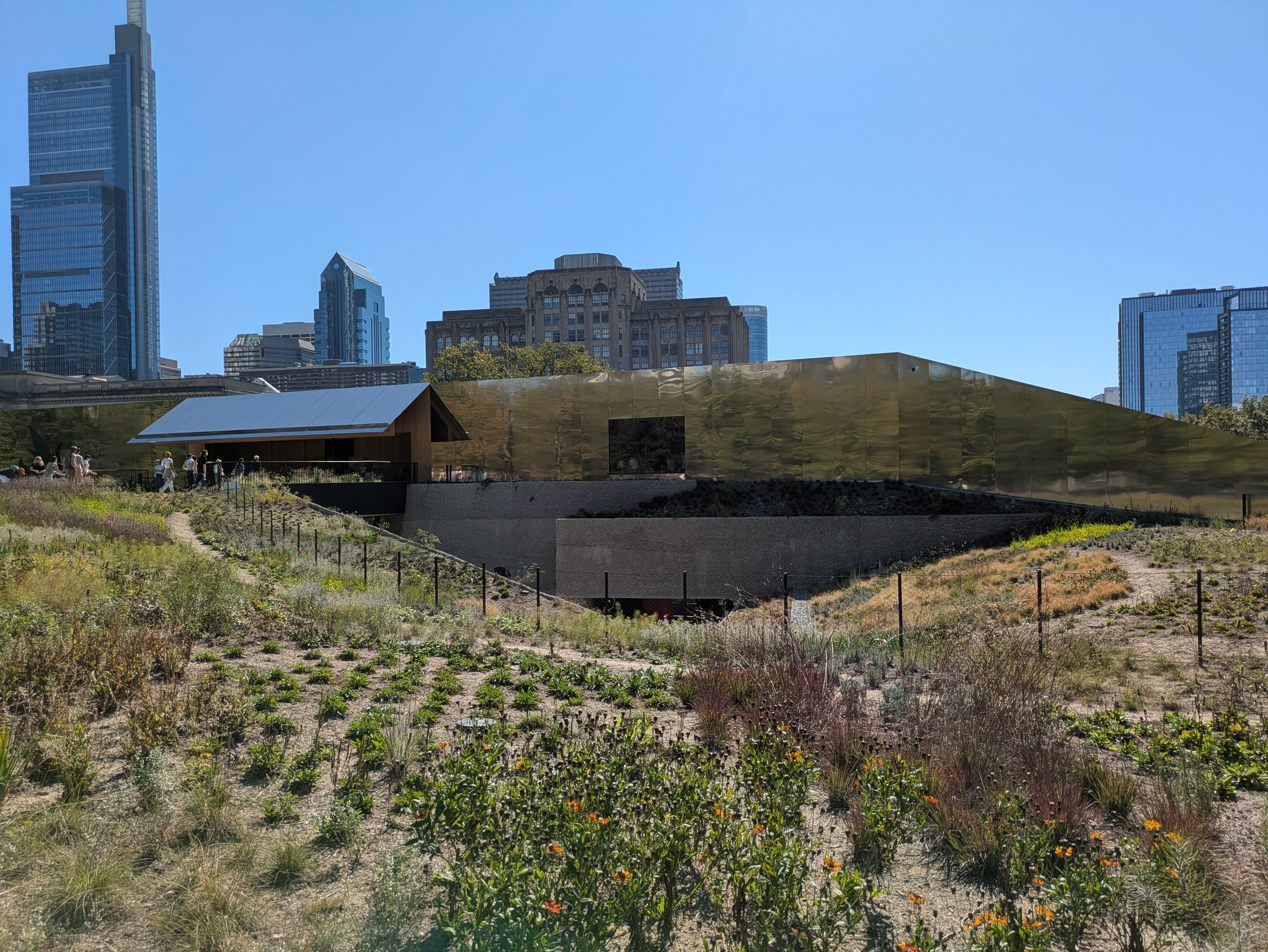
- Calder Gardens in 2025
- Established: 2025
- Location: Philadelphia, Pennsylvania, United States
- Type: Art museum
- Architect: Herzog & de Meuron
- Website: caldergardens.org

Calder Gardens is an art museum in Philadelphia dedicated to the work of sculptor Alexander Calder, opened in 2025. It sits on 1.8 acres (0.73 hectares) of land on the city's Benjamin Franklin Parkway and includes indoor and outdoor spaces that feature Calder's work.

Jointly administered by the Calder Foundation and the nearby Barnes Foundation, Calder Gardens was designed by the architecture firm Herzog & de Meuron in collaboration with landscape designer Piet Oudolf and landscape architect Richard Herbert. Funding for the nearly $100 million project was provided by the city, the Commonwealth of Pennsylvania, and private donors.

== Background and history ==
=== Development ===
A museum dedicated to the Philadelphia–born sculptor Alexander Calder was first proposed by mayor Ed Rendell in 1998 as a collaboration between the city and the Calder Foundation, the family–run nonprofit which manages Calder's estate. Planning and fundraising commenced and a city–owned site was set aside on the Benjamin Franklin Parkway; a number of works by the artist were installed outdoors on the site in 2002 and 2004 and became known as the Calder Garden. Despite this, the project stalled and was announced as canceled in 2005, and the sculptures installed on the site were removed in 2009.

In the late 2010s, philanthropists in the city approached the foundation to propose restarting the project. Alexander S.C. Rower, Calder's grandson and the president of the foundation, said that he told supporters he did not want to build a traditional museum, instead envisioning "a place that’s meant for introspection, where you can be with art." The new project was announced in early 2020 with architecture firm Herzog & de Meuron chosen to design the building, with an original budget of $40 million. Businessman Joseph Neubauer and the Neubauer Family Foundation, key supporters of reviving the project, contributed a significant amount of funding, along with other private donors and foundations including The Pew Charitable Trusts and grants from the city and state. The schedule was soon delayed by the COVID-19 pandemic.

In 2022 the foundation revealed renderings of the museum design, featuring structures heavily integrated into the site's landscape, and announced that the gardens would be designed by Piet Oudolf along with landscape architect Richard Herbert. By this point, the budget was raised to $70 million. Construction was set to begin the same year with a projected opening date of early 2024, but the work was delayed until 2023 to allow the city to reroute a water main on the site.

In early 2025, the museum announced an adjusted opening date of Fall 2025 and appointed senior curatorial leadership, naming curator Juana Berrío as senior director of programs. The final budget for the museum was close to $100 million, with a total contribution of $20 million from the Commonwealth of Pennsylvania.

=== Opening and operations ===
The museum officially opened in September 2025. The primary ongoing exhibition at the museum is a rotating installation of works by Calder from throughout his career.

Museum leadership decided not to include explanatory wall texts or other didactic information in the museum, instead directing visitors to learn more about Calder via online sources. Rower and other museum leaders have said the institution hopes to emphasize the experience of viewing Calder's art in a tranquil setting, rather than foregrounding historical information about the artist or academic analyses of his art.

== Administration and programs ==
The museum is jointly administered by the Calder Foundation and the Barnes Foundation, an art museum located nearby on the Benjamin Franklin Parkway. Calder Gardens does not have a traditional permanent collection, instead drawing from the collection of the Calder Foundation and other institutions.

== Architecture ==
The 18,000 square feet (1,700 m^{2}) museum was designed by Swiss firm Herzog & de Meuron, who sought to avoid the monumental character of the surrounding museums on the Benjamin Franklin Parkway. Instead, the museum sits partially sunken under gardens designed Piet Oudolf, merging art, architecture, nature, and the urban fabric. According to Jacques Herzog, “Calder Gardens embodies a kind of ‘no-design’ architecture, allowing the works of art to express their diversity and ambiguity across numerous different spatial contexts. It's a place where you can sit, wander, and observe, whether it's nature or art, with the ease one has when one sits under a tree.”

The museum is organized by two main structural elements. Firstly, a metal wall clad in darkened wood works as an acoustic barrier and holds the offices, a loading area and a small lobby. Secondly, a central circular disk that covers the galleries and generates the upper plaza. Once descended from the discreet lobby, visitors access the various galleries, framed by planes of concrete, wood, and standard drywall.

The gardens, which hold over 250 species, hold a variety of different landscapes grouped in patches, from woodlands to prairies, mixing native and exotic specimens.

== Reception ==
Critics reviewing the opening of the museum and its design were largely positive, with many approving of the institution's decision not to provide written interpretations of Calder's work as well as the design of the underground structure and gardens. Others criticized the building and gardens's relationship to the history and landscape on the parkway, objecting particularly to a perceived civic failure to make the institution more physically open to the public.

Willard Spiegelman commended the naturalistic feel of the museum space and didactic-free curatorial strategy, applauding the decision not to mediate the viewer's experience with Calder's work. Andrew Russeth wrote in The New York Times that the lack of didactics in the museum "may seem anti-intellectual" but argued that it allowed for an "undistracted" experience of Calder's art. In The Brooklyn Rail, Jessica Holmes praised the non-traditional structure and curatorial strategy of the museum, writing that they were largely in line with Calder's own philosophies. Holmes, along with Adam Gopnik writing in The New Yorker, argued that the design of the museum ensured that though underground, the interior spaces never felt confined or limited.

Critic Inga Saffron called the project's approach to its geographic site a success, saying that the architects had successfully managed to balance the relationship between the parkway on one side and the active interstate highway on the other side. Aaron Betsky, writing in Architect Magazine, approved of the museum's design and structure and said they offered a new model of presentation for more traditional art institutions to replicate.

In a negative review for The Guardian, Oliver Wainwright criticized the architects for overloading the design with ideas. He deemed the museum "tuned to our impatient age of spectacle" and said the experience in the space "can sometimes verge on Disneyish". Historian Michael J. Lewis was highly critical of the museum's perceived civic posture as a primarily underground building with limited public outdoor space and of the lack of attention paid to the visual or historic context of the site on the parkway. Izzy Kornblatt in Architectural Record described the execution of the museum's building as "impressive" but faulted the lack of publicly accessible spaces.

== See also ==
- List of Alexander Calder public works
- List of single-artist museums
- List of Herzog & de Meuron works
