= Alexander Calder =

American sculptor (1898–1976)

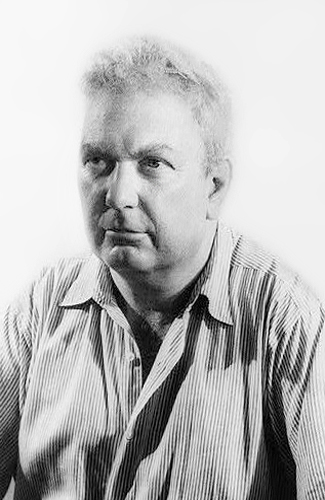
- Alexander Calder, by Carl Van Vechten, 1947
- Born: July 22, 1898; Philadelphia, Pennsylvania, U.S.
- Died: November 11, 1976 (aged 78); New York City, New York, U.S.
- Education: Stevens Institute of Technology (BS); Art Students League of New York (attended)
- Known for: Sculpture
- Movement: Kinetic art, surrealism, abstraction

Alexander Calder (/ˈkɔːldər/; July 22, 1898 – November 11, 1976) was an American sculptor known both for his innovative mobiles (kinetic sculptures powered by motors or air currents) that embrace chance in their aesthetic, his static "stabiles", and his monumental public sculptures. Calder preferred not to analyze his work, saying, "Theories may be all very well for the artist himself, but they shouldn't be broadcast to other people." His father, Alexander Stirling Calder, and grandfather, Alexander Milne Calder, were also sculptors.

== Early life and education ==
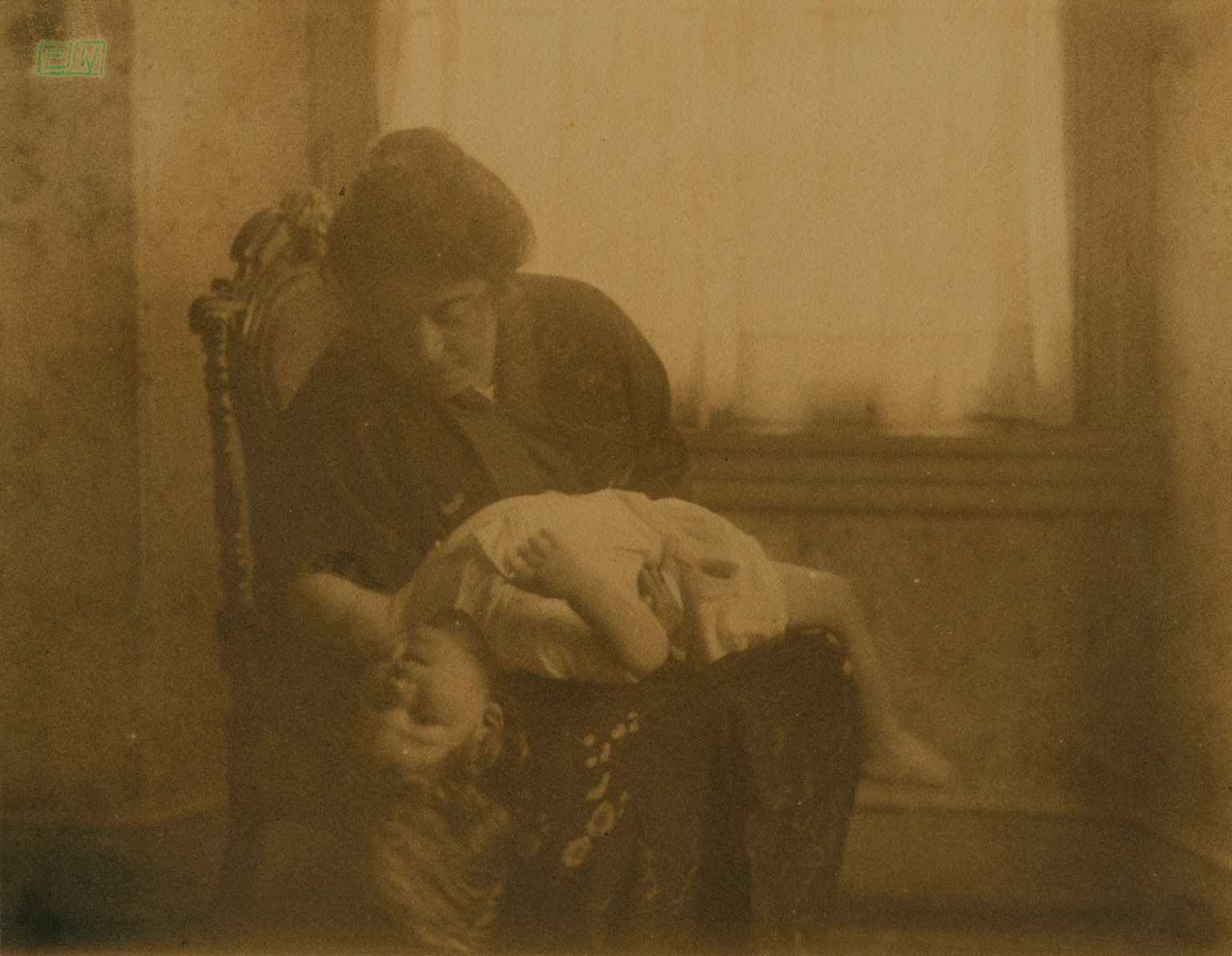
Nanette and Alexander Calder, photographed in 1900

Calder was born in 1898 in the Lawnton section of Philadelphia, Pennsylvania. His birthdate remains a source of confusion. According to Calder's mother, Nanette (née Lederer), Calder was born on August 22, yet his birth certificate at Philadelphia City Hall, based on a hand-written ledger, stated July 22. When Calder's family learned of the birth certificate, they asserted with certainty that city officials had made a mistake. His mother was Jewish of Bavarian descent and his father was Calvinist of Scottish descent, but Calder never practiced a religion and rejected nationalism.

Calder's grandfather, sculptor Alexander Milne Calder, was born in Scotland, had immigrated to Philadelphia in 1868, and is best known for the colossal statue of William Penn on Philadelphia City Hall's tower. His father, Alexander Stirling Calder, was a well-known sculptor who created many public installations, a majority of them in Philadelphia. Calder's mother was a professional portrait artist, who had studied at the Académie Julian and the Sorbonne in Paris from around 1888 until 1893. She moved to Philadelphia, where she met Stirling Calder while studying at the Pennsylvania Academy of the Fine Arts. Calder's parents married on February 22, 1895. Alexander Calder's sister, Margaret Calder Hayes, was instrumental in the development of the UC Berkeley Art Museum.

At the age of three, Calder posed nude for his father's sculpture Man Cub, a cast of which is in the Metropolitan Museum of Art in New York City. In 1902 he also completed his earliest sculpture, a clay elephant. In 1905 his father contracted tuberculosis, and Calder's parents moved to a ranch in Oracle, Arizona, leaving the children in the care of family friends for a year. The children were reunited with their parents in March 1906 and stayed at the Arizona ranch during that summer.

The Calder family moved from Arizona to Pasadena, California. The windowed cellar of the family home became Calder's first studio and he received his first set of tools. He used scraps of copper wire to make jewelry for his sister's dolls. On January 1, 1907, Nanette Calder took her son to the Tournament of Roses Parade in Pasadena, where he observed a four-horse-chariot race. This style of event later became the finale of Calder's miniature circus performances. Calder would create two small sculptures around this time, depicting a dog and a duck, both fashioned from brass sheet metal. The dog was ostensibly made by Calder while the family was in Pasadena as a Christmas gift for his parents. The small brass duck could be considered Calder's first mobile, as it featured a curved base that allowed it to rock when gently touched.

In late 1909, the family returned to Philadelphia, where Calder briefly attended Germantown Academy, before the family settled in Croton-on-Hudson, New York in 1910. During his high school years in Croton, Calder was befriended by his father's painter friend Everett Shinn, with whom he built a gravity-powered system of mechanical trains. Calder described it, "We ran the train on wooden rails held by spikes; a chunk of iron racing down the incline speeded the cars. We even lit up some cars with candle lights". After Croton, the Calders moved to Spuyten Duyvil in the Bronx to be closer to New York City, as Stirling Calder was renting a studio in Greenwich Village. While living in Spuyten Duyvil, Calder attended high school in nearby Yonkers. In 1912, Calder's father was appointed acting chief of the Department of Sculpture of the 1915 Panama–Pacific International Exposition in San Francisco, California, and began work on sculptures for it.

During Calder's high school years of 1912–1915, the family moved back and forth between New York and California. In each new location, Calder's parents reserved cellar space as a studio for their son. Near the end of this period, Calder stayed with friends in California while his parents moved back to New York, so that he could graduate from Lowell High School in San Francisco. Calder graduated from high school in the class of 1915.

== Career ==
Alexander Calder's parents did not want him to be an artist, so he decided to study mechanical engineering. An intuitive engineer since childhood, Calder did not even know what mechanical engineering was. "I was not very sure what this term meant, but I thought I'd better adopt it," he later wrote. He enrolled at the Stevens Institute of Technology in Hoboken, New Jersey, in 1915. When asked why he decided to study mechanical engineering instead of art Calder said, "I wanted to be an engineer because some guy I rather liked was a mechanical engineer, that's all". At Stevens, Calder was a member of the Delta Tau Delta fraternity and excelled in mathematics. He was well-liked and the class yearbook contained the following description, "Sandy is evidently always happy, or perhaps up to some joke, for his face is always wrapped up in that same mischievous, juvenile grin. This is certainly the index to the man's character in this case, for he is one of the best natured fellows there is."

In the summer of 1916, Calder spent five weeks training at the Plattsburgh Civilian Military Training Camp. In 1918, he joined the Student's Army Training Corps, Naval Section, at Stevens and was made guide of the battalion.

Calder received a degree from Stevens in 1919. He held a variety of jobs including hydraulic engineer and draughtsman for the New York Edison Company. In June 1922, Calder took a mechanic position on the passenger ship H. F. Alexander. While sailing from San Francisco to New York City, Calder slept on deck and awoke one early morning off the Guatemalan Coast and witnessed both the sun rising and the full moon setting on opposite horizons. He described in his autobiography, "It was early one morning on a calm sea, off Guatemala, when over my couch—a coil of rope—I saw the beginning of a fiery red sunrise on one side and the moon looking like a silver coin on the other."

The H.F. Alexander docked in San Francisco and Calder traveled to Aberdeen, Washington, where his sister and her husband, Kenneth Hayes, resided. Calder took a job as a timekeeper at a logging camp. The mountain scenery inspired him to write home to request paints and brushes. Shortly after this, Calder decided to move back to New York to pursue a career as an artist.

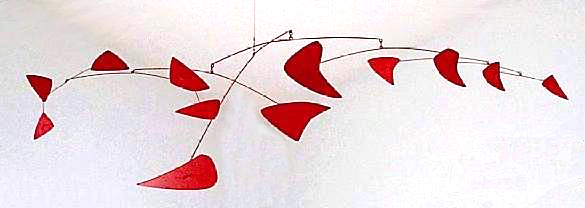
Red Mobile, 1956, Painted sheet metal and metal rods, a signature work by Calder – Montreal Museum of Fine Arts

In New York City, Calder enrolled at the Art Students League, studying briefly with George Luks, Boardman Robinson, and John Sloan. While a student, he worked for the National Police Gazette where, in 1925, one of his assignments was sketching the Ringling Bros. and Barnum & Bailey Circus. Calder became fascinated with the circus action, a theme that would reappear in his later work.

Calder moved to Paris in July 1926, travelling to Hull as a crew member of the British cargo steamship Galileo, then continuing by train and boat. He enrolled in the Académie de la Grande Chaumière, and established a studio at 22 rue Daguerre in Montparnasse, later moving to 7 villa Brune in the same district. In June 1929, while traveling by boat from Paris to New York, Calder met his future wife, Louisa James (1905–1996), a daughter of Edward Holton James and grandniece of author Henry James and philosopher William James. They married in 1931. While in Paris, Calder befriended a number of avant-garde artists, including Joan Miró, Fernand Léger, Jean Arp, and Marcel Duchamp. Leger wrote a preface for the catalogue of Calder's first exhibition of abstract constructions held at the Galerie Percier in 1931. Calder and Louisa returned to America in 1933 to a farmhouse they purchased in Roxbury, Connecticut, where they raised a family (Sandra born 1935, Mary born 1939). During World War II, Calder attempted to join the Marines as a camoufleur (see List of camoufleurs), but was rejected. In 1955 he and Louisa traveled through India for three months, where Calder produced nine sculptures as well as some jewelry.

In 1963, Calder settled into a new workshop, overlooking the valley of the Lower Chevrière to the village of Saché in Indre-et-Loire (France). He donated to the town a sculpture, which since 1974 has been situated in the town square. Throughout his artistic career, Calder named many of his works in French, regardless of where they were destined for eventual display. In 1966, Calder published his Autobiography with Pictures with the help of his son-in-law, Jean Davidson.

Calder died unexpectedly in November 1976 of a heart attack, shortly after the opening of a major retrospective show at the Whitney Museum in New York.

== Artistic work ==
=== Sculpture ===
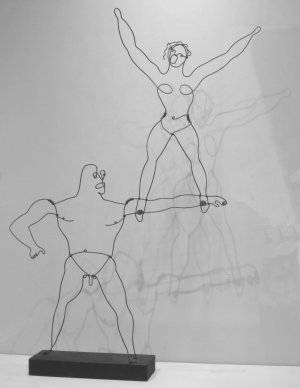
Hi! (Two Acrobats) by Alexander Calder, c. 1928, brass wire and wood, Honolulu Museum of Art

In Paris in 1926, Calder began to create Cirque Calder, a miniature circus fashioned from wire, cloth, string, rubber, cork, and other found objects. He likened his use of these miscellaneous objects, often old or discarded, to Kurt Schwitters' use of found objects in his artwork, describing Schwitter's Merz as the "[rejected], what is cast off". Designed to be transportable (it grew to fill five large suitcases), the circus was presented on both sides of the Atlantic. Soon, his Cirque Calder (on view at the Whitney Museum of American Art at present) became popular with the Parisian avant-garde. He also invented wire sculpture, or "drawing in space", and in 1929 had his first solo show of these sculptures in Paris at Galerie Billiet. Hi!, in the collection of the Honolulu Museum of Art, is an early example of the artist's wire sculpture. The painter Jules Pascin, a friend from the cafes of Montparnasse, wrote the preface to the catalog.

A visit to Piet Mondrian's studio in 1930, where he was impressed by the environment-as-installation, "shocked" him into fully embracing abstract art, toward which he had already been tending.

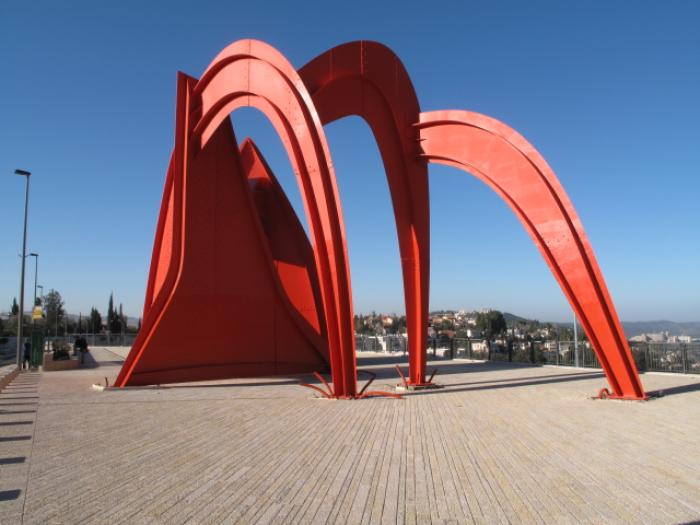
Homage to Jerusalem on Mount Herzl, Jerusalem, Israel

It was the mixture of his experiments to develop purely abstract sculpture following his visit with Mondrian that led to his first truly kinetic sculptures, actuated by motors, that would become his signature artworks. Calder's kinetic sculptures are regarded as being among the earliest manifestations of an art that consciously departed from the traditional notion of the art work as a static object and integrated the ideas of gesture and immateriality as aesthetic factors.

Dating from 1931, Calder's abstract sculptures of discrete movable parts powered by motors were christened "mobiles" by Marcel Duchamp, a French pun meaning both "motion" and "motive". However, Calder found that the motorized works sometimes became monotonous in their prescribed movements. His solution, arrived at by 1932, was hanging sculptures that derived their motion from touch or air currents. The earliest of these were made of wire, found objects, and wood, a material that Calder used since the 1920s. The hanging mobiles were followed in 1934 by outdoor standing mobiles in industrial materials, which were set in motion by the open air. The wind mobiles featured abstract shapes delicately balanced on pivoting rods that moved with the slightest current of air, allowing for a natural shifting play of forms and spatial relationships. Calder was also experimenting with self-supporting, static, abstract sculptures, dubbed "stabiles" by Jean Arp in 1932 to differentiate them from mobiles. At Exposition Internationale des Arts et Techniques dans la Vie Moderne (1937), the Spanish pavilion included Calder's sculpture Mercury Fountain.

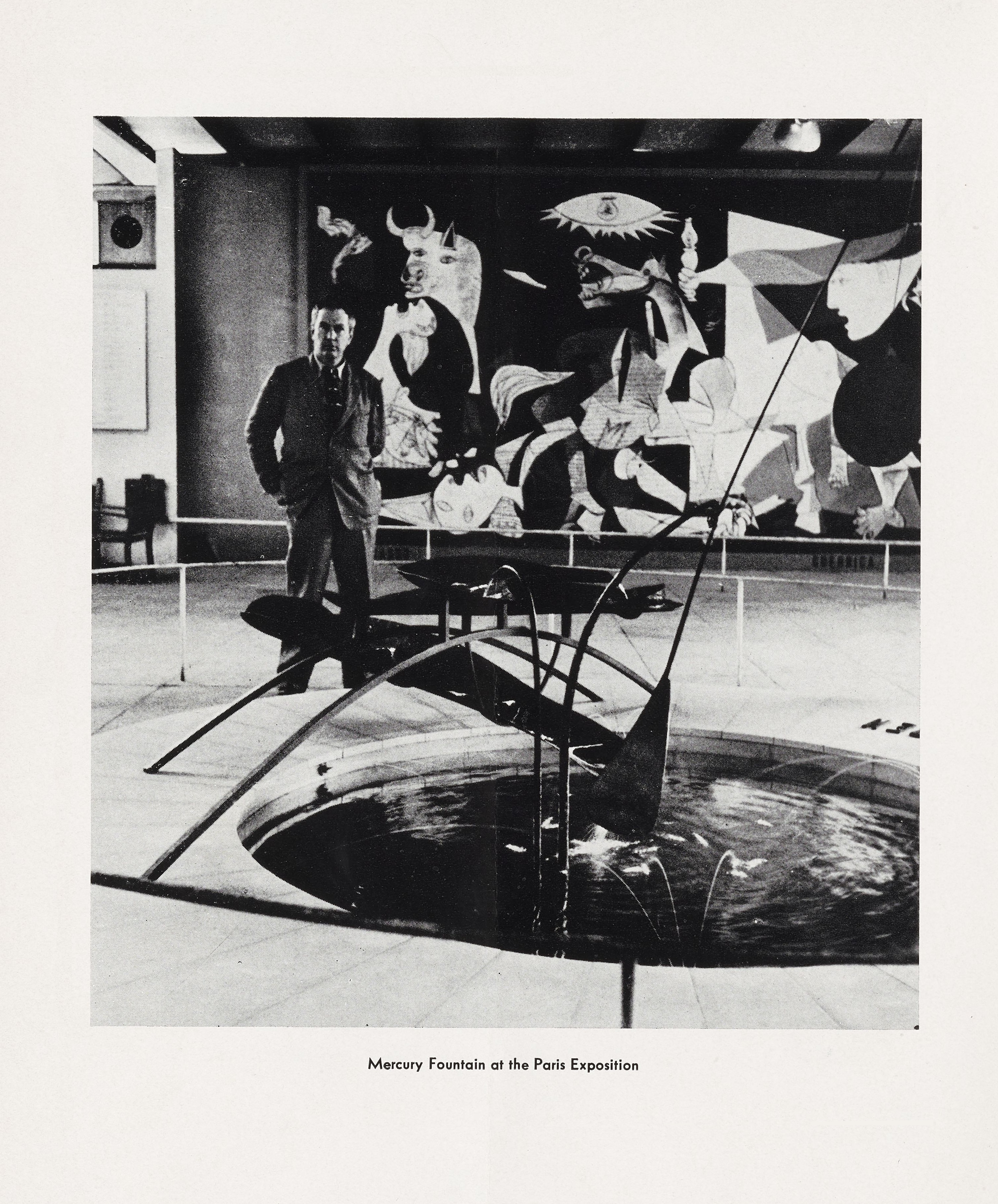
Calder, photographed in 1937 with his sculpture Mercury Fountain and Pablo Picasso's Guernica

During World War II, Calder continued to sculpt, adapting to a scarcity of aluminum during the war by returning to carved wood in a new open form of sculpture called "constellations". Postwar, Calder began to cut shapes from sheet metal into evocative forms and hand-paint them in his characteristically bold hues. Calder created a small group of works from around this period with a hanging base-plate, for example Lily of Force (1945), Baby Flat Top (1946), and Red is Dominant (1947). He also made works such as Seven Horizontal Discs (1946), which, like Lily of Force (1945) and Baby Flat Top (1946), he was able to dismantle and send by mail for his upcoming show at Galerie Louis Carré in Paris, despite the stringent size restrictions imposed by the postal service at the time. His 1946 show at Carré, which was organized by Duchamp, was composed mainly of hanging and standing mobiles, and it made a huge impact, as did the essay for the catalogue by French philosopher Jean-Paul Sartre. In 1951, Calder devised a new kind of sculpture, related structurally to his constellations. These "towers", affixed to the wall with a nail, consist of wire struts and beams that jut from the wall, with moving objects suspended from their armatures.

While not denying Calder's power as a sculptor, an alternate view of the history of twentieth-century art cites Calder's turning away in the early 1930s from his motor-powered works in favor of the wind-driven mobile as marking a decisive moment in Modernism's abandonment of its earlier commitment to the machine as a critical and potentially expressive new element in human affairs. According to this viewpoint, the mobile also marked an abandonment of Modernism's larger goal of a rapprochement with science and engineering, and with unfortunate long-term implications for contemporary art.

=== Monumental sculptures ===
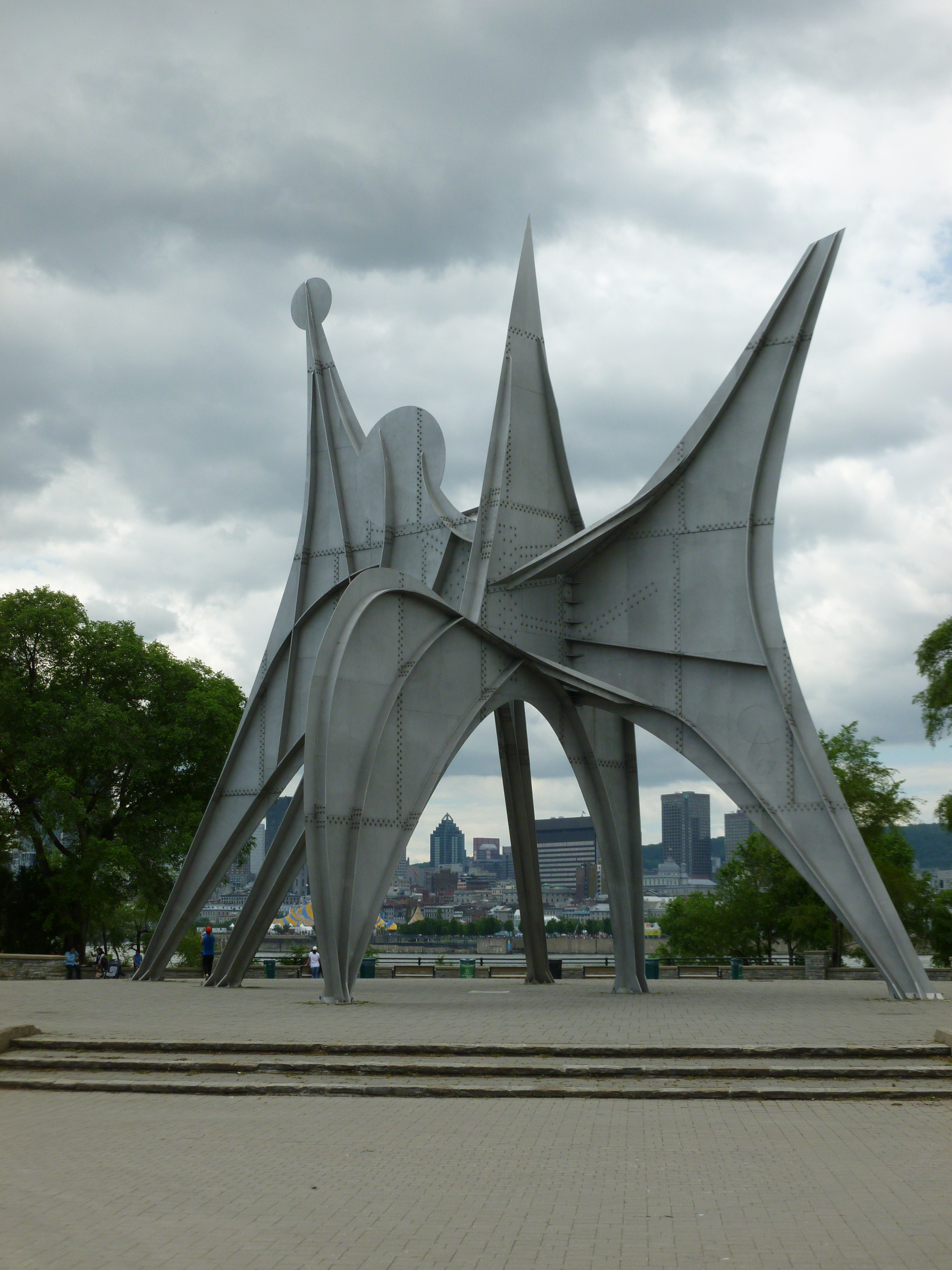
Trois disques, a sculpture by Alexander Calder for Expo 67, on Saint Helen's Island Parc Jean-Drapeau, Montreal, Quebec, Canada

In 1934, Calder made his first outdoor works in his Roxbury, Connecticut studio, using the same techniques and materials as his smaller works. Exhibited outside, Calder's initial standing mobiles moved elegantly in the breeze, bobbing and swirling in natural, spontaneous rhythms. The first few outdoor works were too delicate for strong winds, which forced Calder to rethink his fabrication process. By 1936 he changed his working methods and began to create smaller-scale maquettes that he then enlarged to monumental size. The small maquette, the first step in the production of a monumental sculpture, was considered by Calder a sculpture in its own right. Larger works used the classic enlargement techniques of traditional sculptors, including his father and grandfather. Drawing his designs on craft paper, he enlarged them using a grid. His large-scale works were created according to his exact specifications, while also allowing him the liberty to adjust or correct a shape or line if necessary.

In the 1950s, Calder concentrated more on producing monumental sculptures (his agrandissements period), and public commissions increasingly came his way in the 1960s. Notable examples are .125 (1957) for JFK Airport in New York, Spirale (1958) for UNESCO in Paris, and Trois disques, commissioned for Expo 67 in Montreal, Quebec, Canada. Calder's largest sculpture, at 25.8 metres (85 ft) high, was El Sol Rojo, constructed outside the Estadio Azteca for the 1968 Summer Olympics "Cultural Olympiad" events in Mexico City. Many of his public art works were commissioned by renowned architects; for example, I.M. Pei commissioned La Grande Voile, a 25-ton, 40-foot-high (12 m) stabile sculpture for the Massachusetts Institute of Technology in 1966.

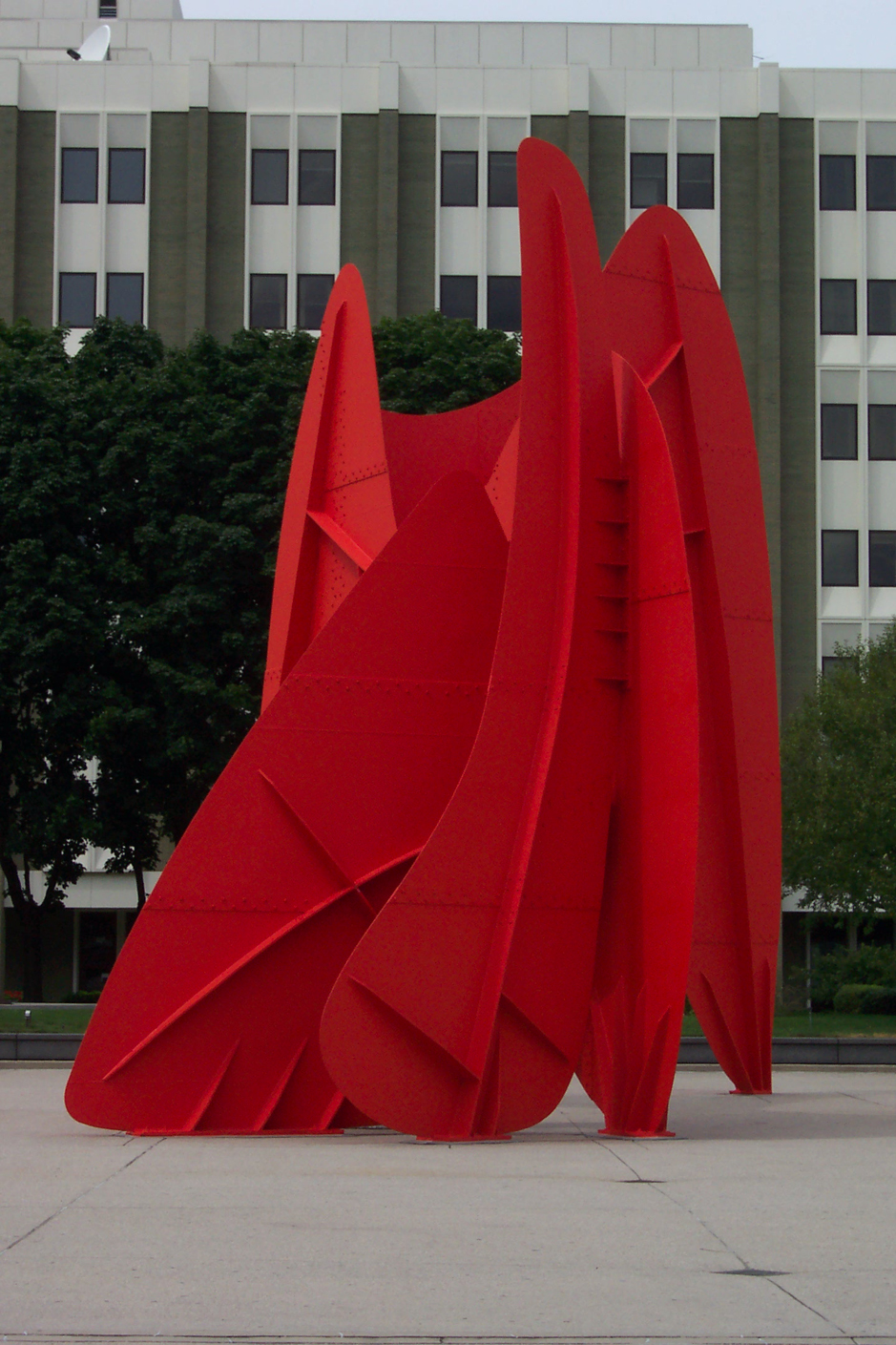
Calder's La Grande Vitesse (1969), Grand Rapids, Michigan

Most of Calder's monumental stationary and mobile sculptures were made after 1962 at Etablissements Biémont in Tours, France. He would create a model of his work, the engineering department would scale it up under Calder's direction, and technicians would complete the actual metalwork — all under Calder's watchful eye. Stabiles were made in steel plate, then painted. An exception was Trois disques, in stainless steel at 24 metres (79 ft) tall, commissioned by International Nickel Company of Canada.

In 1958, Calder asked Jean Prouvé to construct the steel base of Spirale in France, a monumental mobile for the UNESCO site in Paris, while the top was fabricated in Connecticut.

In June 1969, Calder attended the dedication of his monumental "stabile" sculpture La Grande Vitesse in Grand Rapids, Michigan. This sculpture is notable for being the first civic sculpture in the United States to receive funding from the National Endowment for the Arts.

In 1971, Calder created his Bent Propeller which was installed at the entrance of the World Trade Center's North Tower in New York City. When Battery Park City opened, the sculpture was moved to Vesey and Church Streets. The sculpture stood in front of 7 World Trade Center until it was destroyed on September 11, 2001. In 1973, the 63-foot-tall (19 m) vermillion-colored public art sculpture Four Arches was installed on Bunker Hill, Los Angeles to serve as "a distinctive landmark". The plaza site was designed in tiers to maximize the sculpture's visual effects.

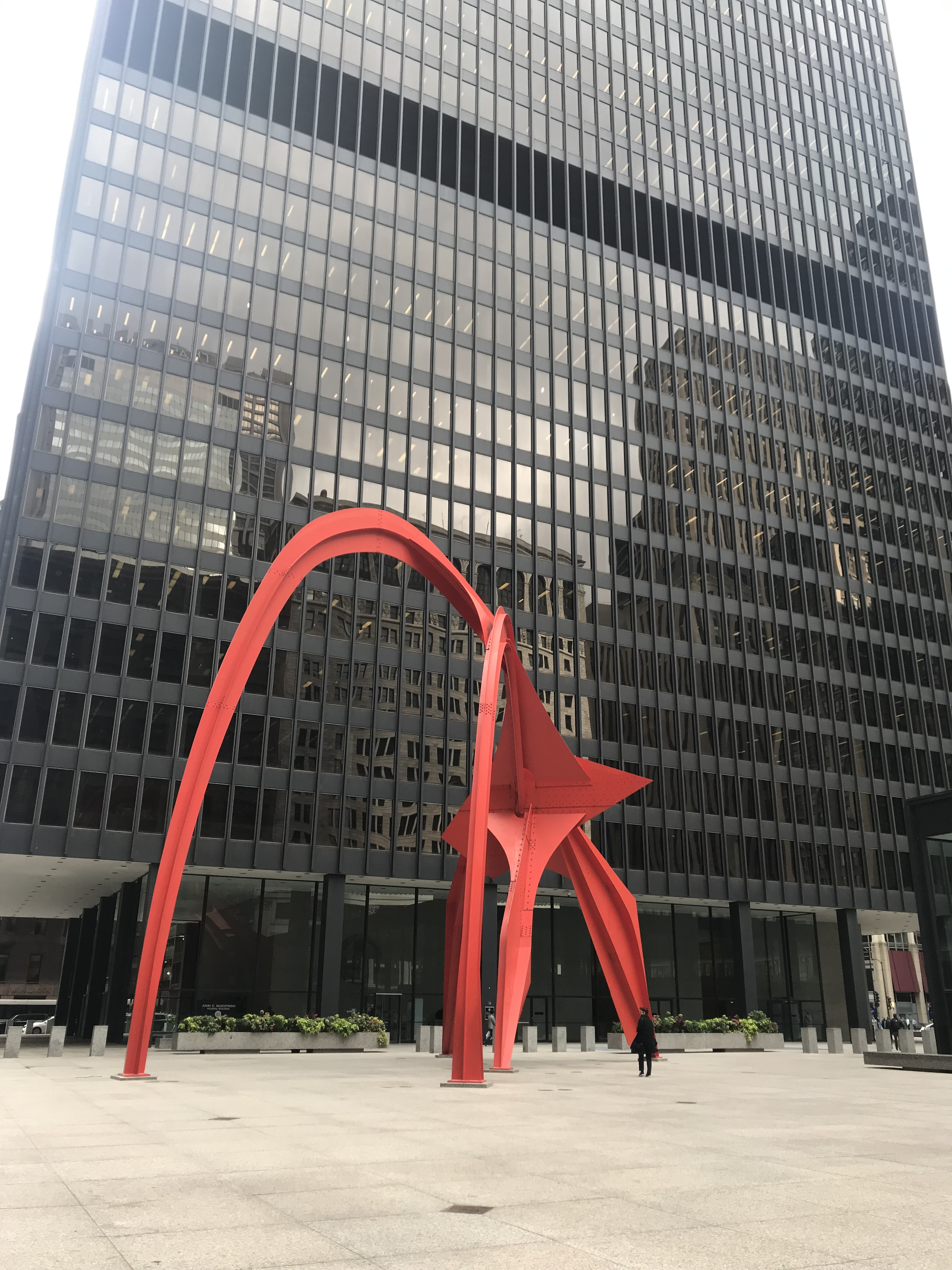
Calder's sculpture 'Flamingo', 1974

In 1974, Calder unveiled two sculptures, Flamingo at Federal Plaza and Universe at Sears Tower, in Chicago, Illinois, accompanied by the exhibition Alexander Calder: A Retrospective Exhibition, at the Museum of Contemporary Art, Chicago which opened simultaneously with the unveiling of the sculptures.

Originally meant to be constructed in 1977 for the Hart Senate Office Building, Mountains and Clouds was not built until 1985 due to government budget cuts. The massive sheet-metal project, weighing 35 tons, spans the nine-story height of the building's atrium in Washington, D.C. Calder designed the maquette for the United States Senate in the last year of his life.

=== Theatrical productions ===
Calder created stage sets for more than a dozen theatrical productions, including Nucléa, Horizon, and most notably, Martha Graham's Panorama (1935), a production of the Erik Satie symphonic drama Socrate (1936), and later, Works in Progress (1968). Works in Progress was a "ballet" conceived by Calder himself and produced at the Rome Opera House, featuring an array of mobiles, stabiles, and large painted backdrops. Calder would describe some of his stage sets as dancers performing a choreography due to their rhythmic movement.

=== Painting and printmaking ===
In addition to sculptures, Calder painted throughout his career, beginning in the early 1920s. He picked up his study of printmaking in 1925, and continued to produce illustrations for books and journals. His projects from this period include pen-and-ink line drawings of animals for a 1931 publication of Aesop's fables. As Calder's sculpture moved into the realm of pure abstraction in the early 1930s, so did his prints. The thin lines used to define figures in the earlier prints and drawings began delineating groups of geometric shapes, often in motion. Calder also used prints for advocacy, as in poster prints from 1967 and 1969 protesting the Vietnam War.

As Calder's professional reputation expanded in the late 1940s and 1950s, so did his production of prints. Masses of lithographs based on his gouache paintings were marketed, and deluxe editions of plays, poems, and short stories illustrated with fine art prints by Calder became available.

=== Painted aircraft and automobile ===
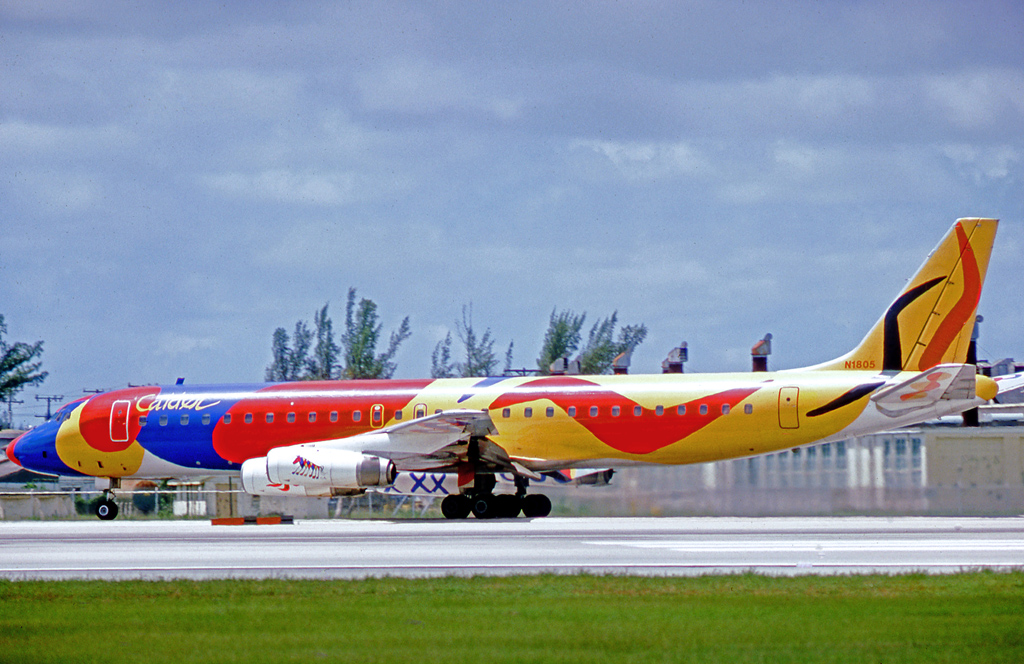
Calder's South American-themed design applied to a Braniff Douglas DC-8-62 taken at Miami Airport in 1975

One of Calder's more unusual undertakings was a commission from Dallas-based Braniff International Airways to paint a full-size Douglas DC-8-62 four-engined jet as a "flying canvas". George Stanley Gordon, founder of the New York City advertising agency Gordon and Shortt, approached Calder with the idea of painting a jet in 1972, but Calder responded that he did not paint toys. When Gordon told him it was a real, full-sized airliner he was proposing, the artist immediately gave his approval. Gordon felt that Braniff, known for melding the worlds of fashion and design with the world of aviation, would be the perfect company to carry out the idea. Braniff Chairman Harding Lawrence was highly receptive and a contract was drawn up in 1973 calling for the painting of one Douglas DC-8-62 jet liner, dubbed Flying Colors, and 50 gouaches for a total price of $100,000. Two years later, Braniff asked Calder to design a flagship for their fleet celebrating the U.S. Bicentennial. That piece, a Boeing 727–291 jet N408BN called the Flying Colors of the United States, and nicknamed the 'Sneaky Snake' by its pilots (based on quirky flight tendencies), featured a rippled image of red, white and blue echoing a waving American flag. A third design, to be dubbed Salute to Mexico, was commissioned but went uncompleted following his death.

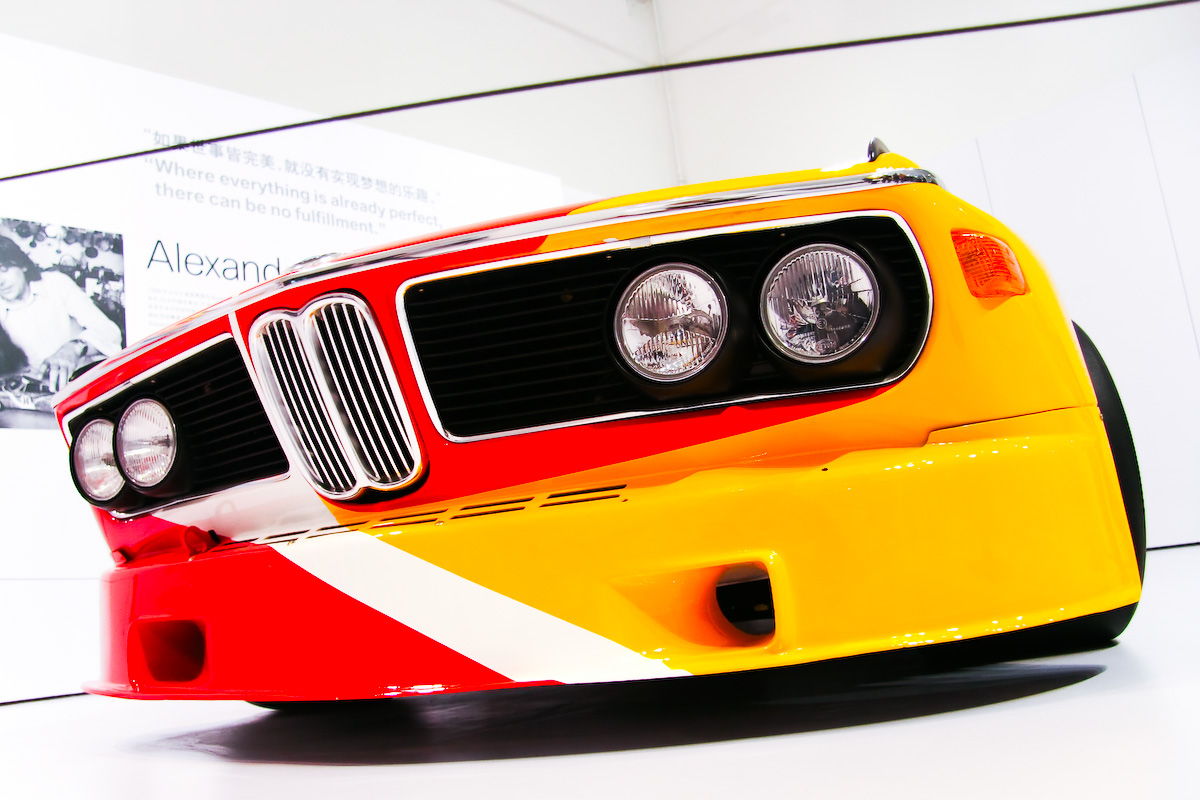
1975 BMW 3.0 CSL painted by Calder

In 1975 Calder was commissioned to paint a BMW 3.0 CSL automobile, which would be the first vehicle in the BMW Art Car Project.

=== Jewelry ===
Calder created over 2,000 pieces of jewelry over the course of his career, many as gifts for friends. Several pieces reflect his fascination with art from Africa and other continents. They were mostly made of brass and steel, with bits of ceramic, wood and glass. Calder rarely used solder; when he needed to join strips of metal, he linked them with loops, bound them with snippets of wire or fashioned rivets. Calder created his first pieces in 1906 at the age of eight for his sister's dolls using copper wire that he found in the street.

For his lifelong friend Joan Miró, Calder set a shard of a broken porcelain vessel in a brass ring. In 1935, while collaborating on stage sets with Martha Graham for Graham's modern dance works Panorama and Horizons, Calder presented the "mother of modern dance" with an elaborate hair pin which Graham kept until her death in 1991, as well as numerous other jewelry that Graham was photographed wearing during her performance of Judith in 1950. Peggy Guggenheim received enormous silver mobile earrings and later commissioned a hammered silver headboard that shimmered with dangling fish. In 1942, Guggenheim wore one Calder earring and one by Yves Tanguy to the opening of her New York gallery, The Art of This Century, to demonstrate her equal loyalty to Surrealist and abstract art, examples of which she displayed in separate galleries. Others who were presented with Calder's pieces were the artist's close friend, Georgia O'Keeffe; Teeny Duchamp, wife of Marcel Duchamp; Jeanne Rucar, wife of the filmmaker Luis Buñuel; and Bella Rosenfeld, wife of Marc Chagall.

== Exhibitions ==
Calder room at National Gallery of Art in Washington, D.C.

Calder's first solo exhibition was in 1927 at the Gallery of Jacques Seligmann in Paris. His first solo show in a US commercial gallery was in 1928 at the Weyhe Gallery in New York City. He exhibited with the Abstraction-Création group in Paris in 1933.

In 1935, he had his first solo museum exhibition in the United States at The Renaissance Society at the University of Chicago. In New York, he was championed from the early 1930s by the Museum of Modern Art, and was one of three Americans to be included in Alfred H. Barr Jr.'s 1936 exhibition Cubism and Abstract Art.

Calder's first retrospective was held in 1938 at George Walter Vincent Smith Gallery in Springfield, Massachusetts. In 1943, the Museum of Modern Art hosted a Calder retrospective, curated by James Johnson Sweeney and Marcel Duchamp; the show had to be extended due to the number of visitors. Calder was one of 250 sculptors who exhibited in the 3rd Sculpture International held at the Philadelphia Museum of Art in the summer of 1949. His mobile, International Mobile was the centerpiece of the exhibition. Calder also participated in documentas I (1955), II (1959), III (1964). Major retrospectives of his work were held at the Solomon R. Guggenheim Museum, New York (1964), the Fondation Maeght in Saint-Paul-de-Vence, France (1969), and the Museum of Contemporary Art, Chicago (1974). In addition, both of Calder's dealers, Galerie Maeght in Paris and the Perls Galleries in New York, averaged about one Calder show each per year.

In 2008, the Metropolitan Museum of Art exhibited Calder Jewelry, the first museum exhibit devoted solely to Calder's jewelry. The exhibit displayed a wide range of jewelry (bracelets, earrings and tiara) that Calder made as gifts for family and friends.

In 2024, the National Gallery of Art displayed Alexander Calder: A Survey.

From April 15 to August 16, 2026, the Fondation Louis Vuitton is expected to exhibit Calder. Rêver en Equilibre (Calder. Dreaming in Equilibrium) which celebrates the centenary of Calder's arrival in Paris and the fifty years since his death. The retrospective includes works from throughout Calder's career complemented by works by some of his friends and fellow artists, including Jean Arp, Barbara Hepworth, Jean Hélion, and Piet Mondrian.

== Collections ==
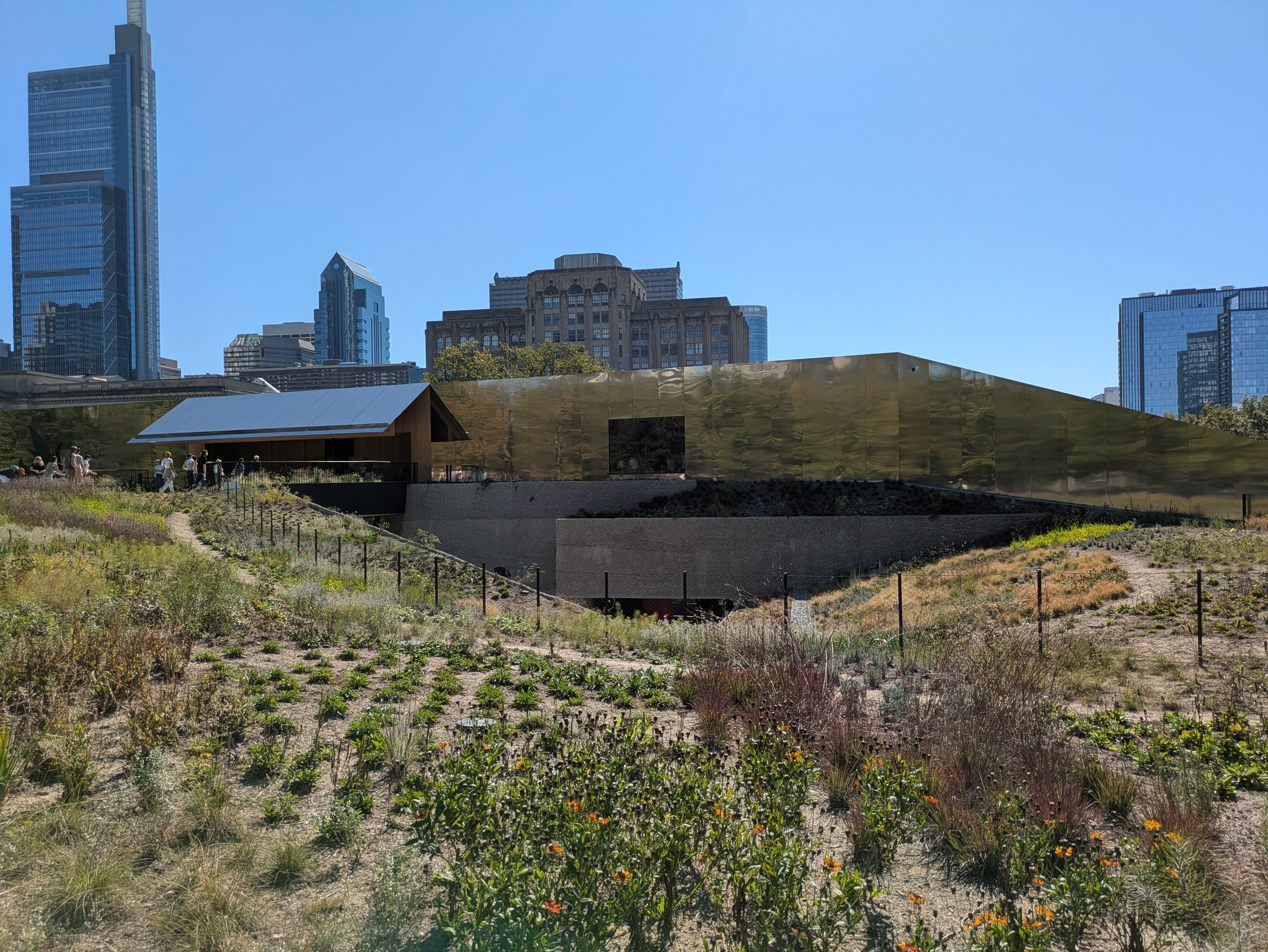
Calder Gardens in Philadelphia

Calder's work is in many permanent collections across the world. The Whitney Museum of American Art, New York, has the largest body of work by Alexander Calder. Other museum collections in the United States and Europe include the Solomon R. Guggenheim Museum, New York; the Museum of Modern Art, New York; the Centre Georges Pompidou, Paris; the Museo Nacional Centro de Arte Reina Sofía, Madrid; the Seattle Art Museum; and the National Gallery of Art, Washington, D.C. There are two pieces on display in the Governor Nelson A. Rockefeller Empire State Plaza Art Collection in Albany, NY.

The Philadelphia Museum of Art offers a view of works by three generations of Alexander Calders. From the second floor window on the east side of the Great Stair Hall (on the opposite side from the armor collection) there is behind the viewer Calder's own Ghost mobile, ahead on the street is the Swann Memorial Fountain by his father, A. Stirling Calder, and beyond that the statue of William Penn atop City Hall by Calder's grandfather, Alexander Milne Calder.

Across Latin America, Calder's work can be found in public collections and spaces. In Chile, the Museo de la Solidaridad Salvador Allende in Santiago has in its permanent collection both a mobile sculpture and a drawing. In Colombia, the Museo Botero in Bogotá displays both a mobile sculpture and an oil painting. In Mexico, the monumental sculpture The Red Sun (1968) is placed within the premises of the Estadio Azteca in Mexico City. The Central University of Venezuela, in Caracas, houses a mobile, two sculptures, and the Floating Clouds (1953) artwork which is part of the UNESCO World Heritage site.

=== Calder Gardens ===
Calder Gardens is a 1.8-acre indoor-outdoor center dedicated to Calder featuring several of his works. Located on Philadelphia's Benjamin Franklin Parkway, it opened on September 21, 2025. Juana Berrío has been named as Senior Director of Programs.

== Recognition and awards ==
- 1939 – Won first prize in a Museum of Modern Art competition entitled "Plexiglass Sculpture Competition".
- 1952 – Was one of eleven American artists chosen to represent their country at an Institute of Contemporary Arts-sponsored international sculpture competition on the theme "The Unknown Political Prisoner".
- 1952 – Represented the United States at the Venice Biennale and was awarded the main prize for sculpture
- 1958 – First Prize for Sculpture at the Pittsburgh International
- 1958 – Awarded the Carnegie Prize gold medal in sculpture by the Carnegie Museum of Art for Pittsburgh (1958)
- 1959 – Award with Carlos Raúl Villanueva at IV Bienal, Museu de Arte Moderna, Exposição Internacional de Arquitetura
- 1960 – National Institute of Arts and Letters, insignia
- 1960 – Gold Medal of Honor, the Architectural League of New York, for sculpture at UNESCO
- 1961 – American Institute of Architects Fine Arts Award
- 1962 – Art in America Annual Award for Outstanding Contribution to American Art (shared with Alfred H. Barr, Jr.)
- 1962 – Brandeis University Creative Arts Award for Sculpture
- 1963 – President's Medal, Art Director's Club
- 1963 – Edward MacDowell Medal for contributions to visual arts, awarded by MacDowell
- 1964 – Elected to American Academy of Arts and Letters
- 1966 – St. Botolph Distinguished Artist Award
- 1966 – Honorary Doctor of Arts degree, Harvard University
- 1967 – Honorary Sponsor, Philadelphia International Festival of Short Films
- 1968 – Officier de la Légion d'honneur, Ministry of Culture, France
- 1968 – New York State Award
- 1969 – Honorary Doctor of Engineering Degree, Stevens Institute of Technology
- 1969 – Key to the City of Grand Rapids, Michigan
- 1969 – Granted the same droit de suite rights as French authors
- 1969 – Honorary Degree of Doctor of Arts, Grand Valley State College
- c.1970 – Monnaie de Paris, 2 Calder coins
- 1971 – The Gold Medal for Sculpture, National Institute of Arts and Letters and the American Academy of Arts and Letters
- 1973 – Honorary Degree, Doctor of Fine Arts, University of Hartford
- 1974 – Appointed Commander of the French Legion of Honor
- 1974 – Saint Pierre des Corps
- 1974 – Citoyen d'Honneur, Commune de Sáche, France
- 1974 – October 25 is named as "Alexander Calder Day" in Chicago by Mayor Richard M. Daley. A festival was held on its inaugural celebration, with Calder receiving a Key to the City.
- 1974 – Honorary Citizen of Chicago
- 1974 – Grand Prix National des Art et Lettres, Ministry of Culture, France
- 1975 – U.N. Peace Medal
- 1975 – Liberty Bell, City of Philadelphia
- 1975 – United Nations Peace Medal
- 1976 – Official Cachet, presented to Calder as designer of the WFUNA Cachet on the first day of issue
- 1977 – Posthumously awarded Presidential Medal of Freedom
- 1977 – Goslarer Kaiserring
- 1983 – United States Mint issues a half-ounce gold medallion honoring Calder
- 1998 – US Postal Service issues a set of five 32-cent stamps honoring Calder

== Art market ==
In the late 1930s and early 1940s, Calder's works were not highly sought after, and when they sold, it was often for relatively little money. A copy of a Pierre Matisse sales ledger in the foundation's files shows that only a few pieces in the 1941 show found buyers, one of whom, Solomon R. Guggenheim, paid only $233.34 (equivalent to $5,108 in 2025) for a work. The Museum of Modern Art had bought its first Calder in 1934 for $60, after talking Calder down from $100. And yet by 1948 Calder nearly sold out an entire solo show in Rio de Janeiro, becoming the first internationally renowned sculptor. Galerie Maeght in Paris became Calder's exclusive Parisian dealer in 1950 and for the rest of Calder's life. After his New York dealer Curt Valentin died unexpectedly in 1954, Calder selected the Perls Galleries in New York as his new American dealer, and this alliance lasted until Calder's death.

In 2010, his metal mobile Untitled (Autumn Leaves) sold at Sotheby's New York for $3.7 million. Another mobile brought $6.35 million at Christie's later that year. Also at Christie's, a standing mobile called Lily of Force (1945), which was expected to sell for $8 to $12 million, was bought for $18.5 million in 2012. Calder's 7.5-foot-long hanging mobile Poisson volant (Flying Fish) (1957) fetched $25.9 million, setting an auction record for the sculptor at Christie's New York in 2014.

== Legacy ==
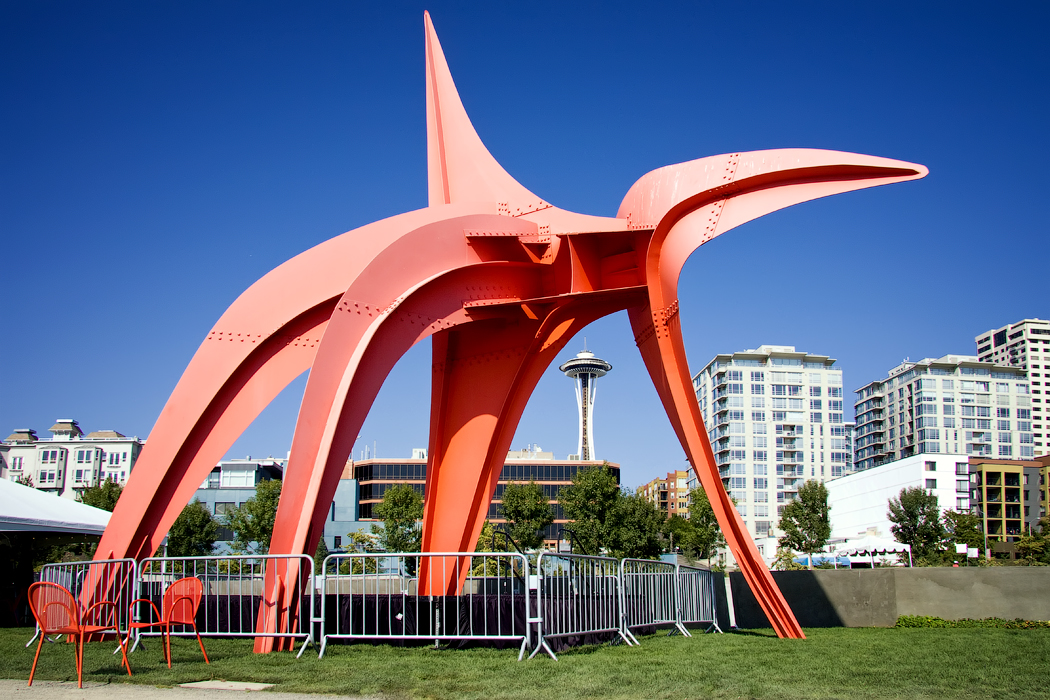
Eagle (1971). Olympic Sculpture Park, Seattle, Washington

Beginning in 1966, winners of the National Magazine Awards are awarded an "Ellie", a copper-colored stabile resembling an elephant, which was designed by Calder. Two months after his death, the artist was posthumously awarded the Presidential Medal of Freedom, the United States' highest civilian honor, by President Gerald Ford. However, representatives of the Calder family boycotted the January 10, 1977, ceremony "to make a statement favoring amnesty for Vietnam War draft resisters".

=== Calder Foundation ===
In 1987, the Calder Foundation was established by Calder's family, "dedicated to collecting, exhibiting, preserving, and interpreting the art and archives of Alexander Calder and [is] charged with an unmatched collection of his works". The foundation has large holdings, with some works owned by family members and others by foundation supporters. The art includes more than 600 sculptures including mobiles, stabiles, standing mobiles, and wire sculptures, and 22 monumental outdoor works, as well as thousands of oil paintings, works on paper, toys, pieces of jewelry, and domestic objects. After having worked mainly on cataloging Calder's works, the Calder Foundation is now focusing on organizing global exhibitions for the artist. One of Calder's grandsons, Alexander S. C. "Sandy" Rower, is the president of the foundation and other family members are on the board of trustees.

=== Authenticity issues ===
The Calder Foundation does not authenticate artworks; rather, owners can submit their works for registration in the Foundation's archive and for examination. The committee that performs examinations includes experts, scholars, museum curators, and members of the Calder family. The Calder Foundation's website provides details on the current policies and guidelines governing examination procedures.

In 1993, the owners of Rio Nero (1959), a sheet-metal and steel-wire mobile ostensibly by Calder, went to the United States District Court for the District of Columbia charging that it was not by Alexander Calder, as claimed by its seller. That same year, a federal judge ruled that for Rio Nero the burden of proof had not been fulfilled. Despite the decision, the owners of the mobile could not sell it because the recognized expert, Klaus Perls, had declared it a copy. The judge recognized the problem at the time, noting that Perls' pronouncement would make Rio Nero unsellable. In 1994, the Calder Foundation declined to include the mobile in the catalogue raisonné on the artist.

Referring to the Rio Nero case, the Appellate Division of the New York Supreme Court in 2009 rejected the appeal of an art collector who wished to sell a couple of stage sets that Calder had designed but did not live to see completed, which had been unsuccessfully submitted to the Calder Foundation for authentication. The court found that it did not have the power to declare the purported Calder work authentic, nor to order the Calder Foundation to include it in the catalogue raisonné.

In 1995, questions arose about another purported Calder, Two White Dots (not to be confused with the similarly named piece, Two White Dots in the Air, which Calder created in 1958). In 1973, Calder had created a 1-foot (0.30 m)-high sheet metal maquette for an unrealized stabile he called Two White Dots. He gave this maquette to Carmen Segretario, founder and owner of the Segré Foundry of Waterbury, Connecticut. For decades, Calder had utilized the services of Segré Foundry in manufacturing his mobiles and stabiles. Each piece (no matter how many copies were made) would be initialed personally by Calder in white chalk, after which a welder would follow the chalk marks to burn the initials into the work. Calder died in 1976, without a full-size version of Two White Dots having been made. In 1982, Segretario constructed a full-size version of Two White Dots, and sold it in 1983 to art dealer Shirley Teplitz for $70,000. Segetario's documentation claimed that the work had been fabricated around 1974 "under the supervision and direction of Artist". Two White Dots was then sold at auction in May 1984 for $187,000. Over the next decade, the piece was sold repeatedly. In 1995, Jon Shirley (the former president of Microsoft and a Calder collector) purchased Two White Dots for $1 million. When Shirley submitted the work to the Calder Foundation for inclusion in their catalogue raisonné, the Foundation contested the work's authenticity. The André Emmerich Gallery refunded Shirley's money, and sued the Segré Foundry, which sought bankruptcy protection. The suit was settled out of court in the late 1990s. Two White Dots now resides outdoors on a farm near a river outside the small town of Washington, Connecticut.

In 2013 the Calder Estate filed a lawsuit against the estate of his former dealer, Klaus Perls, alleging that Perls had sold fake Calders as well as concealing the ownership of 679 works by the artist. After a high-profile battle with much press coverage, the lawsuit was dismissed by Judge Shirley Werner Kornreich in the New York State Supreme Court.

== Personal life ==
Calder and his wife, Louisa, were the parents of two daughters, Sandra (1935–2022) and Mary (1939–2011). Mary's husband, Howard Rower (1939–2000), had been chairman of the board of the Alexander and Louisa Calder Foundation. Mary and Howard's two sons are Alexander S. C. "Sandy" Rower (1963), president of the Calder Foundation, and Holton Rower (1962), a vice president of the Foundation. Alexander Rower established the Foundation in 1987 with the support of the Calder family. He has four children, including Gryphon Rower-Upjohn, a sound experimentalist, composer-performer, and curator in the field of audiovisual culture, who is also known as Gryphon Rue.

Sandra Calder Davidson and her late husband, Jean Davidson, had a son, Shawn (1956), and a daughter, Andréa (1961). Shawn and Andréa are vice presidents of the Calder Foundation. Jean Davidson was the son of artist Jo Davidson. Sandra was an illustrator of children's books. She caricatured her family and friends as animals in the 2013 book The Calder Family and Other Critters: Portraits and Reflections.

The Calder family has a long-standing connection with the Putney School, a progressive co-ed boarding school in Vermont. Calder's daughters attended the school as did several of his grandchildren and great-grandchildren. Around 2007, the Rower family donated a standing mobile (a mobile that stands on its own fixed base) to Putney. A 13-foot mobile hangs in Calder Hall in the Michael S. Currier Center on campus.

== Gallery ==
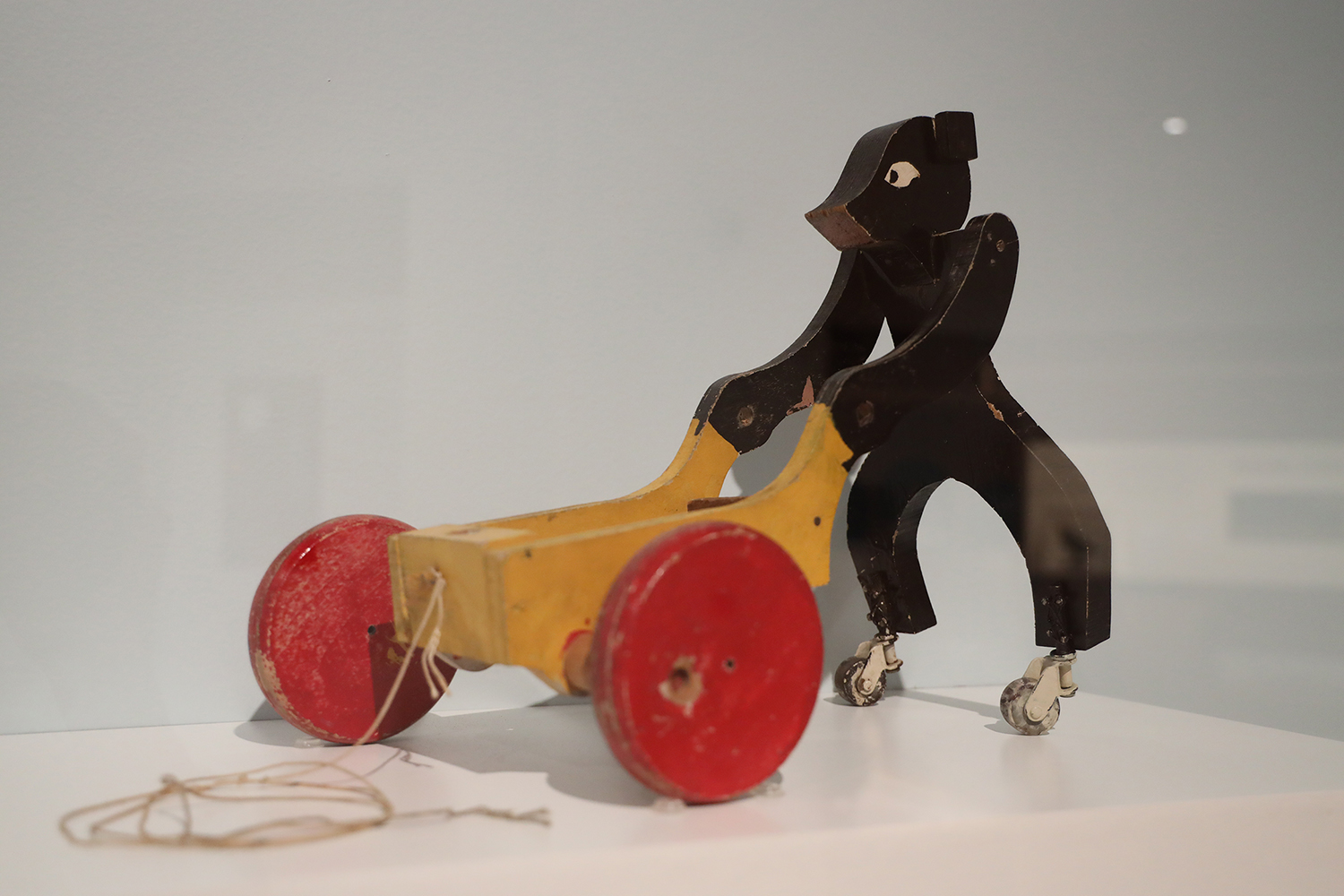
Bear and Cart Toy (1927), Berkshire Museum

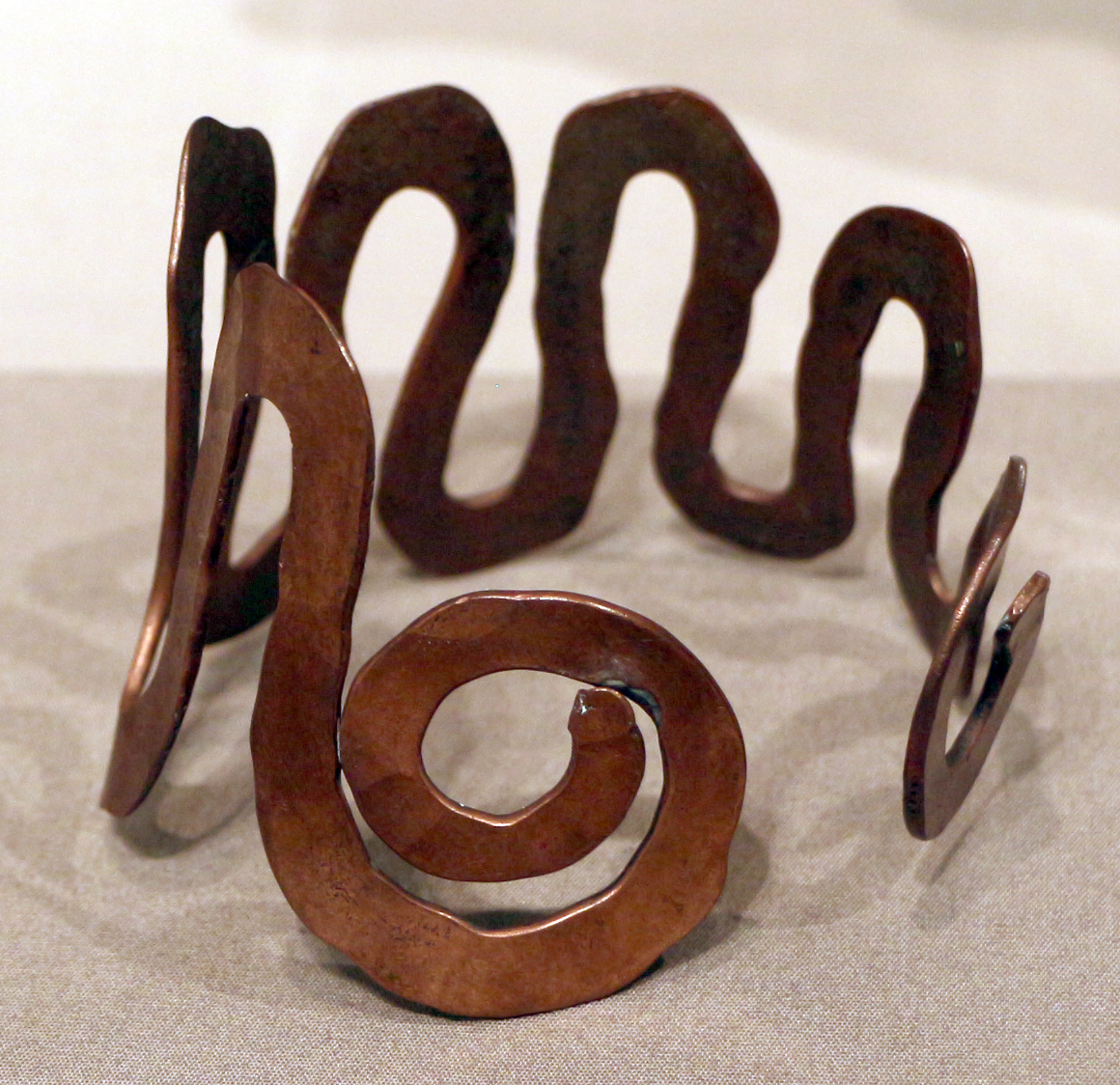
Bracelet in copper (1940), Art Institute of Chicago

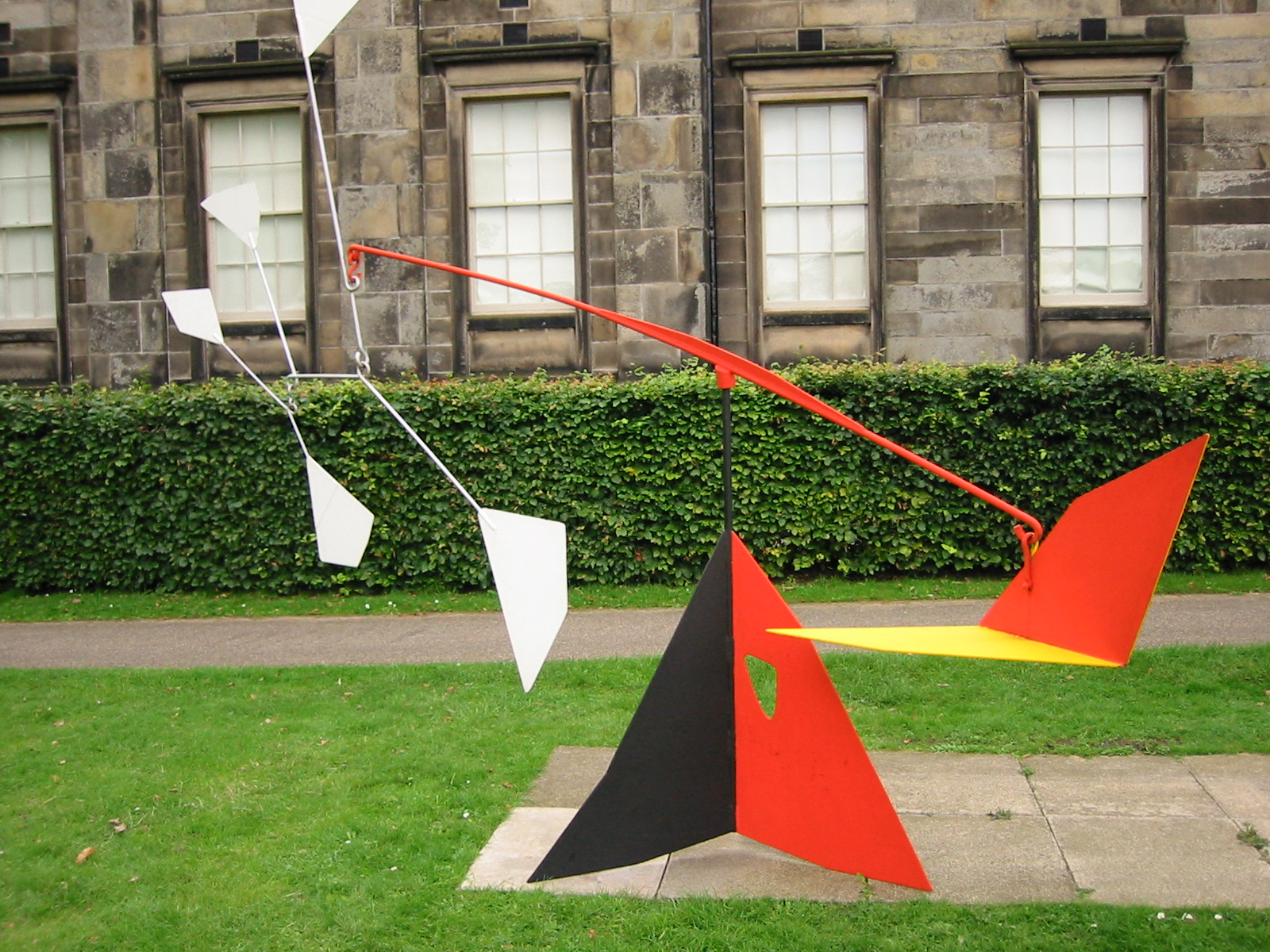
L'empennage (1953), Scottish National Gallery of Modern Art

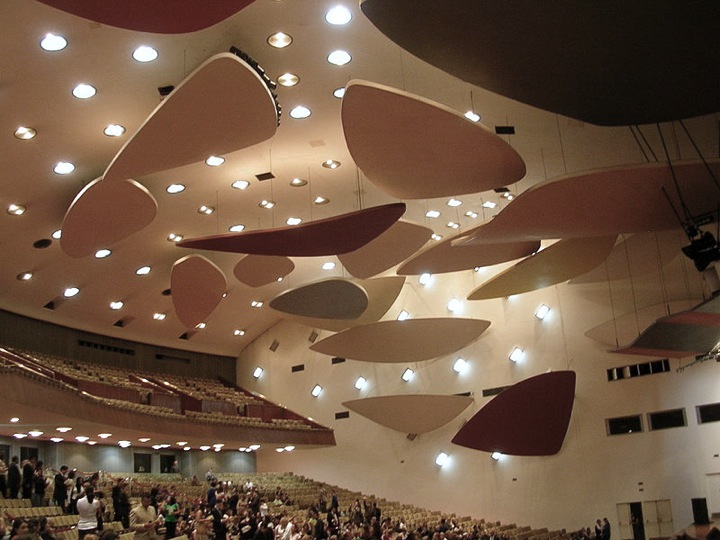
Acoustic Ceiling (1953),
Aula Magna, Universidad Central de Venezuela, Caracas, Venezuela

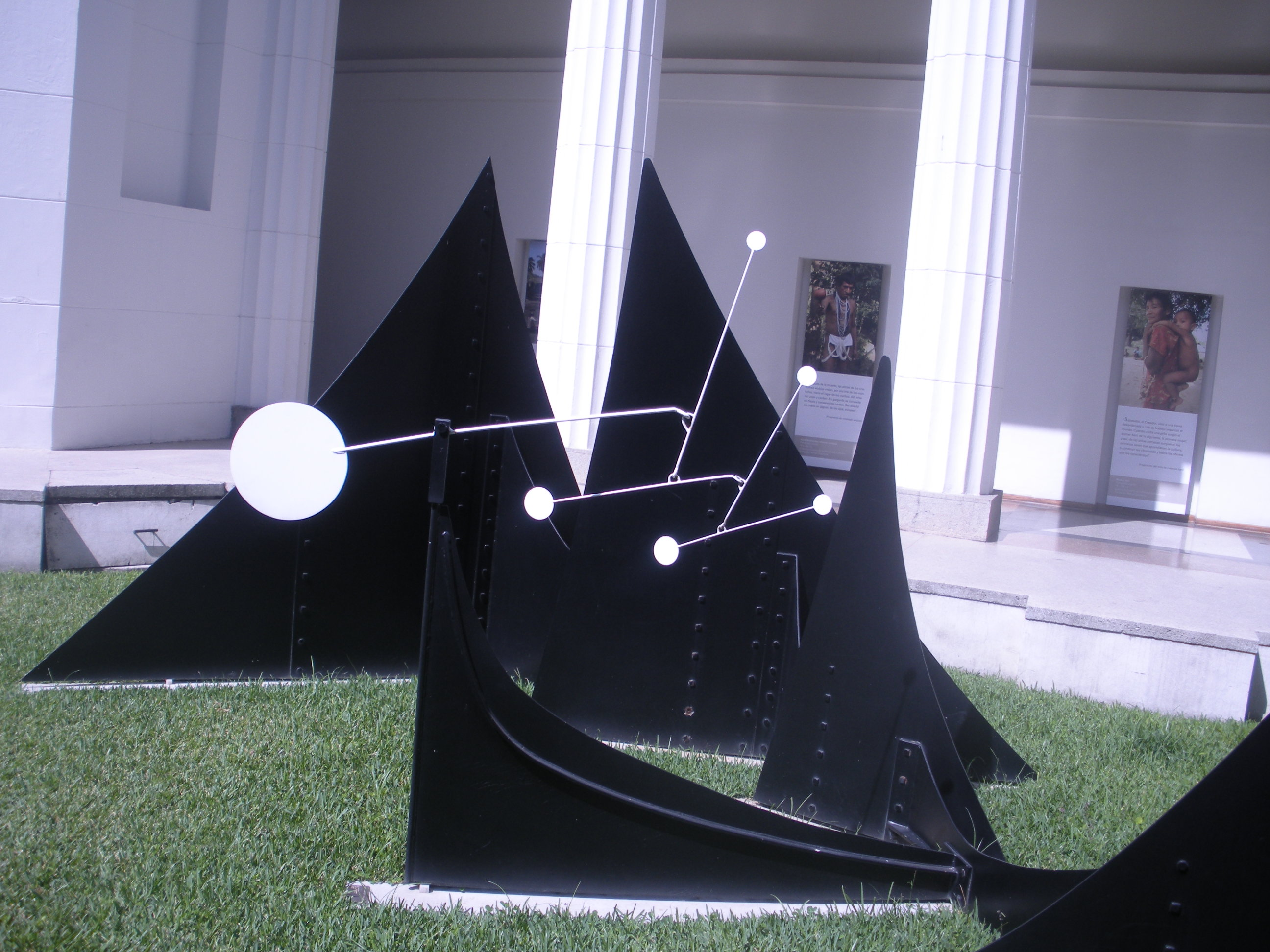
La Ciudad (1960), Galería de Arte Nacional, Caracas - Venezuela

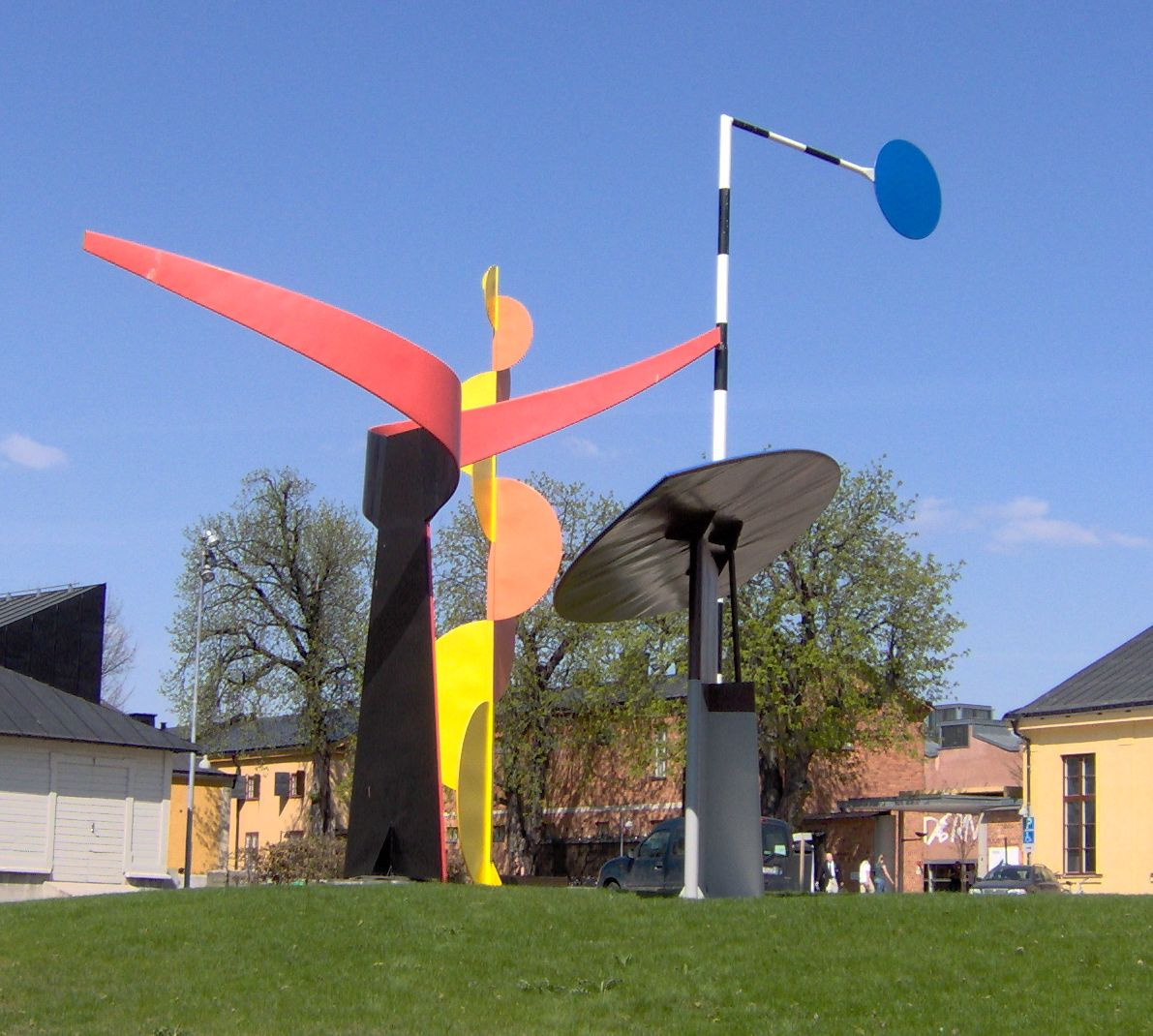
The Four Elements (1961), Moderna Museet, installation at the museum entrance

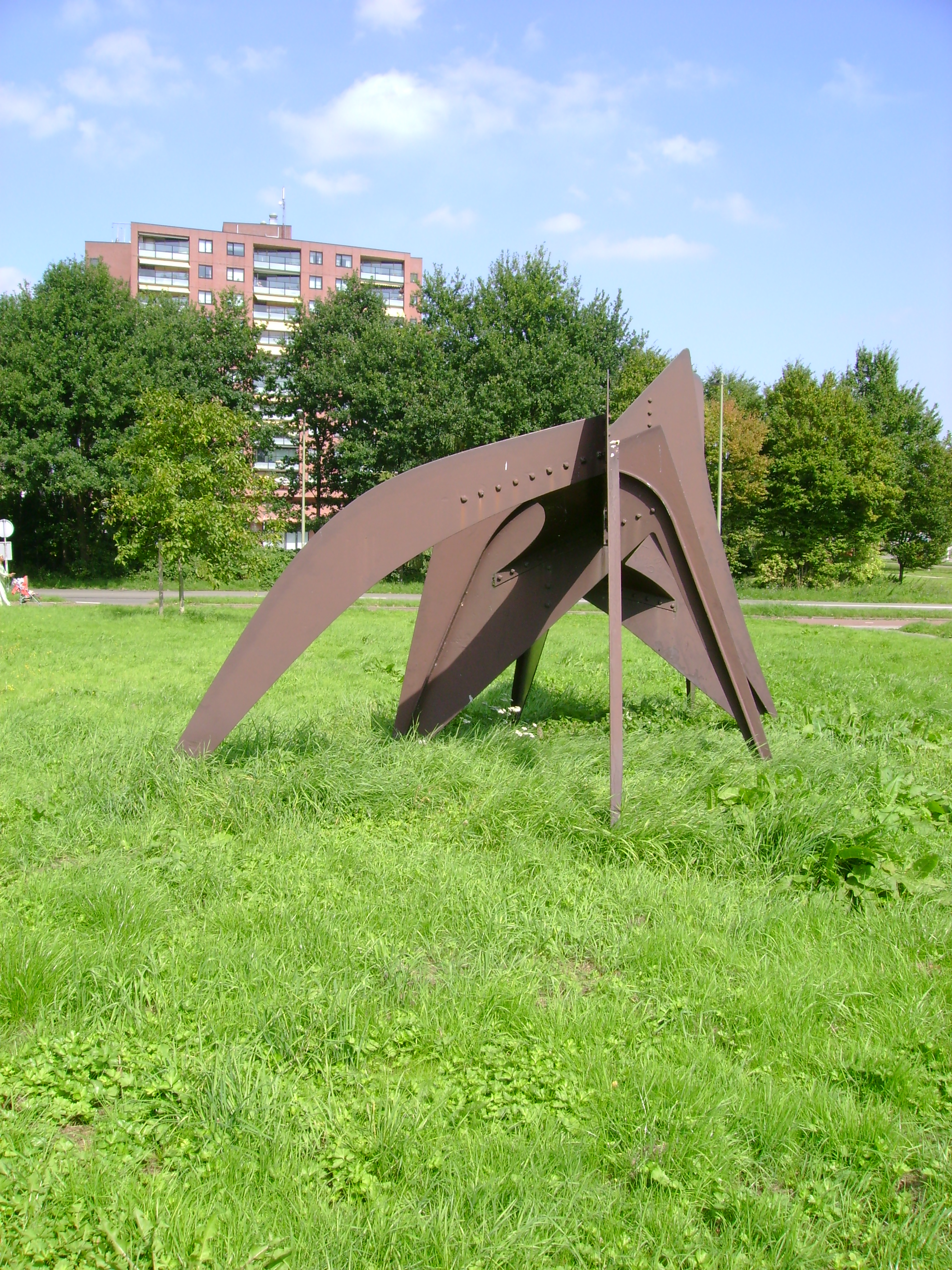
Le tamanoir (The Anteater) (1963),
Rotterdam, Netherlands

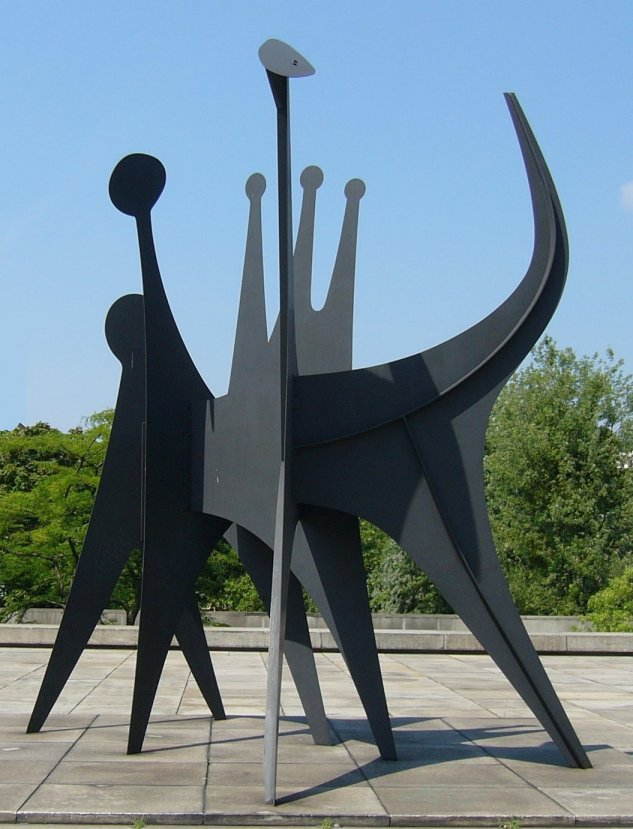
Têtes et queue (Heads and tail) (1965),
Berlin, Germany

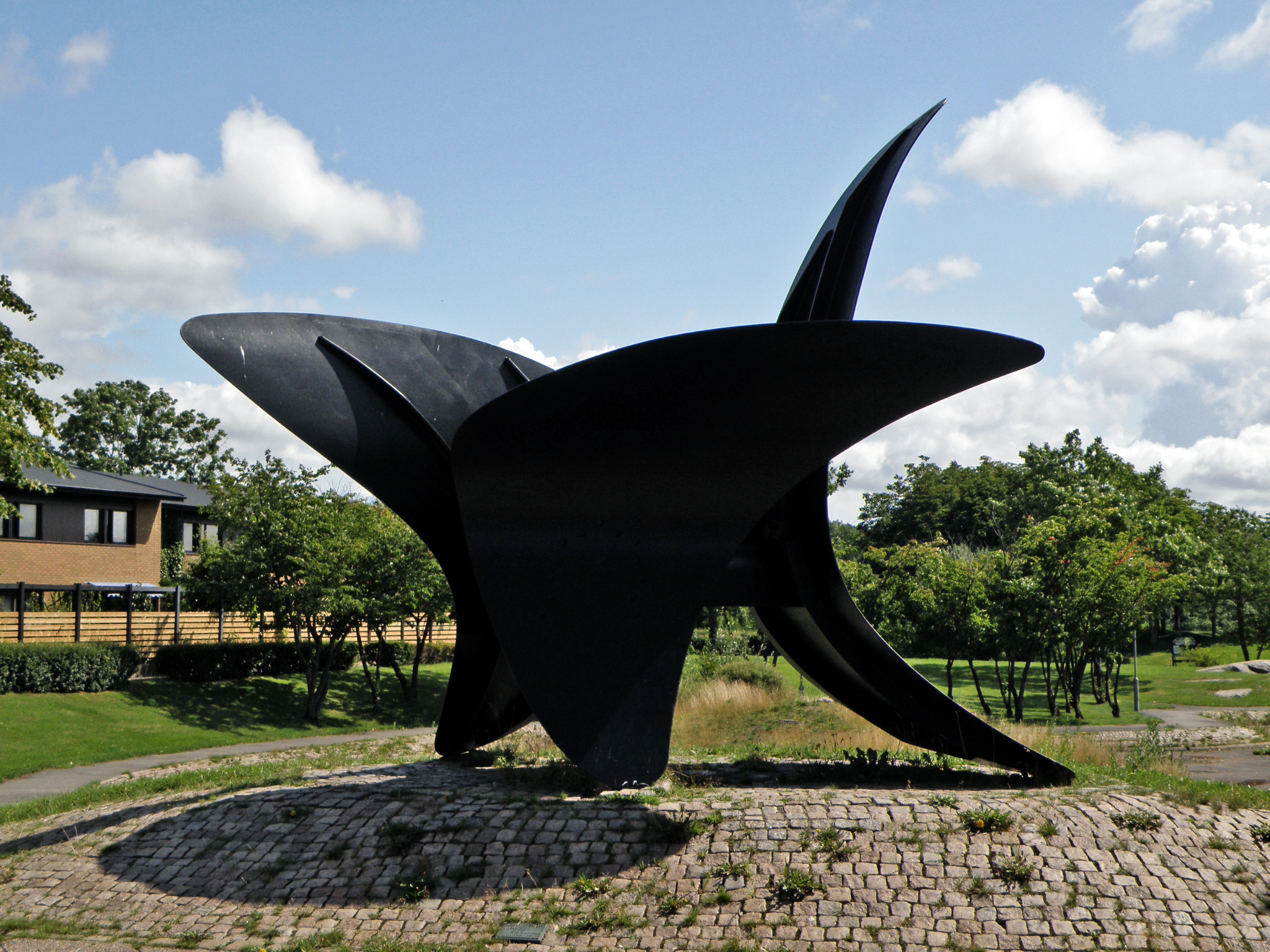
De tre vingarna (The Three Wings) (1967), Blå Stället, Angered, Gothenburg, Sweden.

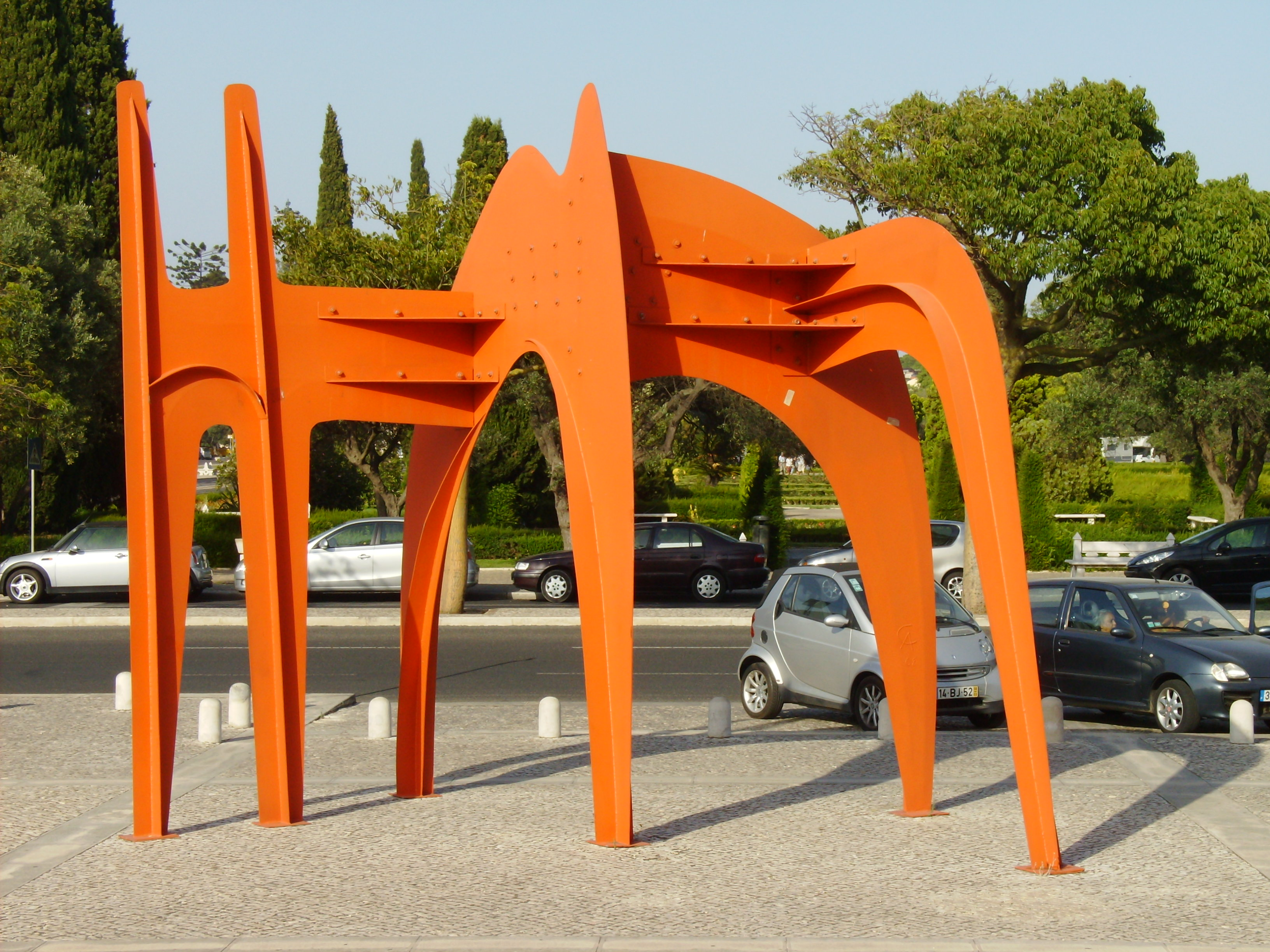
Untitled (1968), Centro Cultural de Belém, Lisbon, Portugal

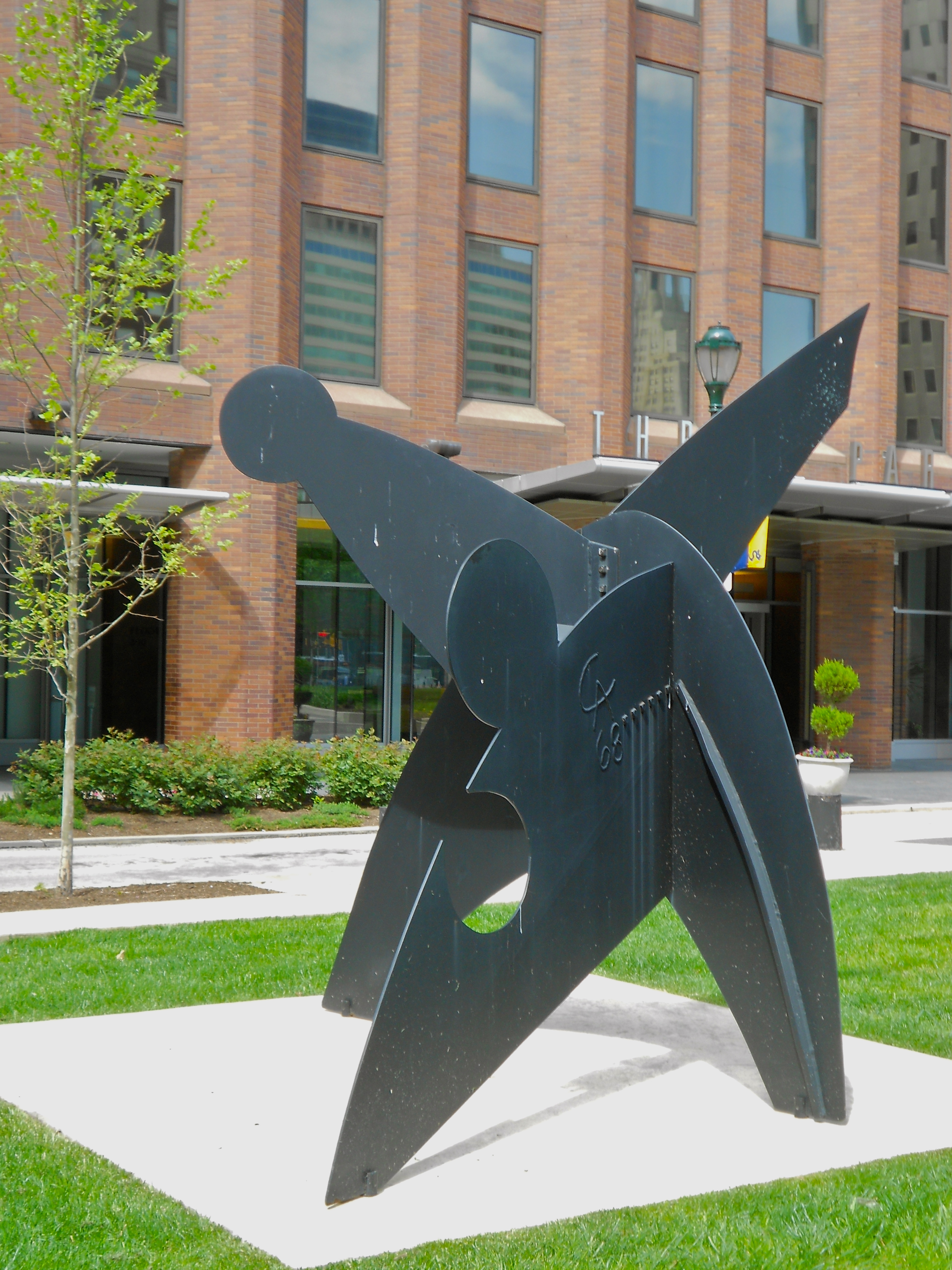
Three Disks, One Lacking (1968), Franklin Parkway, Philadelphia, Pennsylvania

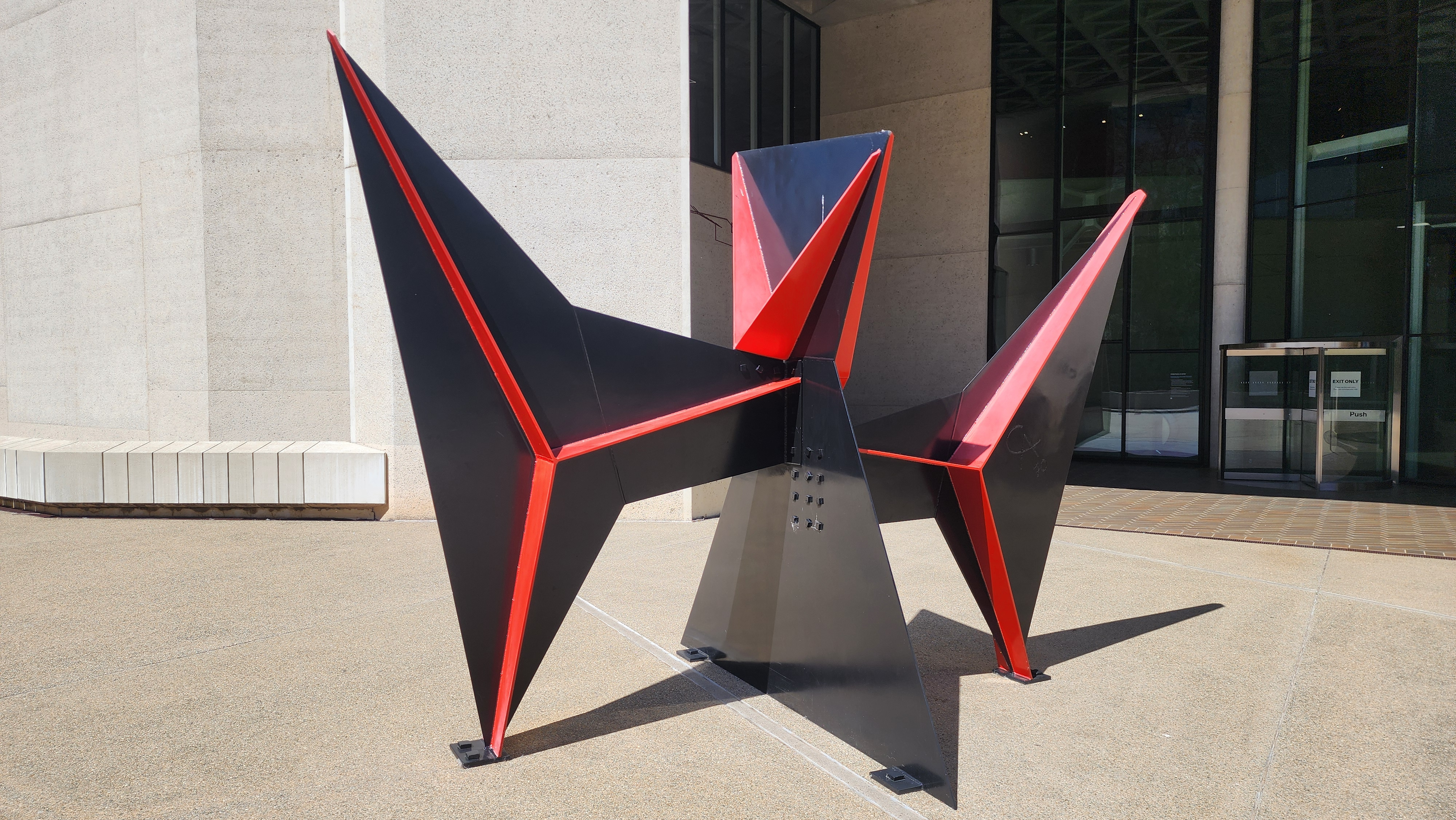
Bobine (Bobbin) (1970), National Gallery of Australia, Canberra, Australia

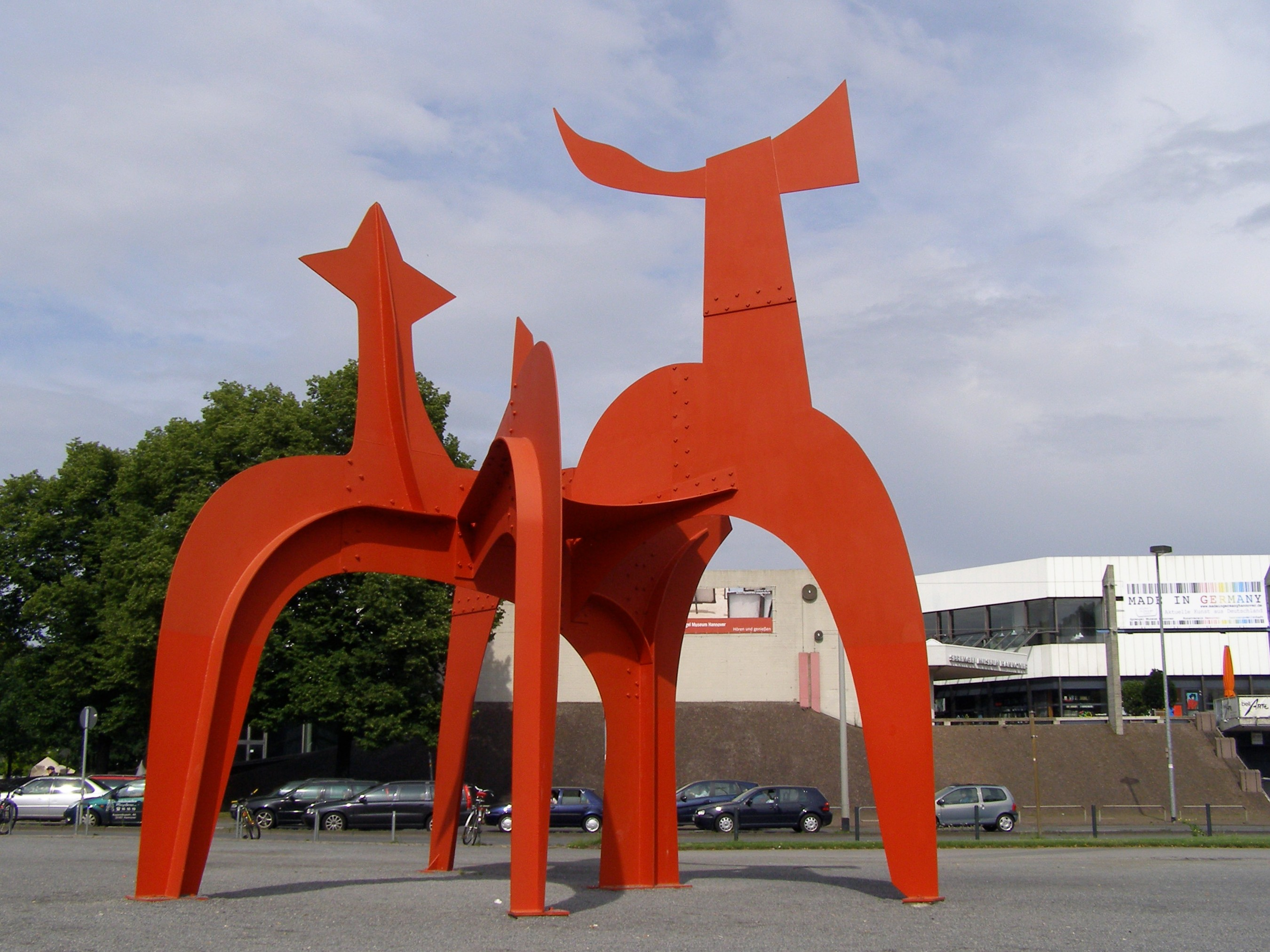
Le hallebardier (The Halberdier) (1971), Sprengel Museum, Hanover, Germany

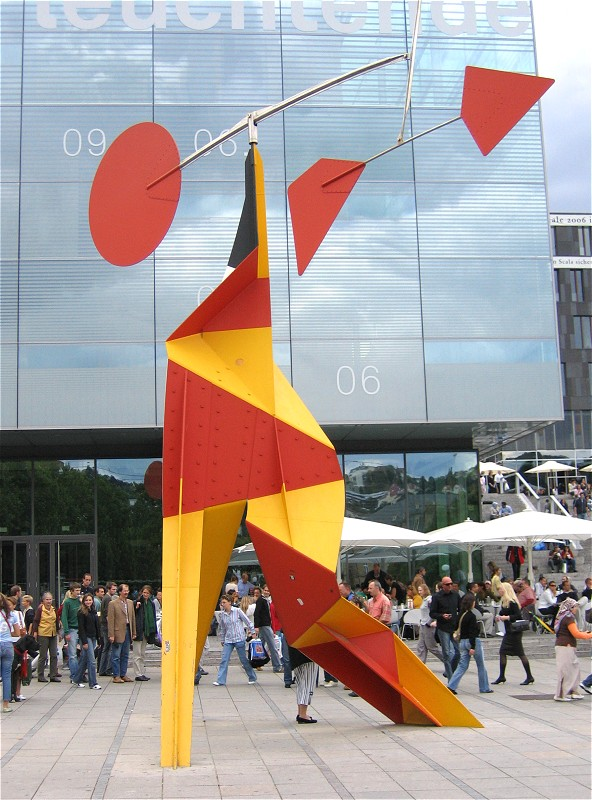
Crinkly avec disque rouge (Crinkly with Red Disk) (1973), Schlossplatz in Stuttgart, Germany

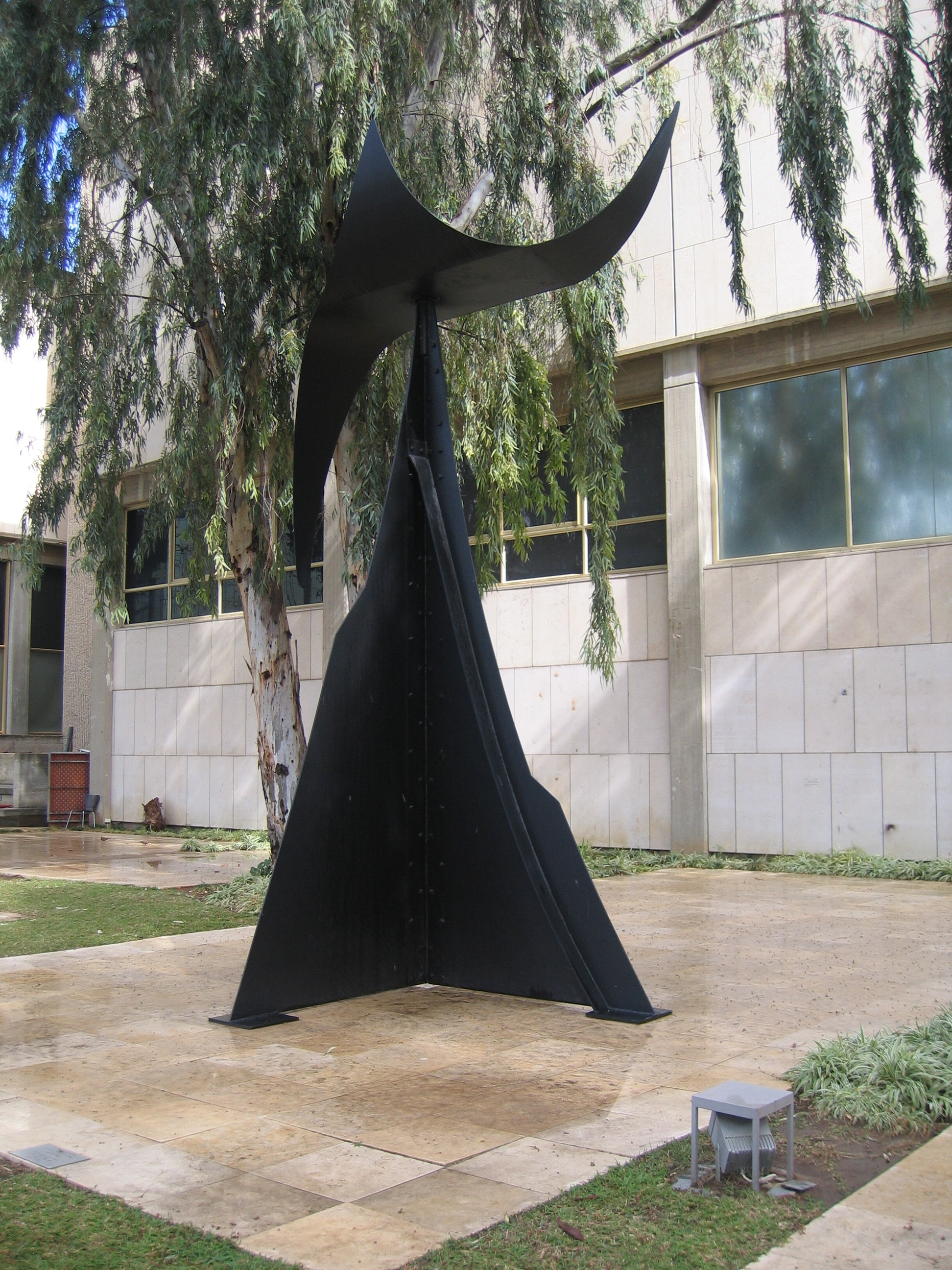
Feuille d'arbre (Tree leaf) (1974),
Tel Aviv, Israel

Flying Dragon (1975), Art Institute of Chicago

== Selected works ==
- Dog (1909), folded brass sheet, made as a present for Calder's parents
- The Flying Trapeze (1925), oil on canvas, 36 x 42 in.
- Elephant (c. 1928), wire and wood, 11½ x 5¾ x 29.2 in.
- Hi! (ca. 1928), brass wire, painted wood base, Honolulu Museum of Art
- Policeman (ca. 1928) wire and wood.
- Aztec Josephine Baker (1930), wire, 53" x 10" x 9". A representation of Josephine Baker, the exuberant lead dancer from La Revue nègre
- Untitled (1931), wire, wood and motor; one of the first kinetic mobiles
- Small Feathers (1931), wire, wood and paint; first true mobile, although designed to stand on a desktop
- Cône d'ébène (1933), ebony, metal bar and wire; early suspended mobile (first was made in 1932)
- Object with Yellow Background (1936), painted wood, metal, string, Honolulu Museum of Art
- Mercury Fountain (1937), sheet metal and liquid mercury metal
- Devil Fish (1937), sheet metal, bolts and paint; first piece made from a model
- 1939 New York World's Fair (maquette) (1938), sheet metal, wire, wood, string and paint
- Necklace (c. 1938), brass wire, glass and mirror
- Sphere Pierced by Cylinders (1939), wire and paint; the first of many floor-standing, lifesize "stabiles" (predating Anthony Caro's "plinthless" sculptures by two decades)
- Lobster Trap and Fish Tail (1939), sheet metal, wire and paint (suspended mobile); design for the stairwell of the Museum of Modern Art, New York
- Black Beast (1940), sheet metal, bolts and paint (freestanding plinthless stabile)
- S-Shaped Vine (1946), sheet metal, wire and paint (suspended mobile)
- Sword Plant (1947) sheet metal, wire and paint (standing mobile)
- Snow Flurry (1948), sheet metal, wire and paint (suspended mobile)
- Stillman House Mural (1952), View of pool at Stillman House
- .125 (1957), steel plate, rods and paint
- Spirale (1958), steel plate, rod and paint, 360" high; public monumental mobile for Maison de l'UNESCO, Paris
- Guillotine pour huit (Guillotine for eight), (1962), at the LaM, Villeneuve d'Ascq, France
- Teodelapio (1962), steel plate and paint, monumental stabile, Spoleto, Italy
- Sky Hooks (1962)
- La Grande voile (1966), a 33-ton metal sculpture composed of five intersecting forms, four planes, and one curve. It stands 40 feet (12 m) tall, on the campus of the Massachusetts Institute of Technology in Cambridge, Massachusetts.
- Trois disques (1967) stainless steel plate, bolts and paint, 65' x 83' x 53', monumental stabile, Montreal Canada
- Gwenfritz (1968) National Museum of American History
- Spinal Column (1968), San Diego Museum of Art
- The Red Sun (El Sol Rojo) (1968), Ruta de la Amistad, Mexico City
- La Grande Vitesse, (1969), steel plate, bolts and paint, 43' x 55' x 25', Grand Rapids, Michigan
- Bent Propeller, [destroyed in the terrorist attacks of September 11, 2001] 1970–71, 7 World Trade Center, New York City
- Peau Rouge Indiana (Red Skin Indiana) (1970), steel plate, bolts and paint, 40' x 32' x 33', Indiana University Bloomington, Bloomington, Indiana
- Young Woman and Her Suitors (1970), painted steel, installed at exterior of AT&T Michigan Headquarters, Detroit, Michigan, displayed at corner of Michigan Avenue (Michigan) and Cass Avenue from 1973 to 2007. Moved for conservation and donated to Detroit Institute of Arts, currently on display at exterior of museum at John R. Street
- Reims, Croix du Sud (Reims, Cross of the South) (1970), at the LaM, Villeneuve d'Ascq, France
- Eagle (1971), steel plate, bolts and paint, 38'9" x 32'8" x 32'8", Olympic Sculpture Park, Seattle, Washington
- White and Red Boomerang (1971), Painted metal, wire, Honolulu Museum of Art
- "Four Arches" (1973), red painted steel plate, 63' tall Los Angeles, California
- Stegosaurus (1973), steel plate, bolts and paint, 50' tall, Wadsworth Atheneum, Hartford, Connecticut
- Cheval Rouge (Red Horse) (1974), red painted sheet metal, at the National Gallery, Washington, D.C.
- Flamingo (1974), red painted steel, at the Federal Plaza, Chicago, Illinois
- Universe (1974), motorized "wallmobile", black, red, yellow, and blue painted steel, Willis Tower, Chicago, Illinois
- Black Flag (1974), black painted steel, Storm King Art Center, New York State
- Tripes (1974), black painted steel, Storm King Art Center
- The Arch (1975), black painted steel, Storm King Art Center
- The Red Feather (1975), black and red painted steel, 11' x 6'3" x 11'2", The Kentucky Center
- Flying Dragon (1975), red painted steel, believed to be the final stabile personally created by Alexander Calder, Art Institute of Chicago, Chicago, Illinois
- Untitled (1976), aluminum honeycomb, tubing and paint, 358½ x 912", National Gallery of Art Washington, D.C.
- L'Araignée Rouge (The Red Spider) (1976), 15m tall, monumental sculpture, Paris La Défense France
- Mountains and Clouds (1976), painted aluminum and steel, 612 inches x 900 inches, Hart Senate Office Building
- Calder's set for Socrate (1976), Pivotal stage sets presented in New York on the first anniversary of Calder's death
- Five Swords (1976), red painted steel, Storm King Art Center

== See also ==
- List of Alexander Calder public artworks
