= List of Herzog & de Meuron works =

Chronological list of completed projects by the Swiss architecture firm Herzog & de Meuron.

Project name	City	Country	Project Start	Realization	Project Number	Other Information	Image
Attic Conversion, Burgstrasse	Riehen	Switzerland	1978	1978	1		
House Conversion, Hardrain	Basel	Switzerland	1979	1979	2		
Gasthof zum Bad	Schönenbuch	Switzerland	1980	1980	9		
Apartment Extension, Lochbruggstrasse	Laufen	Switzerland	1980	1980	8		
Blue House	Oberwil	Switzerland	1979	1980	5		
Apartments Schwarzwaldallee	Basel	Switzerland	1979	1980	4		
Kaserne Gallery Renovation	Basel	Switzerland	1980	1981	11		
Frei Photography Studio	Weil am Rhein	Germany	1981	1982	14		
Apartments Landskronstrasse	Basel	Switzerland	1981	1982	13		
Apartments Ziegelhöfen	Basel	Switzerland	1983	1983	20		
Ricola Office Conversion	Laufen	Switzerland	1983	1983	19		
House for a Veterinarian	Dagmersellen	Switzerland	1983	1984	22		
Plywood House	Bottmingen	Switzerland	1984	1985	27		
Apartments, Birsfelden	Birsfelden	Switzerland	1984	1985	26		
Apartments, St. Gallerring	Basel	Switzerland	1984	1985	24		
Cladding of a house	Fischingen	Germany	1986	1986	36		
House for an Art Collector	Therwil	Switzerland	1985	1986	34		
Sandoz, Building 91	Basel	Switzerland	1985	1986	33		
Historic Building in Laufen	Laufen	Switzerland	1985	1986	32		
Farm Extension and Renovation	Rocourt	Switzerland	1983	1986	21		
Two Houses, Spalenvorstadt	Basel	Switzerland	1986	1987	39		
Ricola Storage Building	Laufen	Switzerland	1986	1987	38		
E, D, E, N, Pavilion	Rheinfelden	Switzerland	1986	1987	35		
Apartments and Offices, Schwitter	Basel	Switzerland	1985	1988	31		
Apartments, Hebelstrasse	Basel	Switzerland	1984	1988	29		
Stone House	Tavole	Italy	1982	1988	17		
Altes Flugfeld	Karlsruhe	Germany	1990	1990	67		
Ricola Factory Addition	Laufen	Switzerland	1989	1991	53		
Antipodes I	Dijon	France	1990	1992	64		
Gallery, Goetz Collection	Munich	Germany	1989	1992	56		
Housing, Pilotengasse	Vienna	Austria	1987	1992	43		
Ricola-Europe	Mulhouse-Brunstatt	France	1992	1993	94		
Pfaffenholz Sports Centre	Saint Louis	France	1989	1993	55		
Apartments and Offices, SUVA	Basel	Switzerland	1988	1993	50		
Sandoz Technology Centre	Basel	Switzerland	1988	1993	46		
Mixed-Use, Schützenmattstrasse	Basel	Switzerland	1984	1993	25		
Vischer House	Basel	Switzerland	1994	1994	114		
Landolt House	Riehen	Switzerland	1994	1994	113		
Koechlin House	Riehen	Switzerland	1993	1994	96		
Signal Box, Auf dem Wolf	Basel	Switzerland	1989	1994	49		
Locomotive Depot, Auf dem Wolf	Basel	Switzerland	1989	1995	48		
Studio Zaugg	Mulhouse	France	1995	1996	133		
Caricature and Cartoon Museum	Basel	Switzerland	1994	1996	131		
Crystal Ring		Switzerland	1997	1997	159		
House in Leymen	Leymen	France	1996	1997	128		
Seminar Building, FH Eberswalde	Eberswalde	Germany	1994	1997	106		
Dominus Winery	Yountville	United States	1995	1998	137		
ISP Rossetti	Basel	Switzerland	1995	1998	132		
Ricola Marketing Building	Laufen	Switzerland	1997	1999	154		
Küppersmühle Museum	Duisburg	Germany	1997	1999	151		
Satellite Signal Box	Basel	Switzerland	1995	1999	140		
Central Signal Box	Basel	Switzerland	1994	1999	119		
Library, FH Eberswalde	Eberswalde	Germany	1994	1999	105		
Rue des Suisses	Paris	France	1996	2000	149		
Mixed-use, Herrnstrasse	Munich	Germany	1996	2000	142		
Tate Modern	Greater London	United Kingdom	1994	2000	126		
Mixed-Use, Dornacherplatz	Solothurn	Switzerland	1993	2000	102		
Roche Buildings 92 and 41	Basel	Switzerland	1993	2000	100		
Photo Collection, Oslostrasse	Münchenstein	Switzerland	2001	2001	192		
Concert Hall	Basel	Switzerland	2000	2001	188		
Offices, St. Johanns-Vorstadt	Basel	Switzerland	2001	2002	193		
Prada New York	New York	United States	2000	2002	185		
Réfectoire J.-P. Moueix	Pomerol	France	2001	2002	176		
Studios for Two Artists	Düsseldorf	Germany	1998	2002	172		
Offices, Helvetia Patria	St. Gallen	Switzerland	1998	2002	168		
REHAB	Basel	Switzerland	1998	2002	165		
Ameropa	Binningen	Switzerland	2000	2003	181		
Prada Tokyo	Tokyo	Japan	2000	2003	178		
Schaulager®	Münchenstein	Switzerland	1998	2003	169		
Laban	London	United Kingdom	1997	2003	160		
Kunsthaus Aarau	Aarau	Switzerland	1996	2003	153		
Fünf Höfe	Munich	Germany	1995	2003	143		
Sweet Dreams	Basel	Switzerland	2004	2004	256		
Notting Hill Gate	London	United Kingdom	2002	2004	220		
Forum 2004	Barcelona	Spain	2000	2004	190		
Helvetia Patria, North Wing	St. Gallen	Switzerland	1989	2004	174		
Library, TU Cottbus	Cottbus	Germany	1998	2004	166		
Jinhua Pavilions	Jinhua	China	2004	2005	261		
Allianz Arena	Munich	Germany	2005	2005	205		
Elsässertor	Basel	Switzerland	2000	2005	180		
Walker Art Center	Minneapolis	United States	1999	2005	175		
de Young Museum	San Francisco	United States	1999	2005	173		
Tate Modern	London	United Kingdom	2001	2005	191		
Temporary Prada Store	Basel	Switzerland	2005	2006	288		
Tristan und Isolde	Berlin	Germany	2005	2006	274		
Dart Cottage	Bickleigh, Devon	United Kingdom	2003	2006	248		
Roche Bau 95	Basel	Switzerland	2003	2006	225		
Bond Street	New York	United States	2004	2007	253		
Hotel Astoria	Luzern	Switzerland	2002	2007	207		
St. Johanns-Rheinweg	Basel	Switzerland	2001	2007	195		
St. Jakob Park	Basel	Switzerland	1996	2007	148		
Puerto Tenerife	Santa Cruz de Tenerife, Canary Islands	Spain	1998	2007	163		
St. Jakob Turm	Basel	Switzerland	2003	2008	245		
National Stadium	Beijing	China	2002	2008	226		
CaixaForum	Madrid	Spain	2001	2008	201		
Plaza de España	Santa Cruz de Tenerife	Spain	1998	2008	182		
TEA	Santa Cruz de Tenerife, Canary Islands	Spain	1999	2008	164		
VitraHaus	Weil am Rhein	Germany	2006	2009	294		
Attila	New York	United States	2008	2010	320		
Actelion	Allschwil	Switzerland	2005	2010	284		
1111 Lincoln Road	Miami Beach	United States	2005	2010	279		
Museum der Kulturen	Basel	Switzerland	2001	2010	200		
Atelier Ruff	Düsseldorf	Germany	2008	2011	340		
Roche Bau 97 TR&D	Basel	Switzerland	2005	2011	289		
Serpentine Pavilion	London	United Kingdom	2012	2012	400		
Schaulager Satellite	Basel	Switzerland	2012	2012	394		
Volkshaus	Basel	Switzerland	2011	2012	379		
Parrish	Southampton	United States	2009	2012	349		
Burgos Bulevar	Burgos	Spain	2005	2012	295		
Museu Barcelona	Barcelona	Spain	2009	2012	190.2		
Actelion 2	Allschwil	Switzerland	2007	2013	318		
Pérez Art Museum Miami	Miami	United States	2006	2013	306		
Messe Basel	Basel	Switzerland	2002	2013	213		
Ricola	Laufen	Switzerland	2010	2014	369		
Natal Gymnasium	Natal	Brazil	2011	2014	354.1		
Bädli	Riehen	Switzerland	2007	2014	319		
Dreispitz	Münchenstein	Switzerland	2007	2014	312		
Expo Milan 2015 Pavilion	Milan	Italy	2014	2015	446		
Miu Miu	Tokyo	Japan	2012	2015	412		
Uster	Uster	Switzerland	2011	2015	389		
School of Government	Oxford	United Kingdom	2011	2015	387		
Gondelbahn Espel-Stöffeli-Chäserrugg	Wildhaus-Alt St. Johann	Switzerland	2014	2015	374.2		
Bergstation Chäserrugg	Unterwasser	Switzerland	2010	2015	374		
Stade Bordeaux	Bordeaux	France	2010	2015	367		
Novartis	Basel	Switzerland	2009	2015	362		
Unterlinden	Colmar	France	2009	2015	356		
Roche Bau 1	Basel	Switzerland	2008	2015	345		
Kramlich Residence	Oakville, Napa Valley	United States	1997	2015	158		
BBVA	Madrid	Spain	2007	2015	324		
VDM Depot	Weil am Rhein	Germany	2012	2016	417		
Shantou Medical College	Shantou	China	2009	2016	353		
Beirut	Beirut	Lebanon	2009	2016	347		
Feltrinelli	Milan	Italy	2008	2016	327		
Tate Modern 2	London	United Kingdom	2004	2016	263		
Elbphilharmonie	Hamburg	Germany	2003	2016	230		
Roche Bau 10	Basel	Switzerland	2013	2017	431		
îlot A3	Lyon	France	2013	2017	423		
Helvetia Erweiterung West	St. Gallen	Switzerland	2012	2017	414		
Chrystie Street Hotel	New York	United States	2012	2017	409		
Espel Pavillon	Wildhaus-Alt St. Johann	Switzerland	2017	2017	374.3		
Castagnola 1747	Lugano	Switzerland	2009	2017	350		
Leonard Street	New York	United States	2006	2017	305		
1111 Extension	Miami Beach	United States	2014	2018	437		
Leroy Street	New York	United States	2013	2018	420		
Südpark Baufeld B	Basel	Switzerland	2013	2018	418		
Jade 4	Sunny Isles Beach	United States	2012	2018	396		
Central Police Station	Hong Kong	China	2006	2018	296		
SK Tech, East Ring	Moscow	Russian Federation	2012	2019	408.1		
CC DC	Washington, D.C.	United States	2012	2019	392		
UNIQLO TOKYO	Tokyo	Japan	2019	2020	517		
Stadt-Casino	Basel	Switzerland	2012	2020	402		
Volkshaus Hotel	Basel	Switzerland	2014	2020	379.1		
SongEun	Seoul	South Korea	2016	2021	473		
RCA	London	United Kingdom	2016	2021	472		
Roche Bau 8 und 11	Basel	Switzerland	2015	2021	456		
Erweiterung MKM Museum Küppersmühle	Duisburg	Germany	2013	2021	433		
AstraZeneca	Cambridge	United Kingdom	2013	2021	430		
M+	Hong Kong	Hong Kong Special Administrative Region of the People's Republic of China	2012	2021	415		
Powerhouse Arts	Brooklyn	United States	2016	2022	461		
Roche Bau 2	Basel	Switzerland	2015	2022	445		
One Park Drive	London	United Kingdom	2012	2022	404		
UniFor	Milan	Italy	2021	2022	327.2		
St. Alban-Vorstadt 12	Basel	Switzerland	2018	2023	495		
Blevio Spa & Pool	Como	Italy	2021	2023	492.1		
SIP Main Campus	Allschwil	Switzerland	2016	2023	462		
National Library	Jerusalem	Israel	2013	2023	426		
Kornmarkt	Bregenz	Austria	2018	2024	488		
Roche pRED - Center	Basel	Switzerland	2013	2024	425		
Helvetia Campus Basel	Basel	Switzerland	2013	2024	419		
Kinderspital	Zurich	Switzerland	2011	2024	377		
Am Tacheles	Berlin	Germany	2014	2024	439		
