= List of United States federal courthouses in Illinois =

Following is a list of current and former courthouses of the United States federal court system located in Illinois. Each entry indicates the name of the building along with an image, if available, its location and the jurisdiction it covers, the dates during which it was used for each such jurisdiction, and, if applicable the person for whom it was named, and the date of renaming. Dates of use will not necessarily correspond with the dates of construction or demolition of a building, as pre-existing structures may be adapted or court use, and former court buildings may later be put to other uses. Also, the official name of the building may be changed at some point after its use as a federal court building has been initiated.

== Courthouses ==
Courthouse	City	Image	Street address	Jurisdiction	Dates of use	Named for
William L. Beatty Federal Building & U.S. Courthouse	Alton		501 Belle Street	S.D. Ill.	?	William L. Beatty (2002)
Federal Building and U.S. Courthouse	Benton		301 West Main Street	E.D. Ill. S.D. Ill.	1959–1978; 1978–present	n/a
U.S. Custom House & Post Office†	Cairo		1400 Washington Avenue	S.D. Ill. E.D. Ill.	1872–1905; 1905–1942; Now the Cairo Custom House Museum.	n/a
U.S. Post Office & Courthouse	Cairo		1500 Washington Avenue	E.D. Ill. S.D. Ill.	1942–1978; 1978–? Still in use as a post office	n/a
U.S. Custom House, Court House, & Post Office	Chicago		?	N.D. Ill. 7th Cir.	1879–1894; 1891–1894; Razed in 1896; replaced by Chicago Federal Building at same site.	n/a
U.S. Appellate Court Bldg	Chicago		1212 N. Lake Shore Drive	7th Cir.	1938–1965; Fate of building unknown.	n/a
Chicago Federal Building	Chicago		218 S. Dearborn Street	N.D. Ill.	1905–1965; Structure replaced by the Kluczynski Federal Building; court relocated.	n/a
Everett McKinley Dirksen U.S. Courthouse	Chicago		219 South Dearborn Street	N.D. Ill. 7th Cir.	1964–present	U.S. Senator Everett Dirksen
U.S. Post Office & Courthouse	Danville		?	S.D. Ill. E.D. Ill.	1894–1905; 1905–1911; Razed in 1911 or 1912.	n/a
U.S. Post Office & Courthouse†	Danville		201 North Vermilion Street	E.D. Ill.	1911–1978; Now in use by the U.S. Bankruptcy Court, C.D. Ill.	n/a
Melvin Price Federal Bldg & U.S. Courthouse†	East Saint Louis		750 Missouri Avenue	E.D. Ill. S.D. Ill.	1910–1978; 1978–present	U.S. Rep. Charles Melvin Price (1990)
U.S. Post Office	Freeport		103 North Chicago Avenue	N.D. Ill.	1905–1977; Still in use as a post office.	n/a
U.S. Post Office & Court House	Peoria		?	N.D. Ill. S.D. Ill.	1889–1905; 1905–1937; Razed in 1937.	n/a
Central District of Illinois Courthouse†	Peoria		100 N.E. Monroe	E.D. Ill. C.D. Ill.	1938–1978; 1978-present	n/a
U.S. Post Office & Court House^{†}	Quincy		?	S.D. Ill. C.D. Ill.	1887–1978; 1978–? Still in use as a post office.	n/a
U.S. Post Office & Court House	Rock Island		211 19th Street	S.D. Ill. C.D. Ill.	1957–1978; 1978–present	n/a
Winnebago County Juvenile Justice Center	Rockford		211 South Court Street	N.D. Ill.	?–2011	n/a
Stanley J. Roszkowski U.S. Courthouse	Rockford		327 South Church Street	N.D. Ill.	2011–present	District Court judge Stanley Julian Roszkowski
U.S. Court House & Post Office	Springfield		?	S.D. Ill.	1869–1929; Razed in 1929.	n/a
Paul Findley Federal Bldg & U.S. Courthouse	Springfield		600 East Monroe Street	S.D. Ill. C.D. Ill.	1930–1978; 1978-present	U.S. Rep. Paul Findley
U.S. Courthouse	Urbana		201 South Vine Street	C.D. Ill.	1994–present	n/a

== Key ==
^{†}	Listed on the National Register of Historic Places (NRHP)
^{††}	NRHP-listed and also designated as a National Historic Landmark
