= List of United States post offices in Illinois =

United States post offices operate under the authority of the United States Post Office Department (1792–1971) or the United States Postal Service (since 1971). Historically, post offices were usually placed in a prominent location. Many were architecturally distinctive, including notable buildings featuring Beaux-Arts, Art Deco, and Vernacular architecture. However, modern U.S. post offices were generally designed for functionality rather than architectural style.

Following is a list of United States post offices in Illinois. Notable post offices include individual buildings, whether still in service or not, which have architectural, historical, or community-related significance. Many of these are listed on the National Register of Historic Places (NRHP) or state and local historic registers.

Post office	City	Date built	Image	Architect	Notes	Ref.
United States Post Office-Abingdon	Abingdon	1939–1940		Louis A. Simon, Neal A. Melick	(Note: Houses a New Deal artwork, the terra-cotta relief sculpture Post Rider by H. Arnold Newell.)	
United States Post Office-Albion	Albion	1939–1940				
United States Post Office-Anna	Anna	1937				
United States Post Office (Belvidere, Illinois)	Belvidere	1911		James Knox Taylor	(Note: Listed in the National Register of Historic Places)	
United States Post Office-Berwyn	Berwyn	1940–1941		Louis A. Simon, Neal A. Melick	(Note: Houses the New Deal mural The Picnic by Richard Haines.)	
United States Post Office-Bradley	Bradley	1937–1938				
United States Post Office (Carmi, Illinois)	Carmi	1938		Louis A. Simon, Neal A. Melick		
United States Post Office (Carthage, Illinois)	Carthage	1934		Louis A. Simon, George O. Von Nerta	(Note: Houses the New Deal mural Pioneers – Tilling the Soil and Building Log Cabin by Karl Kelpe.)	
United States Post Office (Carlyle, Illinois)	Carlyle	1941			(Note: Houses the New Deal artworks Dairy Farming, Farm, and Fish Hatchery, three bas-relief sculptures by Curt Drewes.)	
United States Post Office (Champaign, Illinois)	Champaign	1905		James Knox Taylor		
United States Post Office (Chester, Illinois)	Chester	1938		Louis A. Simon, Neal A. Melick, Harry B. Carter	(Note: Houses the New Deal mural Loading the Packet by Fay E. Davis.)	
Englewood Station Post Office (Chicago Illinois)	Chicago	1938		Louis A. Simon, Neal A. Melick, Howard Lovewell Cheney		
Kedzie-Grace Post Office (Chicago, Illinois)	Chicago	1936		Louis A. Simon, Neal A. Melick	(Note: Houses the New Deal aluminum bas relief Mercury by Peter Paul Ott.)	
Lakeview Station Post Office (Chicago Illinois)	Chicago	1937		Louis A. Simon	(Note: Houses the New Deal mural Chicago: Epoch of a Great City by Harry Sternberg.)	
Lincoln Park Station Post Office (Chicago Illinois)	Chicago	1935		Louis A. Simon		
Logan Square Station Post Office (Chicago Illinois)	Chicago	1933		John C. Bollenbacher, Louis A. Simon, Neal A. Melick	(Note: Houses the New Deal sculpture The Post by Hildreth Meiere.)	
Morgan Park Post Office (Chicago Illinois)	Chicago	1936		Louis A. Simon, Neal A. Melick, Howard Lovewell Cheney		
United States Custom House, Court House, and Post Office	Chicago	1878		Alfred B. Mullett	(Note: Demolished in 1896.)	
Old Chicago Main Post Office	Chicago	1921		Graham, Anderson, Probst & White	(Note: No longer used as a post office.)	
Roseland Station Post Office (Chicago, Illinois)	Chicago					
Stockyard Station Post Office	Chicago	1939		Louis A. Simon		
Uptown Post Office – Chicago	Chicago	1939		Louis A. Simon, Neal A. Melick, Howard Lovewell Cheney	(Note: Houses the New Deal murals Carl Sandburg and Louis Sullivan fabricated in glazed ceramic tiles by Henry Varnum Poor.)	
United States Post Office (Chillicothe, Illinois)	Chillicothe	1940		Louis A. Simon, Neal A. Melick	(Note: Houses the New Deal mural Rail Roading by Arthur H. Lidov.)	
United States Post Office (Clinton, Illinois)	Clinton	1937		Louis A. Simon, Neal A. Melick	(Note: Houss the New Deal mural Clinton in Winter by Aaron Bohrod.)	
United States Post Office and Court House (Danville, Illinois)	Danville	1911		James Knox Taylor		
United States Post Office (Decatur, Illinois)	Decatur	1934		Louis A. Simon, George O. Von Nerta, Brooks-Bramhall & Dague	(Note: Houses the New Deal murals by three artists, including Early Pioneers, Social Consciousness, and Growth of Democracy in Illinois by Edward Millman; the triptych The Fusion of Agriculture and Industry by Mitchell Siporin; and the diptychs Frank Lloyd Wright and Carl Sandburg, John Deere and Francis Parker, and Development of Illinois by Edgar Britton.)	
United States Post Office (Des Plaines Illinois)	Des Plaines	1940–1941		Louis A. Simon, Neal A. Melick	(Note: Houses the New Deal mural The Death of Pere Marquette by James Michael Newell.)	
United States Post Office (Downers Grove, Illinois)	Downers Grove	1938		Louis A. Simon, Neal A. Melick, Harry B. Carter	(Note: Houses the New Deal mural Chicago, Railroad Center of the Nation by Elizabeth Tracy.)	
United States Post Office (Dwight, Illinois)	Dwight	1936		Louis A. Simon, Neal A. Melick	(Note: Houses the New Deal mural The Stage at Dawn by Carlos Lopez.)	
United States Post Office (East Alton, Illinois)	East Alton	1934		Louis A. Simon, George O. Von Nerta	(Note: Houses the New Deal mural The Letter by Frances Foy.)	
United States Post Office and Courthouse, now Melvin Price Federal Building and United States Courthouse	East St. Louis	1908–1909		James Knox Taylor		
United States Post Office (Eldorado, Illinois)	Eldorado	1935			(Note: Houses the New Deal mural Mining in Illinois by William Schwartz.)	
United States Post Office (Elmhurst, Illinois)	Elmhurst	1935		Lorimer Rich, Louis A. Simon, Neal A. Melick, Childs and Smith	(Note: Houess the New Deal mural There Was Vision by George Melville Smith.)	
United States Post Office (Evanston, Illinois)	Evanston	1938			(Note: Houses the New Deal sculptures Mail Handler and Throwing the Mail by Robert I. Russin, and The Message and The Answer by Armin A. Scheler.)	
United States Post Office (Fairfield, Illinois)	Fairfield	1934		Louis A. Simon, George O. Von Nerta	(Note: Housed the New Deal mural Old Settlers by William Schwartz.)	
United States Post Office (Flora, Illinois)	Flora	1936		Lorimer Rich, Louis A. Simon, Neal A. Melick		
United States Post Office (Forest Park, Illinois)	Forest Park	1937		Louis A. Simon, Neal A. Melick		
United States Post Office and Customhouse (Galena, Illinois)	Galena	1858		unknoqn	(Note: Believed to be the oldest continually operating post office in the United States.)	
United States Post Office (Galesburg, Illinois)	Galesburg	1936–1937		Louis A. Simon, Neal A. Melick, Aldrich and Aldrich Architects,	(Note: Houses the New Deal mural Breaking the Prairie–Log City, 1837 by Aaron Bohrod.)	
United States Post Office (Geneva, Illinois)	Geneva	1938		Lorimer Rich, Louis A. Simon, Neal A. Melick	(Note: Contributing structure to the Central Geneva Historic District.) (Note: Houes a New Deal mural by Manuel Bromberg.)	
United States Post Office (Gibson City, Illinois)	Gibson City	1938		Louis A. Simon, Neal A. Melick		
United States Post Office (Gillespie, Illinois)	Gillespie	1935			(Note: Houses the New Deal mural Illinois Farm by Gustaf Dahlstrom.)	
United States Post Office (Herrin, Illinois)	Herrin	1935			(Note: Houses the New Deal mural George Rogers Clark Confers with the Indians Near Herrin, Illinois by Gustaf Dalstrom.)	
United States Post Office (Joliet, Illinois)	Joliet	1903		James Knox Taylor		
United States Post Office (Kankakee, Illinois)	Kankakee	1939		Louis A. Simon, Neal A. Melick	(Note: Houses three New Deal wooden reliefs by Edouard Chassaing.)	
United States Post Office (Lemont, Illinois)	Lemont	1937			(Note: Houses the New Deal mural Canal Boats by Charles Turzak.)	
United States Post Office (Lewistown, Illinois)	Lewistown	1939–1940			(Note: Houses the New Age mural Lewistown Milestones by Ida Abelman.)	
United States Post Office (Madison, Illinois)	Madison	1937			(Note: Houses the New Deal mural Assimilation of the Immigrant into the Industrial Life of Madison by A. Raymond Katz.)	
United States Post Office (Mattoon, Illinois)	Mattoon	1913		James Knox Taylor		
United States Post Office (Moline, Illinois)	Moline	1934		William H. Schulzke, Louis A. Simon, Neal A. Melick	(Note: Houses the New Deal mural Ploughshare Manufacturing by Edward Millman.)	
United States Post Office (Monticello, Illinois)	Monticello	1934		Louis A. Simon, George O. Von Nerta		
United States Post Office (Morrison, Illinois)	Morrison	1934		Louis A. Simon, George O. Von Nerta		
United States Post Office-Morton, now Morton Municipal Building and Village Hall	Morton	1937		Louis A. Simon, Neal A. Melick	(Note: Originally housed the New Deal bas relief Spirit of Communication by Charles Umlauf, which was relocated to a new post office building in 1976.)	
United States Post Office (Mount Carroll, Illinois)	Mount Carroll	1940			(Note: Houses the New Deal mural Rural Scenes—Wakurusa Valley by Irene Bianucci.)	
United States Post Office (Mount Morris, Illinois)	Mount Morris	1936–1937			(Note: Houses the New Deal mural The Growth of Mount Morris by Dale Nichols.)	
Mount Pulaski Courthouse	Mount Pulaski	1847		unknown		
United States Post Office (Mount Sterling, Illinois)	Mount Sterling	1940			(Note: Houses the New Deal mural The Covered Bridge by Henry Bernstein.)	
Washington Street Station Post Office (Naperville, Illinois)	Naperville	1939–1940				
United States Post Office (Nokomis, Illinois)	Nokomis	1941			(Note: Houses the New Deal artwork Coal Mining, a wood carving by Bernard J. "Tony" Rosenthal.)	
United States Post Office (Normal, Illinois)	Normal	1935		Louis A. Simon, Neal A. Melick	(Note: Houses the New Deal mural Development of the State Normal School by Albert Pels.)	
United States Post Office (Oak Park, Illinois)	Oak Park	1935–1936		Charles E. White Jr.	(Note: Houses four New Deal murals by J. Theodore Johnson.)	
United States Post Office (Oregon, Illinois)	Oregon	1938		Louis A. Simon, Neal A. Melick		
United States Post Office and Courthouse (Peoria, Illinois)	Peoria	1937–1938		Howard Lovewell Cheney, Louis A. Simon		
United States Post Office (Pittsfield, Illinois)	Pittsfield	1935		Louis A. Simon, Neal A. Melick	(Note: Houses the New Deal mural Champ Clark Bridge by William S. Schwartz.)	
United States Post Office and Courthouse (Quincy, Illinois)	Quincy	1887		Mifflin E. Bell		
United States Post Office (Rock Falls, Illinois)	Rock Falls	1937–1938			(Note: Houses two New Deal artworks The Manufacture of Farm Implements and Farming by Hand, terra cotta sculptures by Curt Drewes.)	
United States Post Office (Rushville, Illinois)	Rushville	1938			(Note: Houses the New Deal mural Hart Fellows, Builder of Rushville by Rainey Bennett.)	
United States Post Office (Shelbyville, Illinois)	Shelbyville	1940				
United States Post Office (Staunton, Illinois)	Staunton	1938			(Note: Houses the New Deal mural Going to Work by Ralf Henricksen.)	
United States Post Office (Sycamore, Illinois)	Sycamore	1914–1915			(Note: Contributing structure to the Sycamore Historic District.)	
United States Post Office (Vandalia, Illinois)	Vandalia	1935			(Note: Houses the New Deal mural Old State Capital in Vandalia, Illinois by Aaron Bohrod.)	
United States Post Office (Virden, Illinois)	Virden			Louis A. Simon, Neal A. Melick	(Note: Houses the New Deal mural Illinois Pastoral by James Daugherty.)	
United States Post Office (White Hall, Illinois)	White Hall	1937–1938			(Note: Houses the New Deal mural Potter and His Burro by Felix Schlag.)	
United States Post Office (Wilmette, Illinois)	Wilmette	c. 1938			(Note: Houses the New Deal mural In the Soil Is Our Wealth by Raymond Breinin.)	
United States Post Office (Wood River, Illinois)	Wood River	1934		Louis A. Simon, George O. Von Nerta	(Note: Houses the New Deal mural Stagecoach and Mail by Archibald Motley.)	
