= Brielmaier =

Brielmaier is a surname. Notable people with the surname include:

- Ben Brielmaier (born 1983), American football player
- Clotilde Elizabeth Brielmaier (1867–1915), American religious painter
- Bret Brielmaier (born 1985), American basketball coach
- Erhard Brielmaier (1841–1917), American architect
- Isolde Brielmaier (born 1971), American curator and scholar
