= Chicago Federal Building =

Skyscraper in Chicago, Illinois (1898–1965)

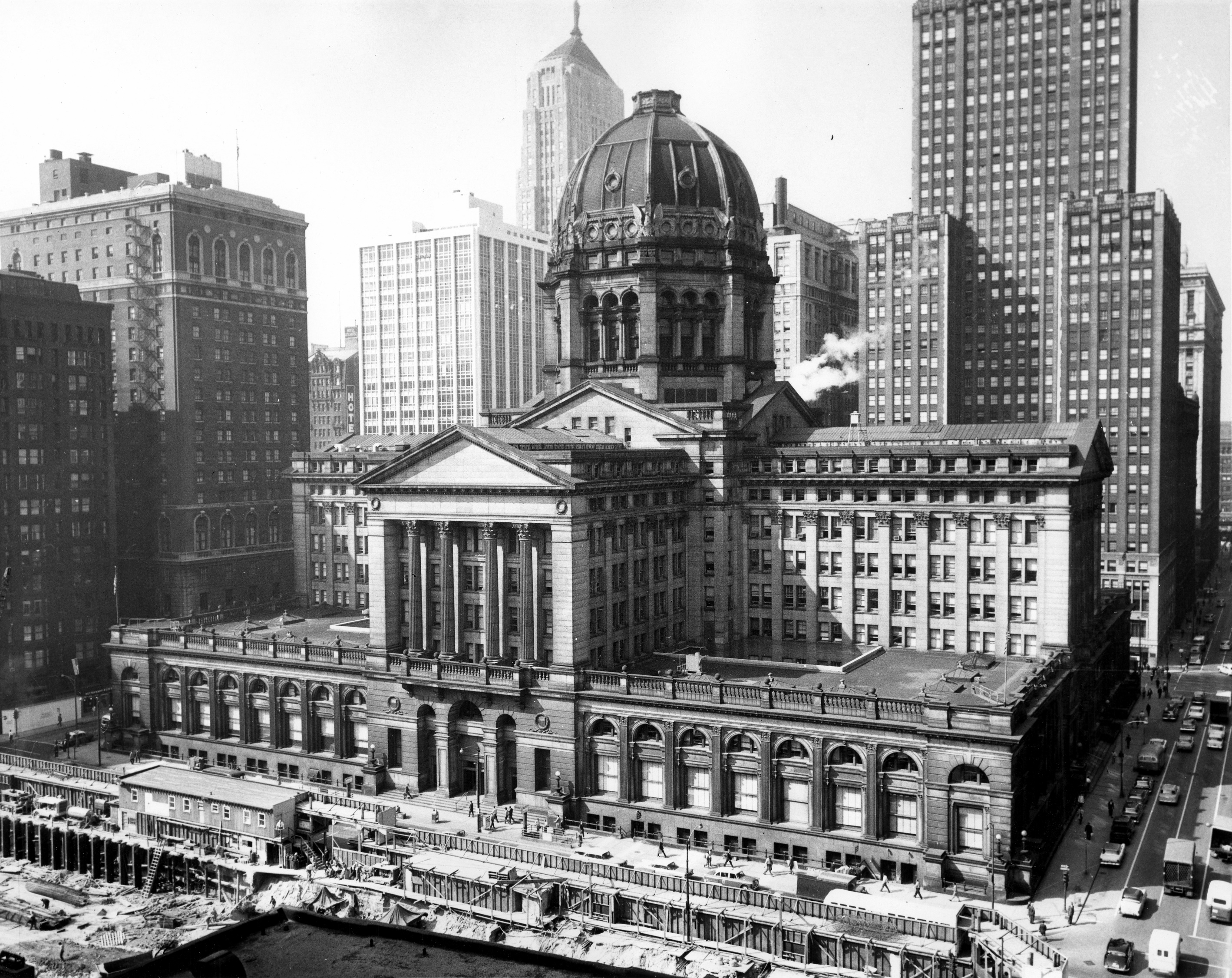
- The Chicago Federal Building looking southwest from Adams and Dearborn Streets with the Chicago Board of Trade Building visible behind the dome
- Interactive map of the Chicago Federal Building area

General information
- Architectural style: Beaux-Arts
- Location: Chicago, Illinois, United States
- Coordinates: 41.879191°N 87.629085°W
- Construction started: 1898
- Completed: 1905
- Demolished: 1965
- Client: US Federal Government

Design and construction
- Architect: Henry Ives Cobb

The Chicago Federal Building in Chicago, Illinois was constructed between 1898 and 1905 for the purpose of housing the Midwest's federal courts, main post office, and other government bureaus. It stood in The Loop neighborhood on a block bounded by Dearborn, Adams and Clark Streets and Jackson Boulevard. The site held an 1880 post office, courthouse and customhouse which was cleared to make way for the new building. The 1905 building was itself demolished in 1965 and replaced with the Kluczynski Federal Building.

The push for a new building was spearheaded by postmaster Washington Hesing with backing by civic leaders and Illinois's members of Congress. The explosion of Chicago's population, especially after the World's Columbian Exposition of 1893, strained the earlier facility beyond capacity. When the Exposition began, the Post Office Department in Chicago employed 998 clerks and 935 carriers. By the time Congress approved funding for a new building, the post office had expanded to 1,319 clerks and 1,096 carriers. Other agencies housed in the building complained of poor planning and shoddy construction which resulted in crumbling plaster, broken plumbing and flooding.

The new building was designed in the Beaux-Arts style by architect Henry Ives Cobb. The floorplan was a six-story Greek cross atop a two-story base with a raised basement. The building was capped by a dome at the crossing that held an additional eight floors of office space in its drum for a total of 16 floors. The gilt dome extended 100 ft (30 m) above the drum.

== Construction ==
Congress passed a bill in late 1894 that President Grover Cleveland signed on February 13, 1895, appropriating $4 million to demolish the existing structure on the site and erect a new one. The 1880 building was considered dangerous, and it was inadequate to house all the federal agencies in the city whose offices consequently were spread among several buildings.

On January 20, 1896, Congress approved an additional $25,000 to employ a special architect. The Chicago Federal Building was the first government structure constructed with the purpose of housing the post office.

Demolition began on the old building in June 1896 after the post office relocated to a temporary building on the site now occupied by the 333 North Michigan Avenue Building. Foundation work began in August 1897 and was completed in September 1898 at a cost of $208,000. The foundation was supported by wooden piles driven 72 feet (22 m) below street level. The basement and first two floors covered the entire site and measured 321 ft (98 m) by 361 ft (110 m).

On April 30, 1898, work for the superstructure was awarded to John Pierce, a New York contractor, who submitted a bid of $1,897,000. The building took seven years to construct because government policy at the time was to appropriate only enough funds for each contract as it was awarded. There was no general contractor, and over 100 separate contracts were awarded during construction.

The completed building reached a height of 297 ft (91 m) and was dedicated by President William McKinley on October 9, 1899, the twenty-eighth anniversary of the Great Chicago Fire. The areas for the post office were completed in 1904 and other agencies occupied their spaces in 1905.

== Architecture ==
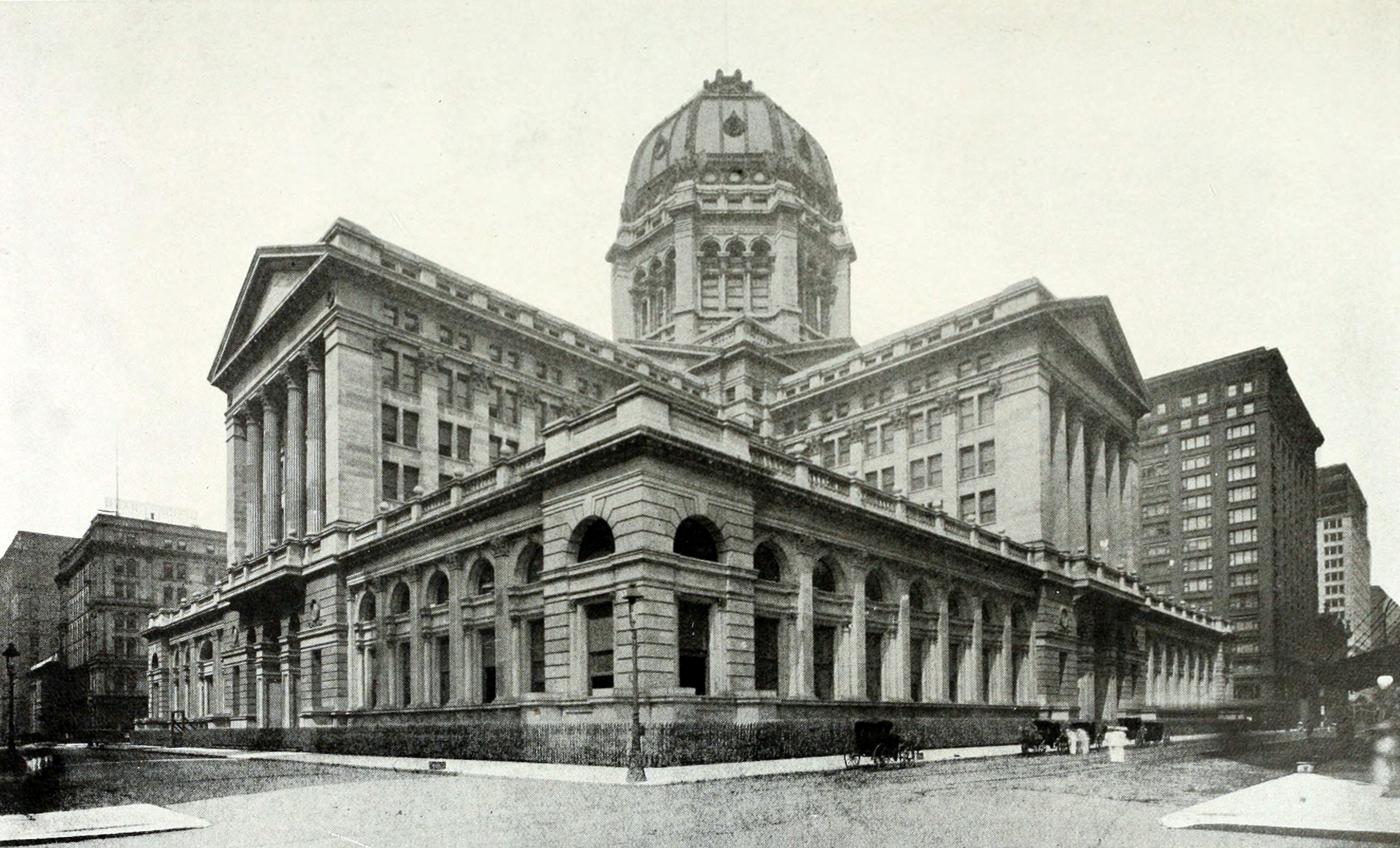
Federal Building looking northwest from Dearborn and Jackson ca. 1910

The Federal Building was constructed over a steel frame with exterior walls of brick sheathed with 500,000 sq ft (46,000 m^{2}) of gray granite from Mount Waldo, Maine. The roofs were covered vitrified tile over book tile while the dome was covered with gilt glass tiles. The plan called for the post office to occupy the basement and two lower floors. The sixth, seventh and eighth floors of one wing held the courts, judges, clerks and US Marshal. The floors in the dome were reserved for the Civil Service Commission, Railway Mail Service and weather bureau with other agencies occupying the remaining space.

The base consisted of a central entry on each facade flanked by eight bays of windows. The bays were separated by Corinthian pilasters with arches over the windows of the second floor. A cornice and balustrade topped the base on all four facades. Four Corinthian columns extending from the third to sixth floor supported a pediment on the face of each arm of the cross. The wings on the north-south axis held seven bays long while the wings on the east-west axis held five bays as the building was situated on a rectangular lot. The bays each held two windows grouped vertically and were separated by Corinthian pilasters. The eighth floor was housed in shed dormers extending from the gabled roof. The dome was octagonal with a buttress at each corner of the drum. The buttresses were topped by corbels supporting a large double cornice encircling the sixteenth floor with a large eagle perched atop the corbels. The windows of the ninth through twelfth floors were set into three arches supported by more Corinthian columns. Between the eagles were three circular windows with elaborately carved frames, and above, another circular window pierced the midpoint of each face of the dome.

After construction was complete, more than $2,000,000 remained for interior decoration of the Chicago Federal Building. The four wings met under the dome to form an octagonal rotunda, inspired by Imperial Roman architecture, that was open to the ninth floor. The rotunda's 100 ft (30 m) diameter made it larger than that of the United States Capitol in Washington, D.C. The federal building was also the tallest capitol-style building constructed in Chicago, with the exception of the 1893 World's Columbian Exposition buildings, most of which were demolished. Under the dome was a large public space surrounded by the floors containing office space.

The interior details were accented with terra cotta and scagliola. Doors were oak with brass hardware and "US" molded into doorknobs. Mahogany was used in courtrooms and other offices. Marble from Tennessee, Vermont, Maine and Italy was used in corridor floors, wainscoting and stairways. Floors in the rotunda were marble accented with mosaic tile while railings and elevator grilles throughout the building were wrought iron. Ceilings were framed by egg-and-dart mouldings. The four courtrooms on the sixth floor contained a series of murals depicting historical moments in the development of law.

== Notable events ==
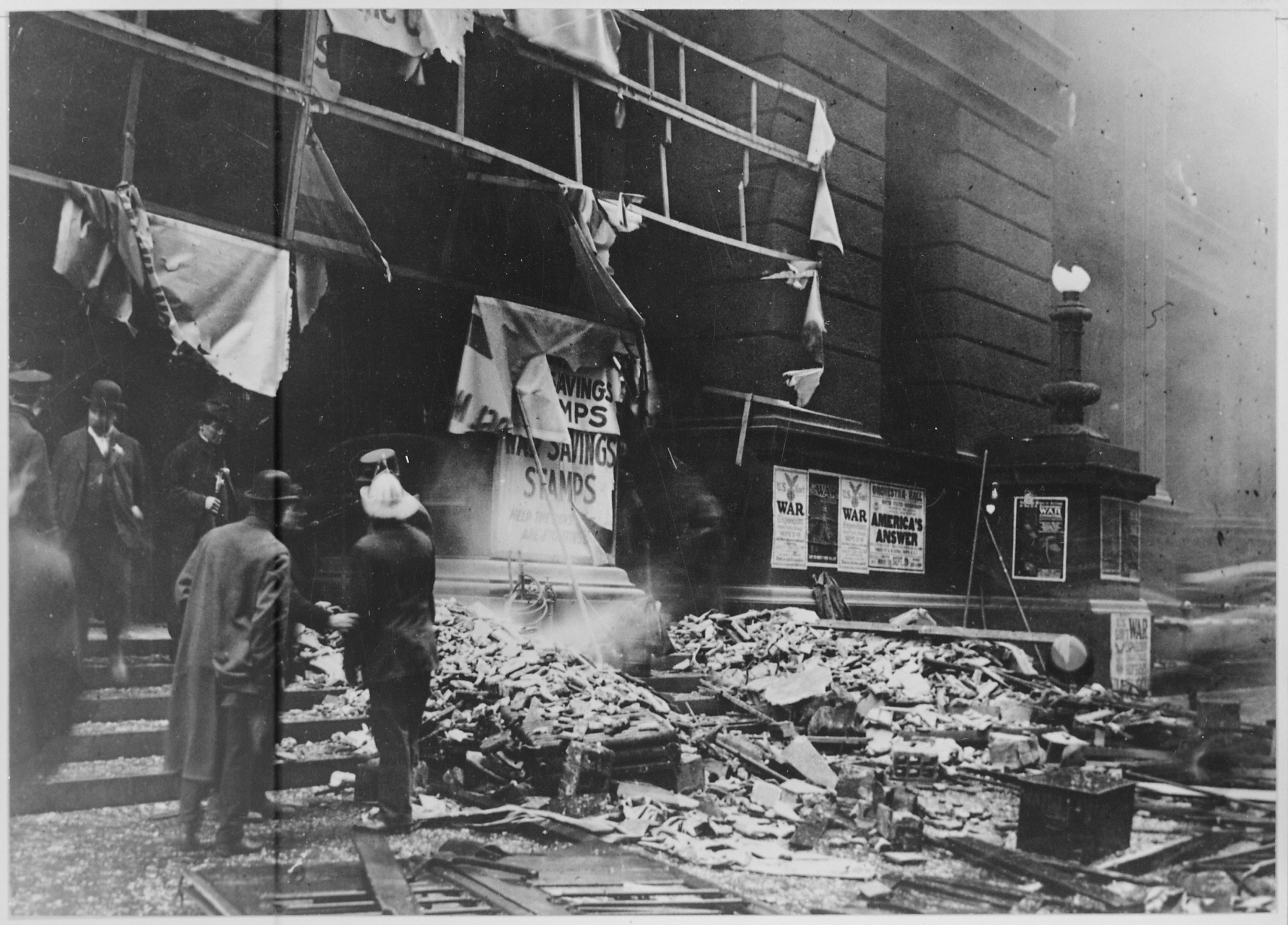
Adams Street entrance after the 1918 bombing

The Building housed the United States District Court for the Northern District of Illinois until 1964 and the United States Court of Appeals for the Seventh Circuit until 1938. The Federal Weather Bureau maintained offices in the dome and took official measurements from July 1, 1905 until December 31, 1925, when the official weather station moved to the University of Chicago campus. The Federal Building site maintained supplemental observation equipment until 1970.

In 1907, Judge Kenesaw Mountain Landis presided over an antitrust case against Standard Oil in which the company was fined $29 million for accepting freight rebates from the railroads. The verdict was later set aside but in 1920, Landis went on to become the first Commissioner of Baseball.

A powerful bomb exploded on the building's north side September 4, 1918, killing four people and injuring 75 others, destroying the entrance doors and damaging windows of buildings across Adams Street. Two mail clerks and two patrons were killed in the explosion, which was immediately blamed upon the radical Industrial Workers of the World, which had recently been involved in a mass trial at the location. On September 7, 1918, police arrested a suspect with close ties to the IWW organization.

Walt Disney worked at the post office in the building from July until September 1918.

Authorities discovered another bomb on October 31, 1921, before the device exploded. There was no damage to the building or its occupants.

In 1931, the courtroom of Judge James Herbert Wilkerson was the location for the trial of gangster Al Capone. On October 24, 1931, Wilkerson sentenced Capone to a 10-year prison sentence and a fine of $50,000 for tax evasion. His conviction was upheld by the appellate court December 20, 1937.

The District and Circuit courts and several agencies relocated to the new Dirksen Federal Building across Dearborn Street, and the building was demolished in 1965. The 45-floor Kluczynski Federal Building and Loop Postal Station, designed by Ludwig Mies van der Rohe, were built in its place. The plaza between the three structures is the setting for Alexander Calder's sculpture Flamingo.

== See also ==
- Chicago architecture
