= Fessler =

Fessler is a surname. Notable people with the surname include:

- Ignaz Aurelius Fessler (1756–1839), Hungarian cleric, politician, historian, and freemason
- Josef Fessler (1813–1872), Austrian bishop and patrologist
- Thomasita Fessler (1912–2005), American painter and religious sister
