= Clotilde Elizabeth Brielmaier =

German-American religious painter

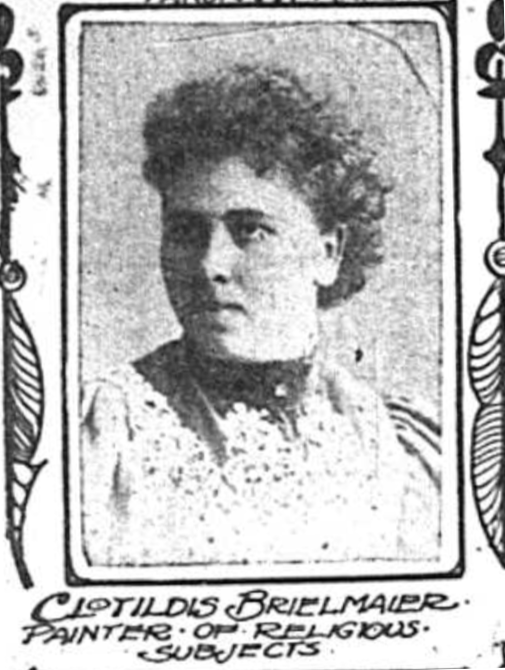
- Born: 4 March 1867; Piqua, Ohio
- Died: 29 March 1915 (aged 48); Milwaukee, Wisconsin
- Resting place: Calvary Cemetery and Mausoleum, Milwaukee, Wisconsin, USA
- Parents: Erhard Brielmaier (father); Theresia Haag Brielmaier (mother)

Clotilde Elizabeth Brielmaier (March 4, 1867 – March 29, 1915), sometimes called "Lottie" Brielmaier, was a German-American religious painter, specializing in portraits and church murals. She was the daughter of the famous Milwaukee architect Erhard Brielmaier and often collaborated with her family members on projects. She spent several years, as many as twenty, studying at the art centers of Europe including Munich and Rome. She is said to be the first female artist to establish her own studio in the United States, which was located in the now demolished University Building in Milwaukee, Wisconsin.

Her younger brother, architect Leo Anthony Brielmaier, founded the Clotilde Brielmaier Art Scholarship Fund at Cardinal Stritch University in 1964.

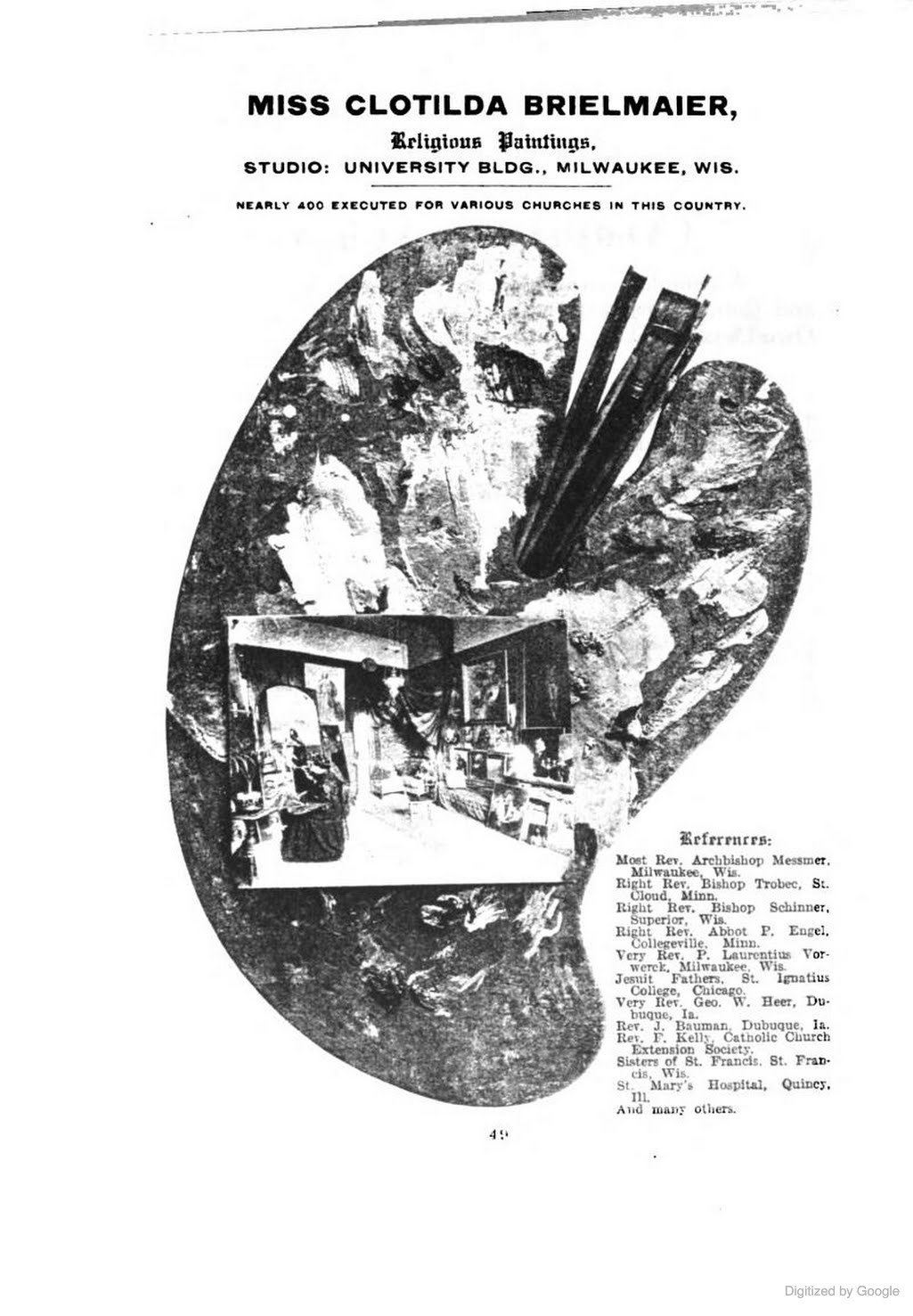
Ad for Clotilde Brielmaier with the artist in her studio, 1908

== Notable collections and church projects ==
- Sisters of St. Francis of Assisi, Milwaukee, Wisconsin.
- Milwaukee County Historical Society, Milwaukee, Wisconsin.
- Basilica of St. Josaphat, Milwaukee, Wisconsin.
- Franciscan Church of the Sacred Heart, Indianapolis, Indiana.
- St. Francis Solanus Church, Quincy, Illinois.
- Basilica of St. Francis Xavier, Dyersville, Iowa.
