= Gonippo Raggi =

Italian sculptor(1875–1959)

Gonippo Raggi (May 6, 1875 – October 22, 1959) was an Italian artist who provided murals for many churches and church institutions in the United States.

== Early childhood and education ==
He was born in Rome, Italy, in 1875. He was a prize graduate of St. Luke's Royal Academy in Rome and his artistic talent brought him membership in the Pontifical Academy of Virtuosi al Pantheon.

== Artistic practice ==
He came to the United States in 1904 at the invitation of Papal Marquis Martin Maloney to supervise the decoration of St. Catharine Church in Spring Lake, New Jersey. Maloney had erected the church as a memorial to his daughter, Catherine. Raggi drew the attention of Rev. Thomas J. Walsh, then Bishop of Trenton. When Walsh became Bishop of Newark, he encouraged Raggi to continue his work in the Newark diocese. Raggi was internationally acclaimed as a portraitist and ecclesiastical artist. and supervised the decoration of the Cathedral of the Sacred Heart in Newark. He died in 1959.

Several of the buildings containing Raggi's murals have been placed on the National Register of Historic Places. All of Raggi's paintings done before 1915 were cataloged by the Smithsonian Institution. Other work by Raggi is cataloged by the Boston Public Library, Department of Fine Arts.

== Raggi works ==
- Basilica of St. Josaphat, Milwaukee, Wisconsin
- St. Patrick Pro Cathedral, Newark, New Jersey
- St. Catharine Church, Spring Lake, New Jersey
- Cathedral Basilica of the Sacred Heart, Newark, New Jersey
- St. Lucy's Church, Newark, New Jersey
- Immaculate Conception Seminary Chapel, Darlington, New Jersey
- Our Lady of Good Counsel Church, Newark, New Jersey
- St. Mary of Mount Virgin Church, New Brunswick, New Jersey
- Villa Walsh Convent Chapel, Morristown, New Jersey
- Notre Dame Church, Southbridge, Massachusetts
- Our Lady of Mount Carmel Church, Orange, New Jersey
- Liberal Arts Building and Rotunda at Marywood College, Scranton, Pennsylvania
- St. John The Baptist Catholic Church, Beloit, Kansas
- Chapel, St. John Seminary, Brighton, Boston, Massachusetts
- Our Lady of Victory Basilica, Lackawanna, New York
- Mary Immaculate of Lourdes Church (Newton, Massachusetts)
- Shrine of the Little Flower Catholic Church, Baltimore, Maryland
- St. John the Evangelist Church, Pittston, PA
