= St. Catharine Church, Spring Lake =

Church in New Jersey, United States

Coordinates: 40.147571°N 74.029497°W

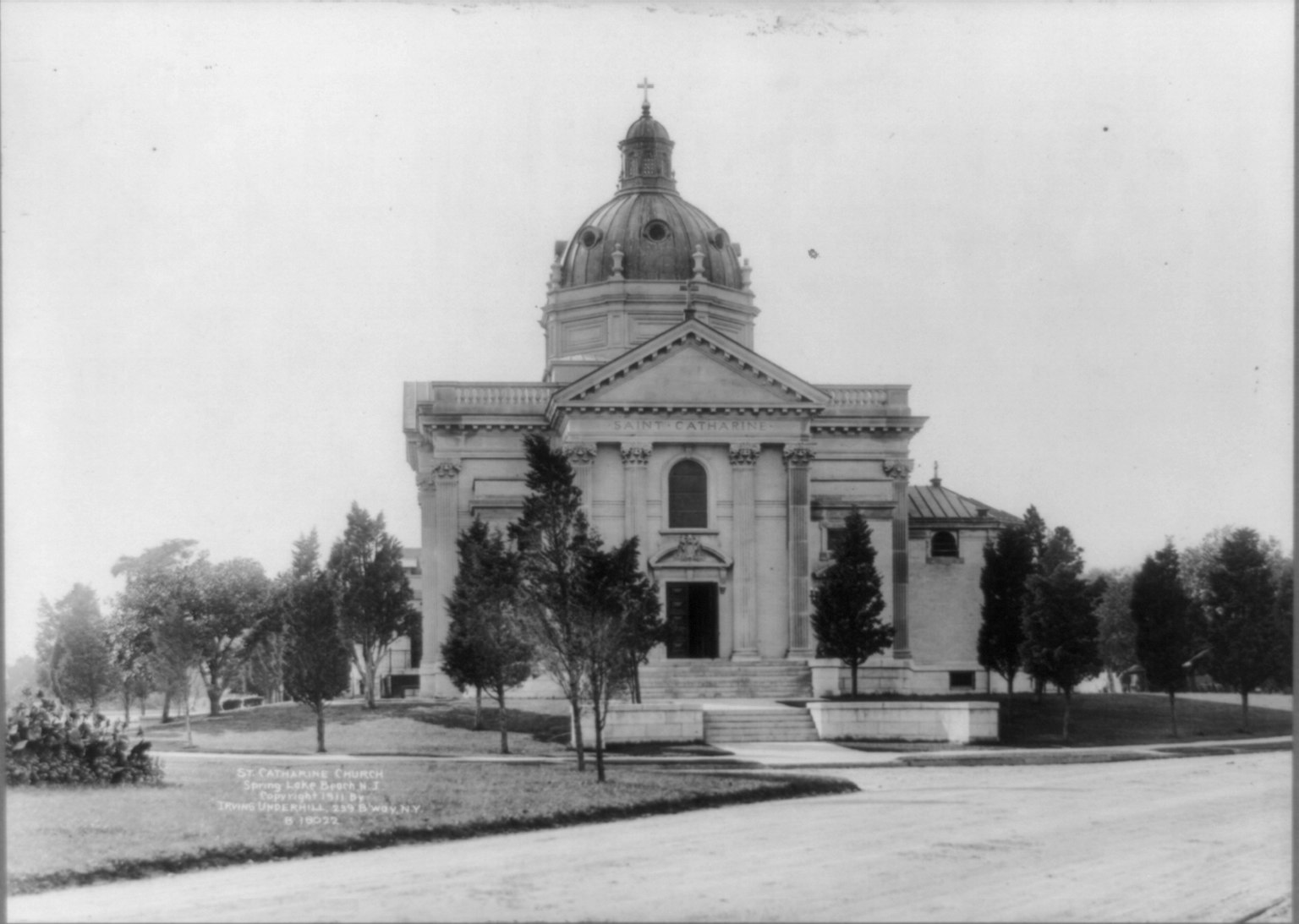
In 1911

St. Catharine Church is a Catholic church in Spring Lake, New Jersey, used by the Parish of the St. Catharine & St. Margaret in the Diocese of Trenton.

Built in 1901, it has been described by the Monmouth County Historical Commission as "the finest high-style example of Classical Revival architecture in Monmouth County." Its interior is decorated with 27 canvas and fresco paintings by Gonippo Raggi, both replicas and original work, as well as Irish-themed murals which were made by Raggi and Chicago-based artist Thomas A. O'Shaughnessy.
