= Flying Dragon (Calder) =

Sculpture by Alexander Calder

- Artist: Alexander Calder
- Year: 1975
- Type: painted steel plate
- Dimensions: 365 cm × 335 cm × 579 cm (144 in × 132 in × 228 in)
- Location: Art Institute of Chicago (outdoor), Chicago, IL; 41.880284°N 87.62368°W

Flying Dragon is a sculpture by Alexander Calder in the Art Institute of Chicago North Stanley McCormick Memorial Court (aka North Garden) north of the Art Institute of Chicago Building in the Loop community area of Chicago, Illinois. It is a painted steel plate work of art created in 1975 measuring 365 (H) x 579 (L) x 335 (W) cm (120 x 228 x 132 in.). It is painted in the signature "Calder Red" (which is also used in the nearby Flamingo) and is intended to represent a dragonfly in flight.

== Stabiles ==
Although Calder is better known for his mobile sculptures often called mobiles, in the later years of his life he produced stationary sculptures (also called stabiles). In 1975, Calder produced a series of Flying Dragon sculptures, one of which sold at auction at Sotheby's New York: Wednesday, May 10, 2006. Completed in 1975, the Flying Dragon is thought to be the final stabile that Calder personally created. He died less than a year later at the age of seventy-eight

== Acquisition ==
A gift of Mr. and Mrs. Sidney L. Port made this acquisition possible.

== See also ==
- List of Alexander Calder public works
