= United States Post Office (Mattoon, Illinois) =

- U.S. Post Office
- U.S. National Register of Historic Places
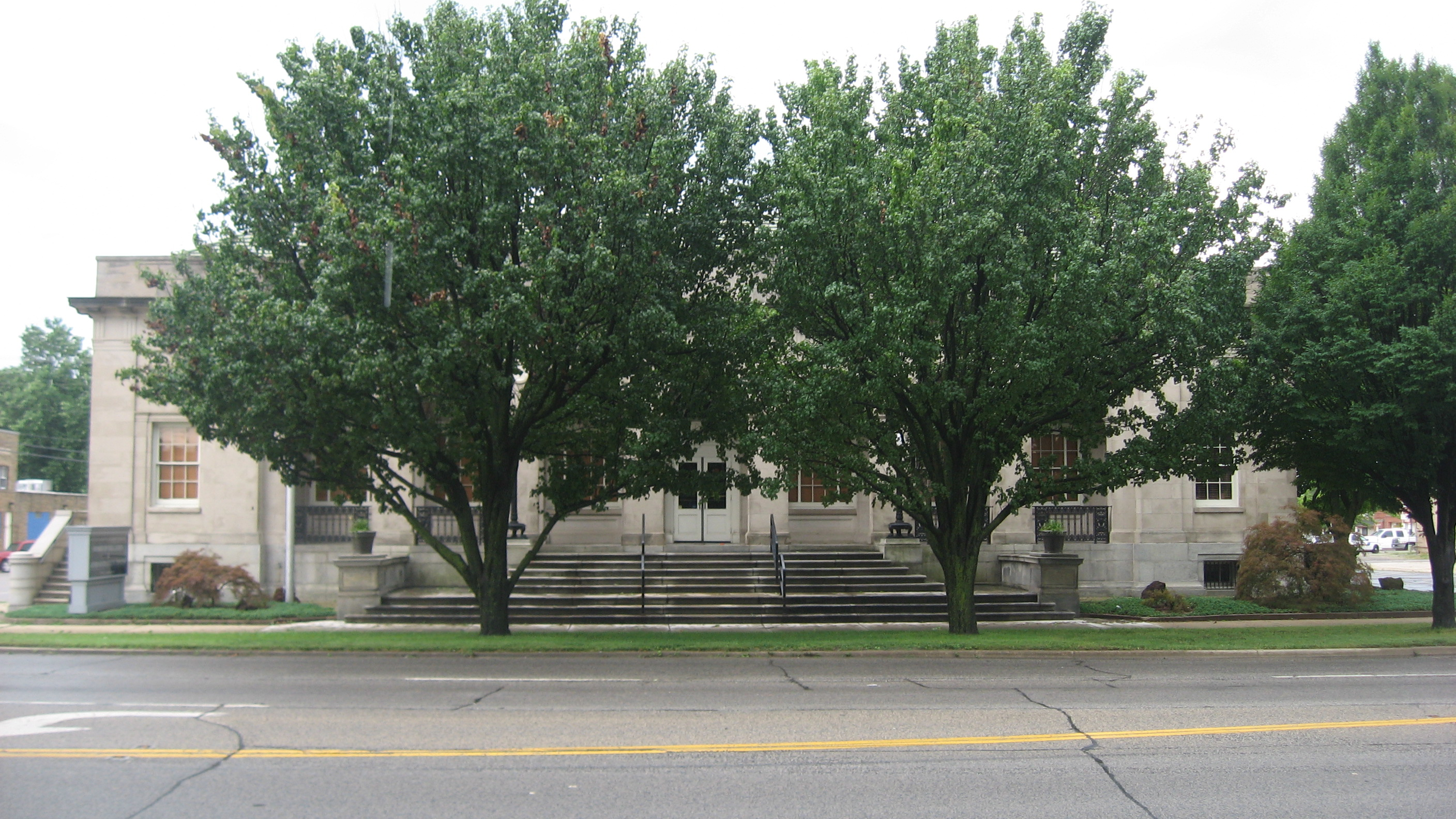
- Front of the post office

- Location within Illinois Location within the United States
- Location: 1701 Charleston Ave., Mattoon, Illinois
- Coordinates: 39°28′53″N 88°22′32″W
- Area: 0.5 acres (0.20 ha)
- Built: 1913
- Built by: Mangnus Yeager & Son
- Architect: James K. Taylor
- Architectural style: Classical Revival
- NRHP reference No.: 79000818
- Added to NRHP: December 6, 1979

The United States Post Office, located at 1701 Charleston Ave., is the former main post office of Mattoon, Illinois. The post office was constructed in 1913 by Mangnus Yeager & Son, a building company from Danville, Illinois. The building was designed in the Classical Revival style and features Renaissance Revival influences; James K. Taylor was the Supervising Architect for the building. The front of the building features seven arches in front of a portico containing the entrance, which is located at the top of a marble staircase. The three central arches are topped by a carved frieze, and marble cartouches separate each pair of arches. The building served as Mattoon's post office from its construction until 1980, when a new post office opened.

The building was listed on the National Register of Historic Places in 1979.

== See also ==
- List of United States post offices
