= Erhard Brielmaier =

American architect

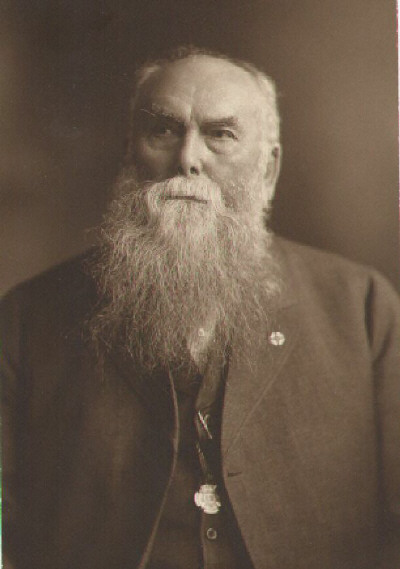
Erhard Brielmaier

Erhard Brielmaier (January 7, 1841 – August 29, 1917) was an architect, woodworker, and sculptor active in the United States and Canada from the late 19th century through the early 20th century. It has been claimed that he and his sons designed and built more churches and hospitals than any other architect.

== History ==
Brielmaier was born in Neufra, Kingdom of Württemberg, in 1841. In 1850, he and his siblings journeyed with their mother to America to join their father, a carpenter who had made his way to Saint Jacobs, Ohio. On November 27, 1860, Brielmaier married Theresia Haag, and they had 13 children. In 1873, the clan moved to Milwaukee, where Brielmaier and his children advanced from humble beginnings to an architectural firm active in the US and Canada up to the 1960s.

Brielmaier's sons Bernard Anselm, Joseph Mary, and Leo Anthony received training in architecture, and with them he established the firm E. Brielmaier & Sons Co., Architects, which constructed over a thousand Catholic churches, schools, and hospitals. They had offices in Chicago and Milwaukee in the late 19th century and 20th centuries. E. Brielmaier & Sons focused on the design of churches, hospitals (such as the Mayo Clinic Hospital), and schools and university buildings (for example at Marquette University).

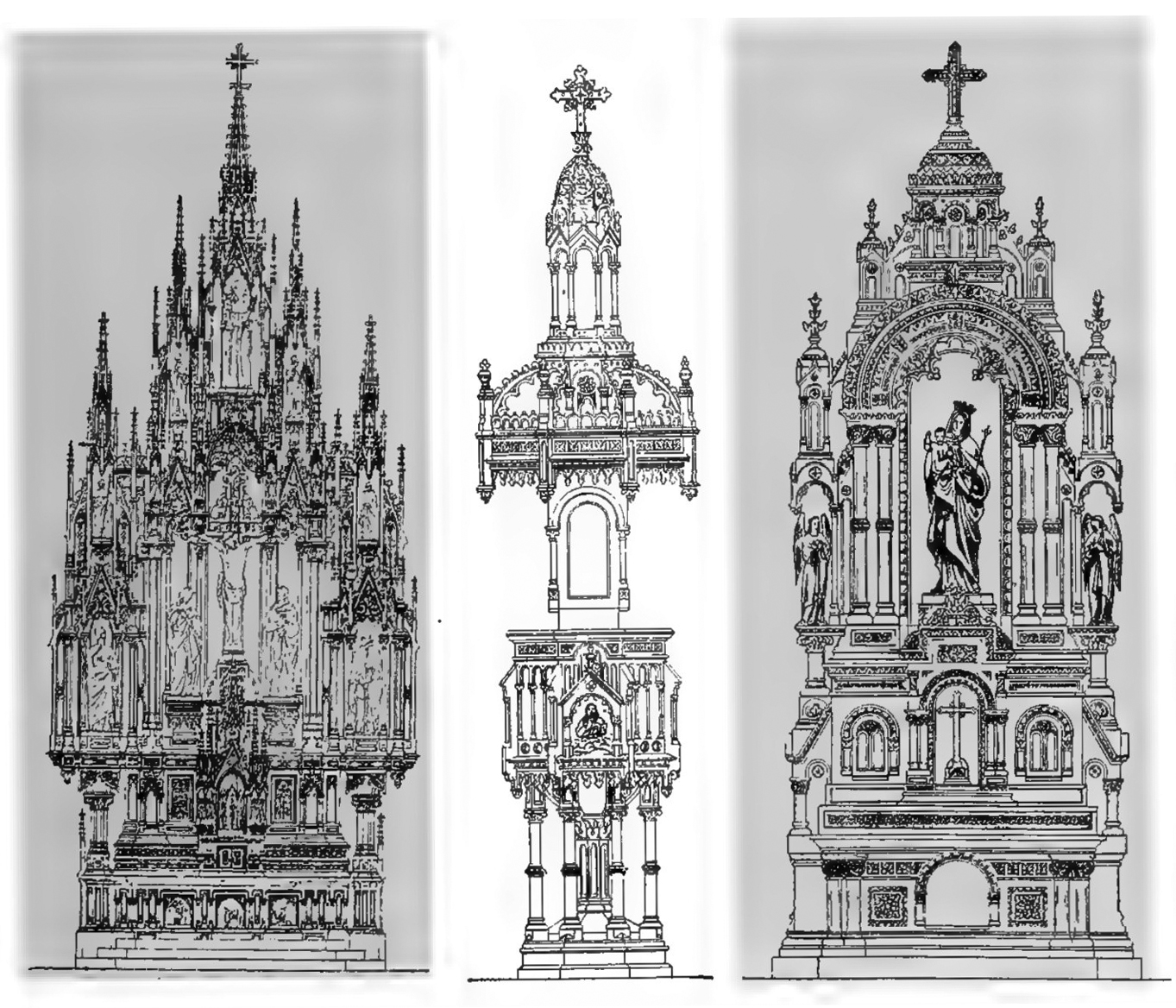
Altar and pulpit designs for a wood workshop supervised by Brielmaier

In 1861 Brielmaier designed a neo-Gothic chapel for the Sisters of St. Francis of Assisi of St. Francis, Wisconsin. Its stained glass windows were imported from Innsbruck, Austria. Three of his granddaughters subsequently joined the community. Brielmaier was directly involved with St. John's Institute for Deaf-Mutes in St. Francis, serving as superintendant of its Industrial Department at which pupils were trained in the manufacture of church furniture such as altars, confessionals, baptismal fonts, stations, statues, pulpits, etc.

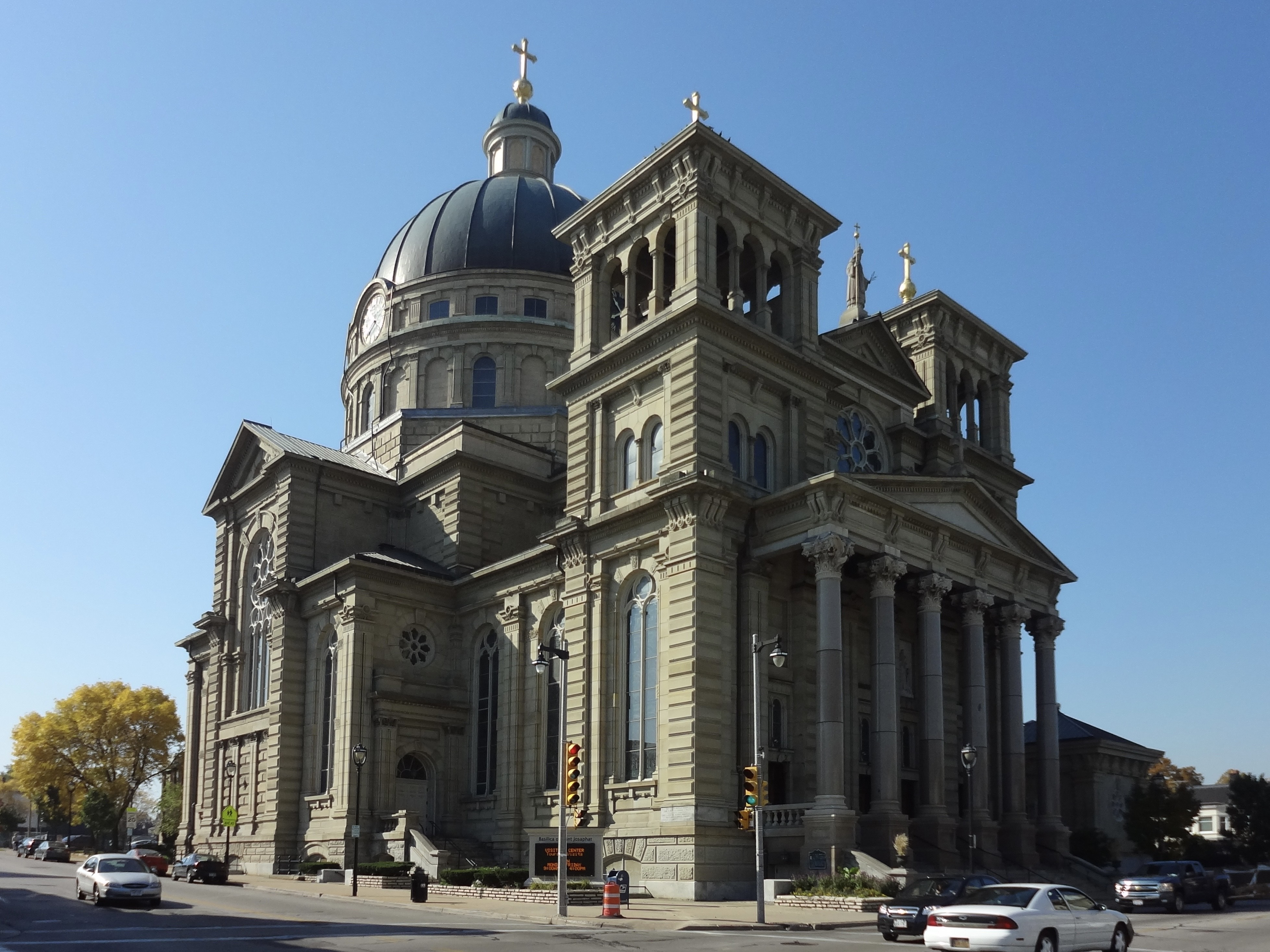
Basilica of St. Josaphat

In the Milwaukee area there are some 30 buildings by Brielmaier and his sons designated with landmarked status. The most notable is the Basilica of St. Josaphat, which was based on St. Peter's Basilica in Rome. At the time of its construction, St. Josaphat's had one of the largest cupolas in the world. The edifice made use of materials recycled from a US Post Office dismantled in Chicago. Its postal emblems appear as brass ornaments on the basilica's entrance doors. Saint Anthony of Padua Catholic Church, on Ninth and Mitchell in Milwaukee, is another remarkable church for which he provided the high altar, four side altars, and pulpit.

Brielmaier was deeply involved with the education of his children, several of whom followed in his footsteps and became artists. His oldest son, John (Johannes) Erhard Brielmaier (September 4, 1861–September 9, 1913), trained in wood sculpting in Stuttgart. Johannes's artwork is found throughout the United States, mostly in altars and other church sculptures. His works are revered for their depth and elaborate carvings of magnificent detail.

Brielmaier's daughter Clotilde Elizabeth Brielmaier (March 4, 1867–March 29, 1915) spent several years in Munich and Rome studying art. Her works are preserved in Europe as well as the United States. She is recognized as a woman who could stand alongside the male artists of her time, and she was the first woman to own her own art studio in the United States. Many of her paintings, especially the murals in chapels and churches, have been lost over the years, either because of natural disaster or through the simplification policy of the Catholic Church. Some of her large portraits are held by historical museums in the United States.

The next generation of artists, grandchildren of Erhard Brielmaier, includes Sr. Thomasita Fessler, who was born Majella Nicola Fessler (February 23, 1912 –April 1, 2005). She established and chaired the art department at Cardinal Stritch College, and she founded the Studio San Damiano based on her philosophy that "Nature is God's art and art is man's nature." Another maxim of the Brielmaier tradition states, "A child who learns to create will not destroy."

Another grandchild, Carl R. Brielmaier, continued the church painting tradition. Born on May 12, 1892, he left his immediate family as a youngster and studied with his aunt Clothilde Brielmaier. He used different names within his life and work, including the name Erhard, so the works credited to him are at times uncertain. His church paintings are to be found primarily in Wisconsin, Michigan, and Ohio. The family's art tradition continues with his daughter, Rose Brielmaier.

Erhard Brielmaier died in Milwaukee in 1917 and was buried there at Calvary Cemetery, for which he designed both the Gothic Revival style Gate House and neo-Romanesque Chapel.
