= United States Post Office and Courthouse (Quincy, Illinois) =

- U.S. Post Office and Courthouse
- U.S. National Register of Historic Places
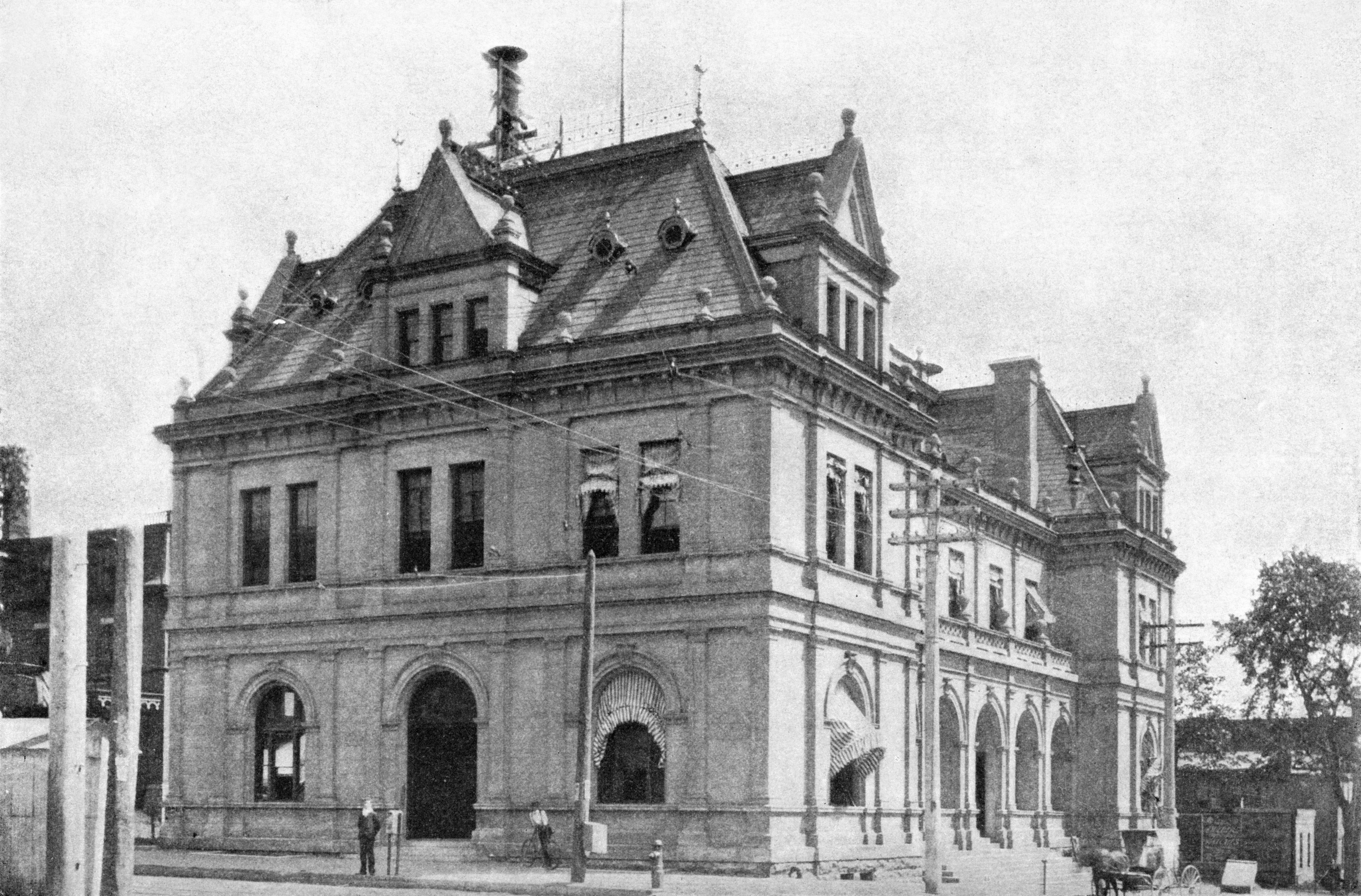

- Location within Illinois Location within the United States
- Interactive map showing the location of the U.S Post Office and Court House, Quincy
- Location: 200 N. 8th St., Quincy, Illinois
- Coordinates: 39°56′1″N 91°24′10″W
- Area: 1.3 acres (0.53 ha)
- Built: 1887
- Architect: Bell, Mifflin E.
- Architectural style: French Renaissance
- NRHP reference No.: 77000472
- Added to NRHP: December 2, 1977

The U.S. Post Office and Courthouse is a post office and federal courthouse located at 200 North Eighth Street in Quincy, Illinois. The building was designed in 1885 and completed in 1887. Architect Mifflin E. Bell, Supervising Architect at the time, designed the French Renaissance Revival style building. Bell's design was inspired by Richard Morris Hunt's design for the William K. Vanderbilt House in New York City; at the time, the French Renaissance Revival style had not spread to Illinois, which made Bell's work distinctive in the region. The building's design features a limestone exterior, arched entrances and first-floor windows, and an ornate roof with pointed gables and dormers.

The building, also known as the Orville H. Browning Station, was listed on the National Register of Historic Places on December 2, 1977.

== See also ==
- List of United States federal courthouses in Illinois
- List of United States post offices
