= United States Post Office (Joliet, Illinois) =

- U.S. Post Office, Joliet, Illinois
- U.S. National Register of Historic Places
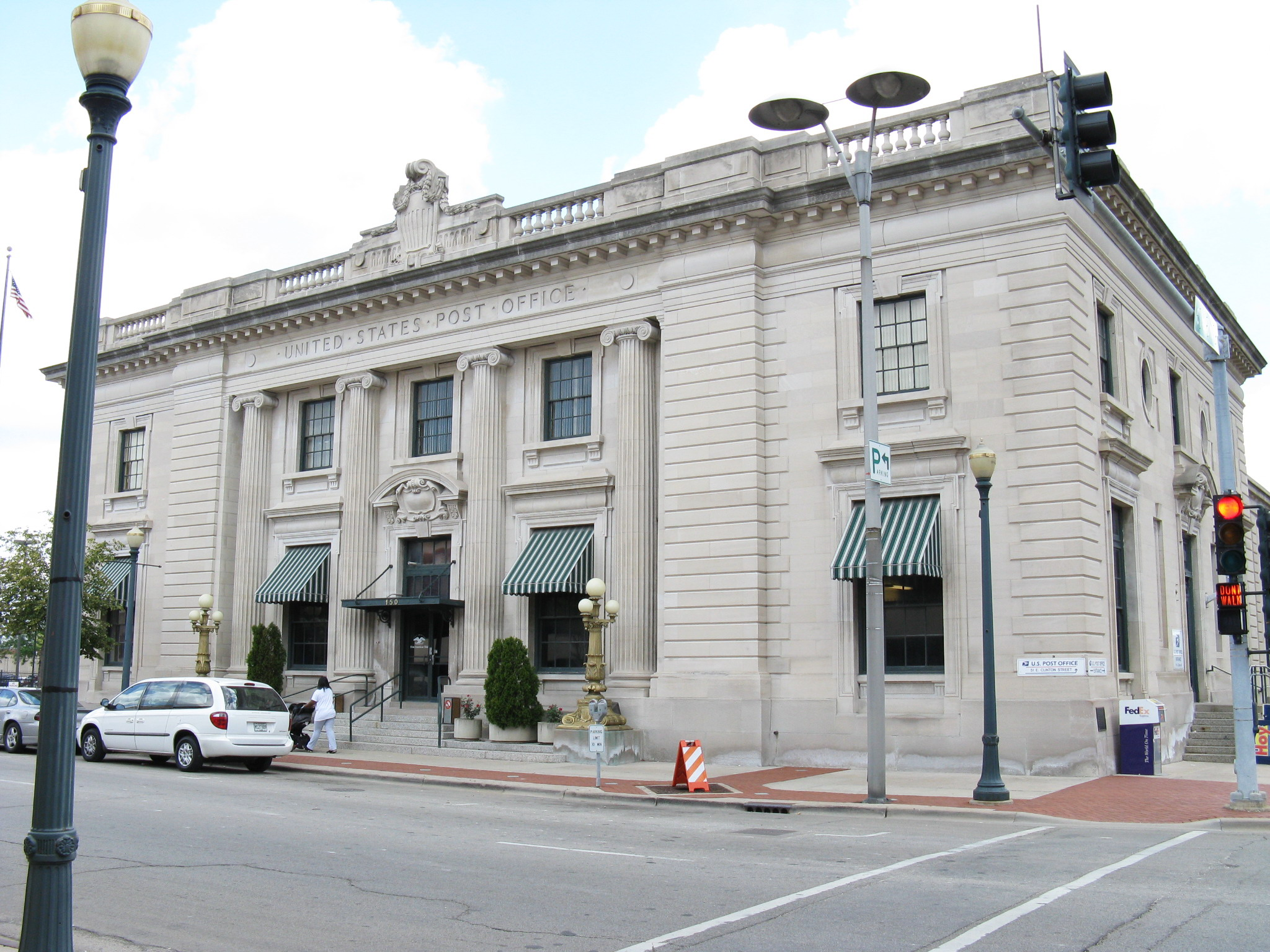

- Location within Illinois Location within the United States
- Location: 150 North Scott Street; Joliet, Will County, Illinois, U.S.
- Coordinates: 41°31′39″N 88°4′49″W
- Built: 1903; 123 years ago
- Architect: James Knox Taylor
- Architectural style: Renaissance Revival
- NRHP reference No.: 81000223
- Added to NRHP: August 20, 1981

The U.S. Post Office in Joliet, Illinois, is a two-story, building designed by James Knox Taylor. Plans for the Post Office were made in 1899 when Congress approved $100,000 for its construction. The property was purchased from the Robinson family for $15,000. Joliet's rapid growth in the early 20th century necessitated an expansion, and Congress allowed $185,000 for additional land purchase and post office expansion. This was the last major structural change to the building. It operated as the post office for Joliet from 1903 until 1981, when a new building was constructed. It was added to the National Register of Historic Places the year it closed.

== See also ==
- List of United States post offices
