= Basilica of St. Josaphat =

Minor basilica in Milwaukee, Wisconsin, United States

Basilica of Saint Josaphat
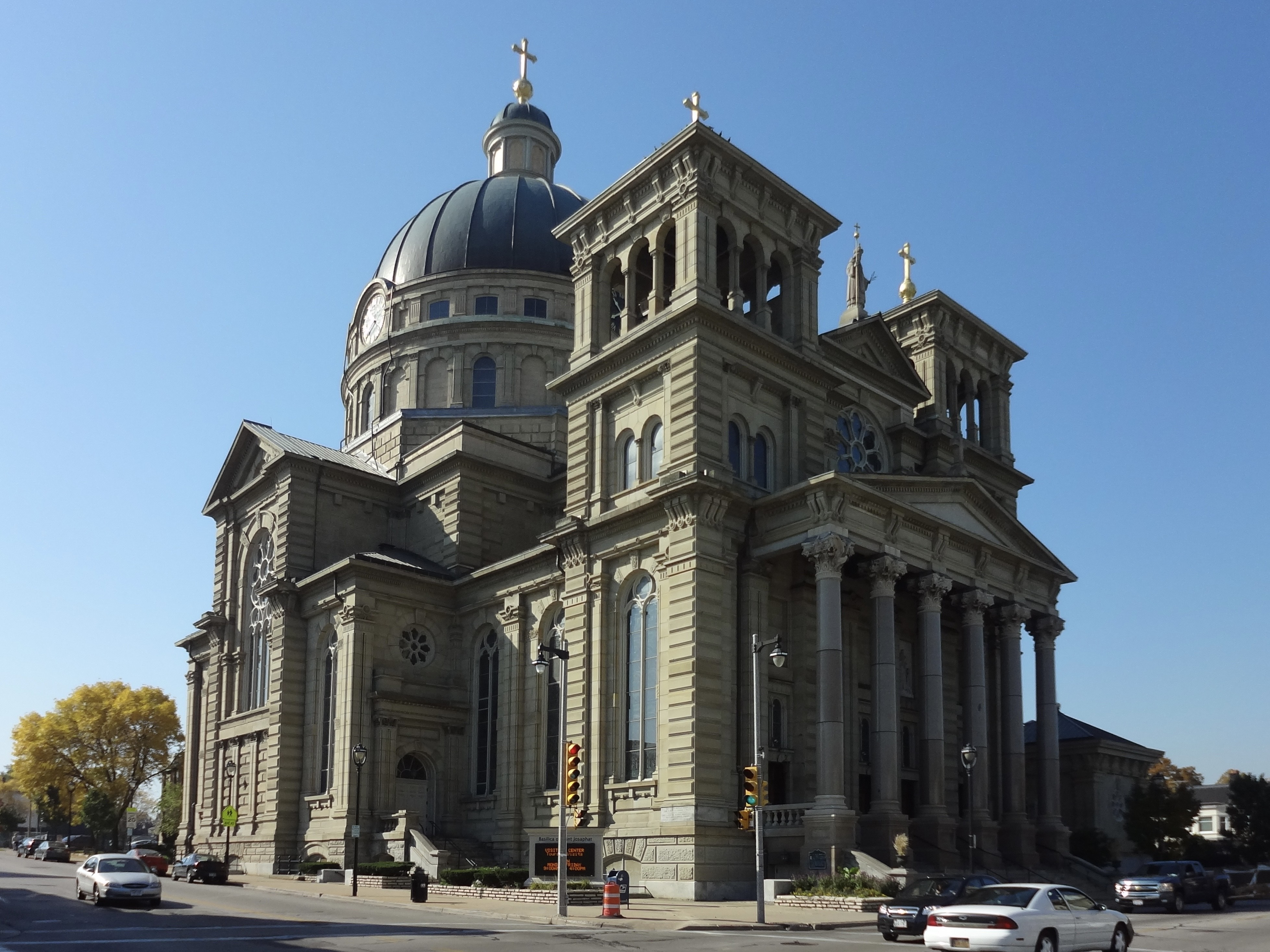
- The Basilica of St. Josaphat

- Location within Wisconsin

Religion
- Affiliation: Roman Catholic
- Province: Archdiocese of Milwaukee
- Ecclesiastical or organizational status: Minor basilica
- Status: Active

Location
- Location: Milwaukee, Wisconsin, US
- Interactive map of Basilica of Saint Josaphat
- Coordinates: 43°00′09″N 87°55′09″W

Architecture
- Architects: Erhard Brielmaier (architect); Gonippo Raggi (painter)
- Type: Church
- Style: Polish cathedral style
- Completed: 1901
- U.S. National Register of Historic Places
- Official name: Basilica of St. Josaphat
- Designated: March 7, 1973
- Reference no.: 73000089
- Governing body: Private

Website
- thebasilica.org

The Basilica of St. Josaphat is a Catholic minor basilica in the Lincoln Village neighborhood of Milwaukee, Wisconsin, United States. It was built in 1901 in the Polish cathedral style by Milwaukee's Polish immigrant community. The basilica is named for Josaphat Kuntsevych, a Ruthenian martyr and saint.

The basilica was constructed with materials from the former US Custom House, Court House, and Post Office in Chicago. Pope Pius XI designated St. Josaphat Church as the third minor basilica in the US in 1929. It is listed on the National Register of Historic Places and is a designated Milwaukee Landmark.

== History ==
Video tour of the basilica

Poles began immigrating to Milwaukee in the 1840s, and by the late 19th century they were the second-largest ethnic group in the city following German Americans. In 1866, Saint Stanislaus parish was founded—the first urban Polish parish in the US. The Saint Josaphat congregation branched off from Saint Stanislaus in 1888, but the first church building burned in 1889. Pastor Wilhelm Grutza commissioned Erhard Brielmaier, a prominent church architect of the late 19th and early 20th centuries, to design a new church in 1896 after the congregation outgrew the rebuilt structure. Like a number of other Polish churches, it was designed in the Polish cathedral style. Like St. Mary of the Angels in Chicago and Immaculate Heart of Mary in Pittsburgh, the architectural plans were modeled on St. Peter's Basilica in Rome.

As the design neared completion, Father Grutza learned that the U.S. Custom House, Court House, and Post Office in Chicago was being razed. He purchased the 200,000 tons of salvage material for $20,000 and had it delivered to Milwaukee on 500 railroad flatcars, where parishioners were waiting to begin construction.

The basilica was formally dedicated in 1901 by Archbishop Francis Xavier Katzer with 4,000 people in attendance. Once completed, it met the needs of Milwaukee's growing Polish Catholic population by seating 2,400 members and was the city's largest church. Artist Tadeusz Żukotyński created the first painting in the church, The Martyrdom of St. Josaphat, in 1904. Decoration on the interior was completed in 1928 by artists Conrad Schmitt and Gonippo Raggi. Detailed oil paintings depicting biblical scenes adorned the walls and inner dome, while ornamental plasterwork finished in gold leaf set the columns, and ornate stained glass covered the windows.

In 1929, Pope Pius XI designated St. Josaphat Church as the third minor basilica in the United States, marking it as a place of pilgrimage, special devotion, and historical significance.

An electrical fire in 1940 caused extensive smoke damage to the interior, and a lightning storm in 1947 dislodged several large blocks of stone from the base of the dome. The need for repairs could no longer be ignored. Structural maintenance and renovation of the murals began in earnest from 1948 through 1951.

Strong winds in 1986 tore a sheet of copper from the dome and severe water damage occurred. A subsequent need for financial assistance was the impetus for partnerships with the Order of Friars Minor Conventual and several prominent businessmen from the Polish community. This led to the establishment of the St. Josaphat Basilica Foundation in 1991 and allowed large scale restoration work, again by Conrad Schmitt Studios, to begin.

== Architecture ==
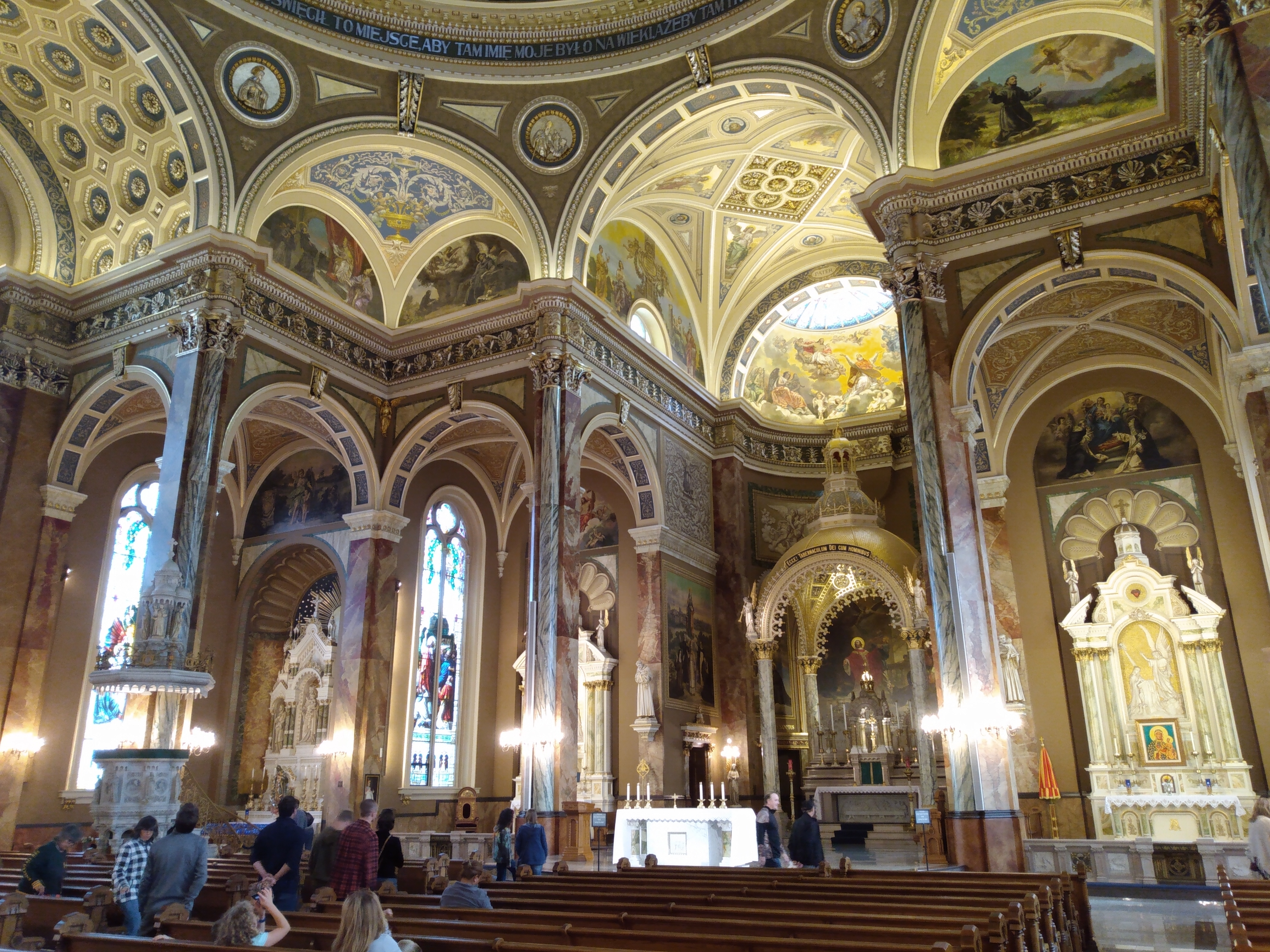
The inside of the Basilica of St. Josaphat in Milwaukee, Wisconsin on September 25, 2022.

The original plans drawn by architect Erhard Brielmaier called for brick construction. When it was decided that salvage material from the demolished U.S. Custom House, Court House, and Post Office in Chicago was to be used, Erhard had to redesign to incorporate stone as the primary building material.

Each block was measured and numbered for a best fit in the new design and hardly any stone was re-cut or went to waste. A large field nearby was used for material storage and sorting as it came off the railroad flatcars.

Six large granite columns from the Chicago building, along with their carved stone capitals, were added to the plans. The original ornamental bronze railings, lighting fixtures, and doors were also used.

Before construction could begin, a broad hill standing 30 feet (9.1 m) tall needed to be leveled. This task was completed using man and horse power, hauling earth to the western shore of the Kinnickinnic River.

The cornerstone was placed on July 4, 1897. Unskilled parishioners did most of the work under Erhard's guidance. Hired help from among the poor also contributed, when church funds allowed.

Since domestic Portland cement was of unknown quality at the time, German Dyckerhoff cement was imported for the foundation, while old railroad ties served as reinforcement. Heavy steel rails were also used in the concrete footings for the eight piers that supported the 214 ft (65 m) dome.

On July 21, 1901, a high mass presided over by Archbishop Francis Xavier Katzer marked the formal completion and dedication of the basilica.

== Interior decoration ==
The first mural for the church, The Martyrdom of St. Josaphat, was painted in 1904 by Tadeusz Żukotyński; it is directly behind and above the altar. Most of the other murals were painted by Gonippo Raggi. The basilica's stained glass windows were imported from Austria in 1902. Conrad Schmitt Studios later restored the interior of the basilica to its 1926 decorative grandeur.

== See also ==
- List of churches in the Roman Catholic Archdiocese of Milwaukee
- Lincoln Village, Milwaukee
- Polish Cathedral style
- Wacław Kruszka
- Tadeusz Żukotyński
- List of tallest buildings in Milwaukee
