= Thomasita Fessler =

American painter (1912–2005)

Mary Thomasita Fessler (February 23, 1912 – April 1, 2005) was an American painter and religious sister. Her work consisted of paintings, sculptures, and designs for stained-glass windows.

== History ==
Fessler was born Majella Nicola Fessler in Milwaukee, Wisconsin, the granddaughter of the architect Erhard Brielmaier. She joined the Sisters of St. Francis when she was 17 years old and went on to graduate from University of Wisconsin–Milwaukee and the School of the Art Institute of Chicago.

Fessler founded the Art Department at Cardinal Stritch College, becoming the chair of the Art Department and founding the Studio San Damiano art gallery and studio for artists and education, which were based on her philosophy of, "Nature is God's art and art is man's nature", as well as the Brielmaier tradition of, "A child who learns to create will not destroy."

Fessler created over 600 paintings, most of which are now held in private collections, some within art galleries or museums such as the Haggerty Museum at Marquette University. Two of her large sculptures made of precious woods are featured on the second and fourth floor walls of the Marquette University library. Her hand-carved 16-foot crucifix, altar sculptures, or stone carvings are found in churches throughout the United States. Her Studio San Damiano, where she worked for decades with artist Irene Kilmurry, closed on April 14, 2004. American Catholic composer, Dan Schutte was a student and participated in the 1964 New York World's Fair where Fessler arranged an exhibition with her students at the Vatican Pavilion. Some of Schutte's best known music collections feature Fessler paintings as cover art.

== Awards ==
Fessler's Franciscan vows of poverty and humility prevented her from having a publicist or agent, yet she still was listed in Who's Who of American Artists, Who's Who of Women, and named as one of the 100 Most Distinguished Women of Wisconsin. She was the first woman inducted into the Wisconsin Architects' Association. She received an Honorary Doctor of Fine Arts degree from Marquette University in 1976
