= Kluczynski Federal Building =

Office skyscraper in Chicago, Illinois

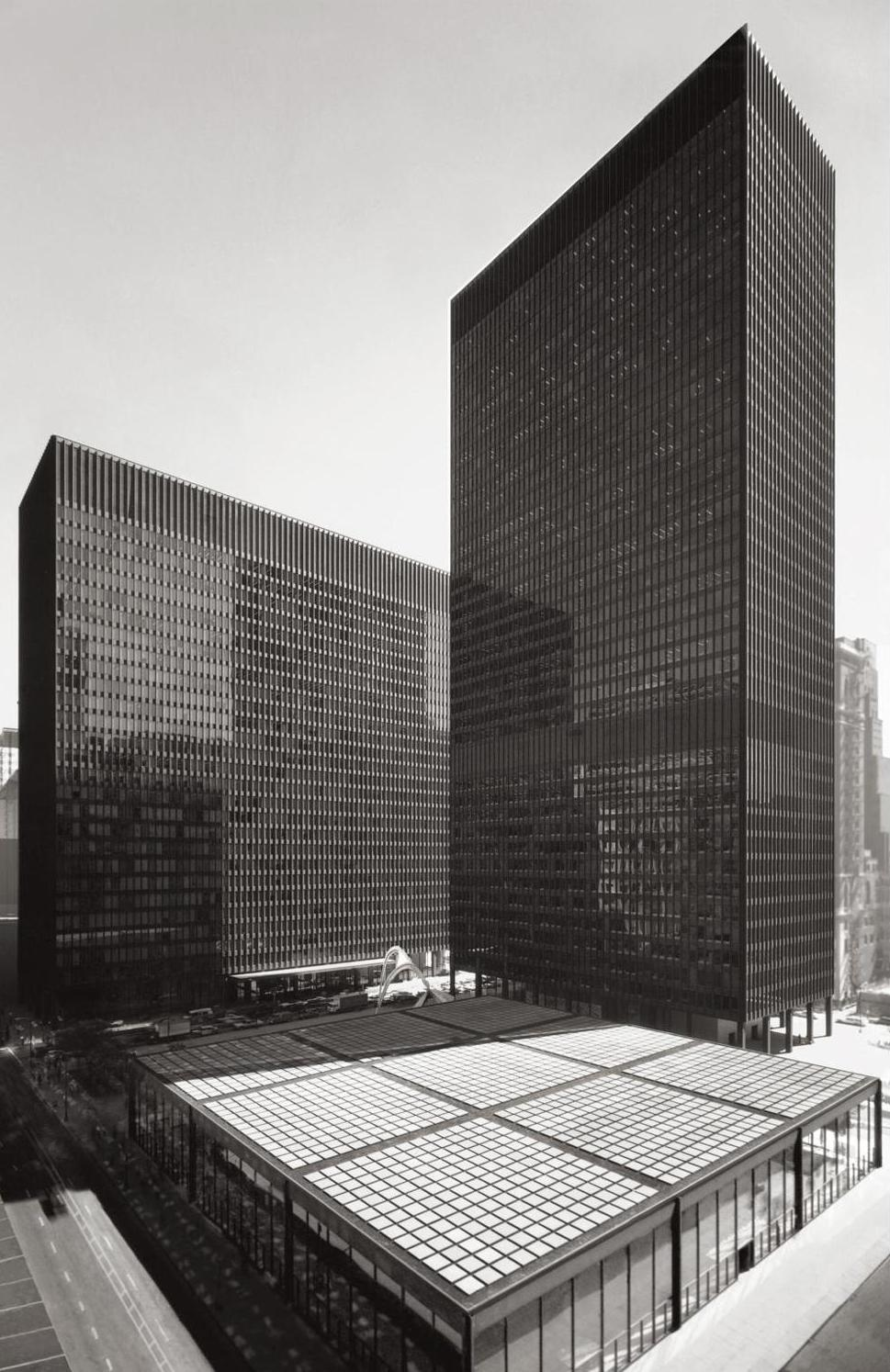
- The Chicago Federal Center designed by Mies van der Rohe includes the John C. Kluczynski Federal Building, at right.
- Interactive map of the Kluczynski Federal Building area

General information
- Type: government offices and courts
- Location: 230 South Dearborn Street; Chicago, Illinois 60603
- Coordinates: 41.8784°N 87.6299°W
- Construction started: 1960
- Completed: 1974
- Owner: General Services Administration

Height
- Architectural: International Style
- Roof: 562 ft (171 m)

Technical details
- Floor count: 1 to 42
- Floor area: 1,135,743 sq ft (105,514.0 m^{2})

Design and construction
- Architects: Ludwig Mies van der Rohe, Schmidt, Garden and Erikson; C. F. Murphy Associates; A. Epstein and Sons

The John C. Kluczynski Federal Building is a skyscraper in the downtown Chicago Loop located at 230 South Dearborn Street. The 45-story structure was designed by Ludwig Mies van der Rohe and completed in 1974 as the last portion of the new Federal Center. It is 562 feet (171 m) tall and with the Mies designed post office and plaza stands on the site previously occupied by the Chicago Federal Building by the architect Henry Ives Cobb. It was named in honor of U.S. Congressman John C. Kluczynski, who represented Illinois's 5th congressional district from 1951 to 1975 after his death in office. This is one of three buildings by Mies in the Federal Center Plaza complex: the others are the Loop Station Post Office and the Everett McKinley Dirksen United States Courthouse.

== Design ==
The John C. Kluczynski Building is constructed of a steel frame and contains 1,200,000 sq ft (110,000 m^{2}) of space. The exterior is sheathed in bronze-tinted glass set into bright aluminum frames. Beneath the windows are steel spandrel panels painted flat black and windows are separated horizontally by steel mullions of projecting steel I-beams also painted black. The two-story lobby is recessed allowing for a colonnade or pilotis to encircle the building at street level. The interior walls and floors of the lobby are covered in granite which extends to the plaza. The lobby contains several commemorative tablets which were removed from the previous building.

The entire complex is based on a 28 ft (8.5 m) grid pattern so that seams of the granite pavers in the plaza extend into the building lobbies and up the sides to create unity among the three structures. The center is similar to Mies' earlier Toronto-Dominion Centre and was expanded in 1991 with the addition of the 28-story Metcalfe Federal Building to the south across Jackson Boulevard.

== History ==
On August 28, 1996, eleven people, including Chicago Seven member David Dellinger and Abbie Hoffman's son Andrew, were arrested while demonstrating during the 1996 Democratic National Convention (occurring nearby) at the building.

Following his election as president on November 4, 2008, Barack Obama established his administration's transitional offices in the federal building, prompting heightened security measures in the surrounding area.

In 2009, the General Services Administration (GSA) undertook a major project to improve energy efficiency which included solar film on windows, LED lighting, upgraded HVAC and other mechanical systems. After the work, the building received a LEED Silver certification.

== Features ==
Alexander Calder's sculpture Flamingo, a 53-foot (16 m) red steel sculpture, was unveiled on the plaza October 24, 1974. The sculpture was conserved and restored in 1998. The plaza is also the site of a weekly farmers' market during the spring and summer seasons, open to the community.

== Tenants ==
Federal agencies in the building include the Air Force Recruiting Service, the Department of State Passport Agency, Department of Labor, Internal Revenue Service, Office of Personnel Management, Consumer Product Safety Commission, General Services Administration and offices for both the U.S. senators from Illinois, Richard "Dick" Durbin and Tammy Duckworth.

== Position in Chicago's skyline ==
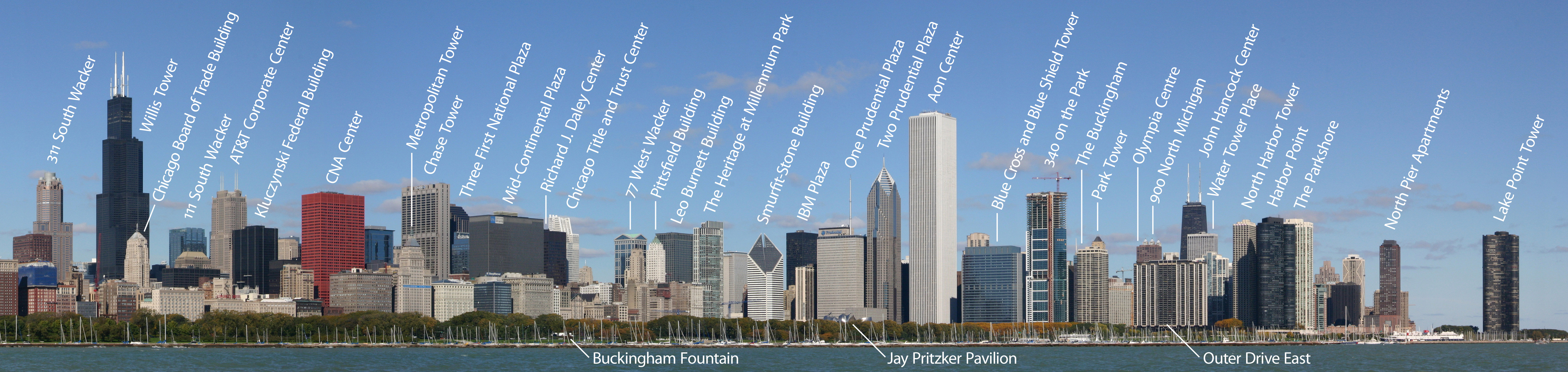

== See also ==
- Chicago architecture
