= Everett McKinley Dirksen United States Courthouse =

Skyscraper in Chicago, Illinois

Coordinates: 41.8788°N 87.6290°W

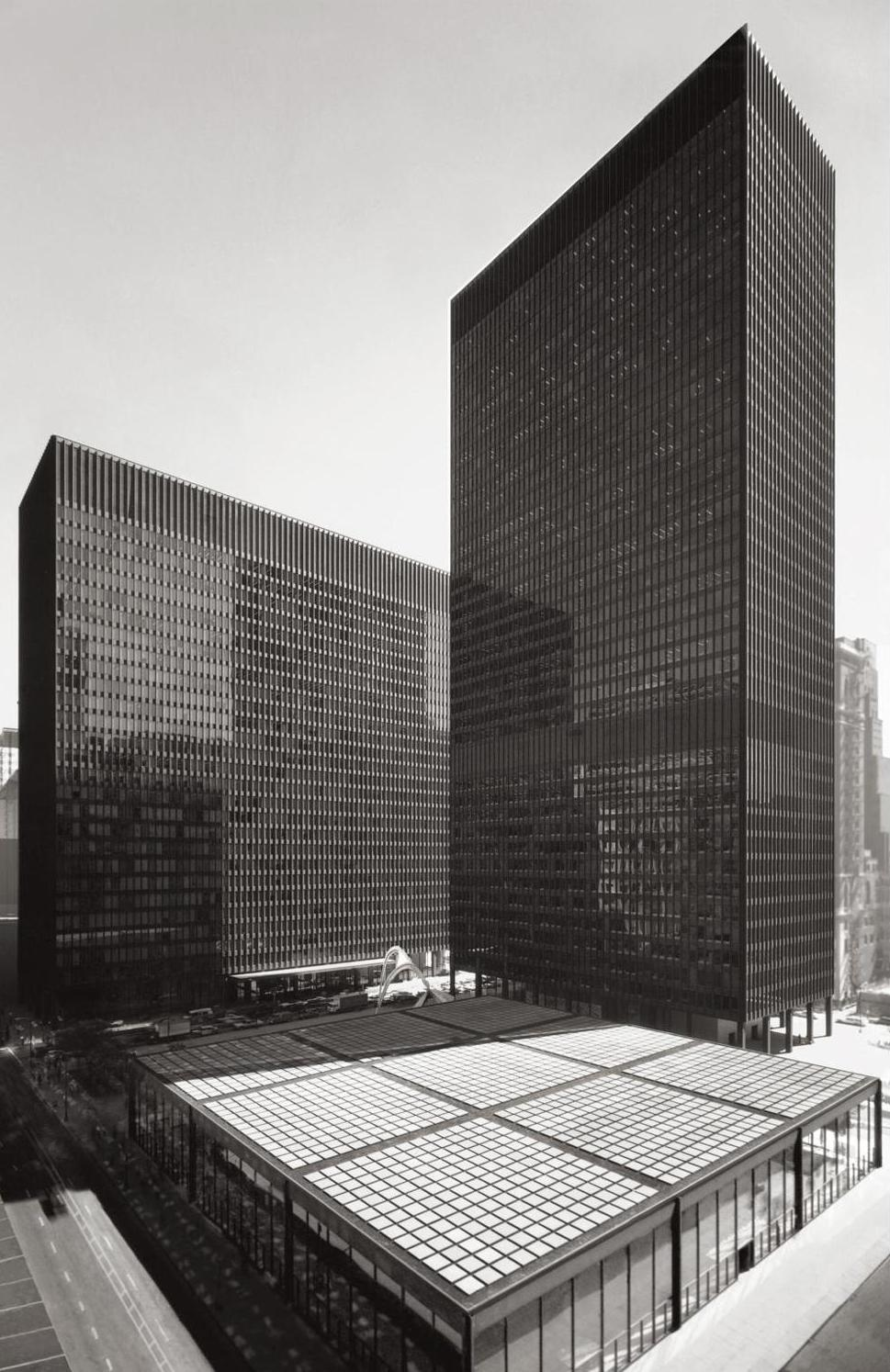
- The Chicago Federal Center designed by Mies van der Rohe, includes the Dirksen Courthouse, at left.
- Interactive map of the Everett McKinley Dirksen United States Courthouse area

General information
- Architectural style: international style
- Location: Chicago, Illinois, 219 South Dearborn Street, United States
- Current tenants: U.S. officials
- Construction started: 1960; 66 years ago
- Completed: 1964; 62 years ago
- Client: U.S. government

Height
- Height: 384 feet (117 m)

Technical details
- Floor count: 27 floors
- Floor area: 1.4 million gross square feet

Design and construction
- Architect: Ludwig Mies van der Rohe

The Everett McKinley Dirksen United States Courthouse, commonly referred to as the Dirksen Federal Building, is a skyscraper in the Chicago Loop at 219 South Dearborn Street. It was designed by Ludwig Mies van der Rohe and completed in 1964. The building is 384 feet (117 m) tall with 30 floors; it was named for U.S. Congressman Everett Dirksen.

The building houses the United States Court of Appeals for the Seventh Circuit, the United States District Court for the Northern District of Illinois, the United States Bankruptcy Court, the United States Marshal for the Northern District of Illinois, United States Attorney for the Northern District of Illinois, and local offices for various court-related federal agencies, such as the Federal Public Defender, United States Probation Service, United States Trustee, and National Labor Relations Board.

It is one of three buildings making up the modernist Chicago Federal Center complex designed by van der Rohe, along with Federal Plaza, the U.S. Post Office (Loop Station) and the Kluczynski Federal Building. Separate from the Federal Plaza, but opposite the Kluczynski Building across Jackson Boulevard, is the Metcalfe Federal Building.

== History ==
In 1960, Congress authorized the U.S. General Services Administration to construct a new office complex in Chicago's Loop District. The Federal Center consolidated over thirty agencies formerly scattered throughout the city in substandard leased space. Four Chicago architectural firms joined forces for the commission. The world-renowned architect Ludwig Mies van der Rohe served as the chief designer with Schmidt, Garden and Erikson; C. F. Murphy Associates; and A. Epstein and Sons all working on the project.

The original plan for the Chicago Federal Center called for two towers, the first to house federal agencies including the U.S. Department of the Treasury and U.S. Department of Defense, and the second for the courts, U.S. Department of Justice, and U.S. Postal Service. However, vehicular access for the post office required a street-level loading dock that would have intruded on the openness of the plaza between the two buildings. Upon further study, Mies designed a separate post office building with its own, below-grade vehicular access. The site for the new Federal Center included the block occupied by the Beaux-Arts style U.S. Post Office and Courthouse (1898–1905) designed by Henry Ives Cobb, which replaced an 1879 government building in the same location. It was in Cobb's domed building where Al Capone was tried for tax evasion in 1931.

The Palmer House hotel garage, Majestic hotel, and the Great Northern Office building were demolished in 1961. Tenants occupied the new U.S. Courthouse, the first of the complex's three buildings to be completed, in 1964. The government began demolition of the old post office in 1965 to clear the site for the two remaining buildings. The Loop Station Post Office and new Federal Building were completed in 1973 and 1974 respectively. The courthouse was renamed for Everett Dirksen to honor the longtime Illinois Senator after his death in 1969. The Federal Building was renamed in 1975 to honor John C. Kluczynski, U.S. Representative from Illinois from 1951 until his death in 1975.

The Post Office remains unnamed for an individual, but features a large bust and monument to 19th century Chicago Post Office manager George B. Armstrong, the founder and original superintendent of the Railway Mail Service.

== Architecture ==
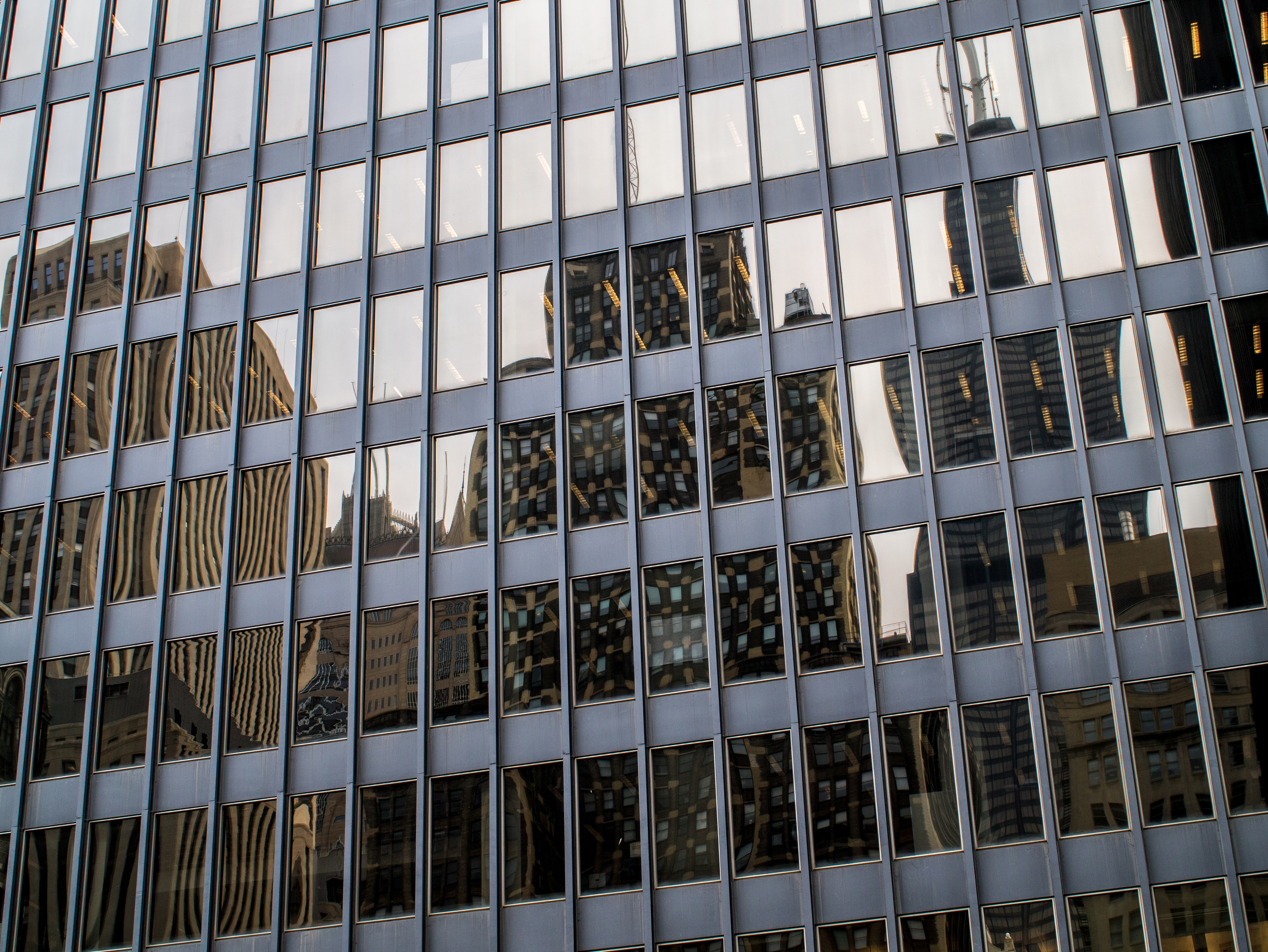
Dirksen Building detail

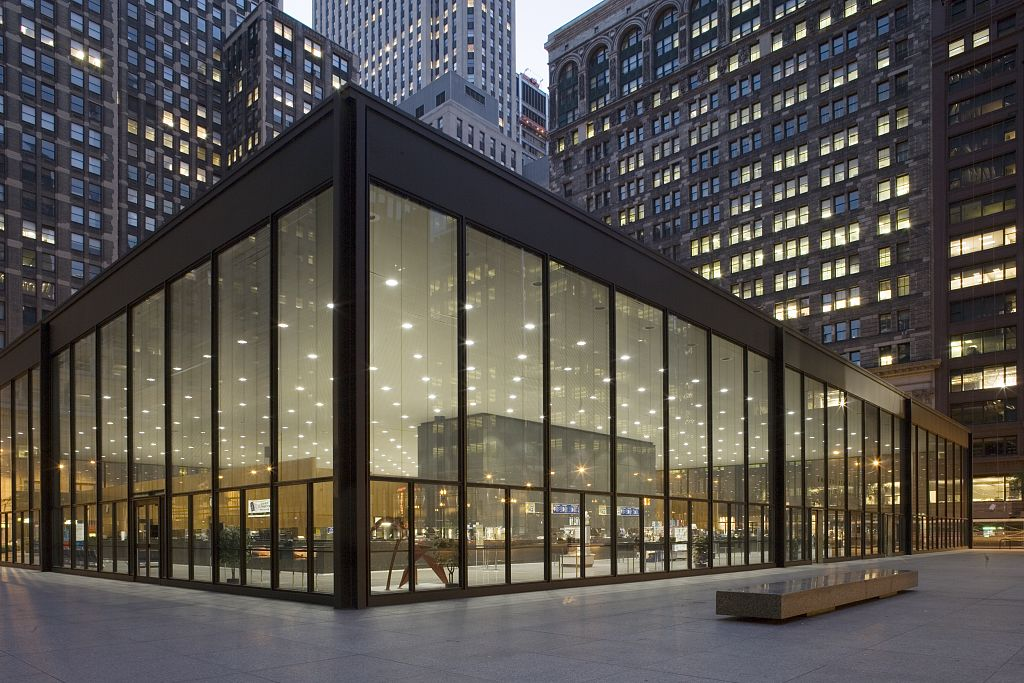
US Post Office Loop Station at the Dirksen Building. Photo by Carol M. Highsmith

The Federal Center extends over two blocks; a one-block site, bounded by Jackson, Clark, Adams, and Dearborn streets, contains the John C. Kluczynski Federal Building and U.S. Post Office Loop Station, while a parcel on an adjacent block to the east contains the courthouse. A glass-enclosed great hall, 100 feet (30 m) wide and 25 feet (7.6 m) high, spans the center of the courthouse, serving as a visual gateway through the complex. From State Street on the east, one can look west down Quincy Street, through the courthouse, across Dearborn Street to the central plaza and post office beyond.

To its northwest is the freestanding Loop Station post office, which is one story with two workroom levels below grade. Directly across the street from the Kluczynski building is the thirty-story Everett M. Dirksen U.S. Courthouse. The courthouse contains 1.4 million gross square feet of space and is set at a right angle to the Federal Building high-rise across Dearborn Street. The Dirksen courthouse was designed with fifteen, two-story courtrooms located on the top ten stories of the building. Courtrooms were located away from the curtain walls to reduce audio and visual distractions. The simple but elegant book-matched black-walnut paneling and molded-plywood spectator benches are lit by ceiling fixtures covered with an aluminum grid. During the 1990s, additional courtrooms were created within the building in a style complementing the original details; Mies's initial design planned for future expansion of this nature.

The simple and well-proportioned steel-and-glass design of the Chicago Federal Center epitomizes the minimalist architectural approach favored by architect Ludwig Mies van der Rohe. The structural framing of the buildings is formed of high-tensile bolted steel and concrete. The exterior curtain walls are defined by projecting steel I-beam mullions covered with flat black graphite paint, characteristic of Mies's designs. The balance of the curtain walls are of bronze-tinted glass panes, framed in shiny aluminum, and separated by steel spandrels, also covered with flat black graphite paint. This organization emphasizes the impressive height of the sleek towers. Franz Schulze, a scholar of Mies's work, has praised "Mies's uncompromising devotion to principle, together with his vaunted sensitivity to proportion and structural detail and the organizational scale, [that] combine to give the complex a monumental urban presence." The entire complex is organized on a 28-foot grid pattern subdivided into six 4-foot, 8-inch modules. This pattern extends from the granite-paved plaza into the ground-floor lobbies of the two towers, where the floors and elevator lobby walls are also granite. The lines of the grid continue vertically up the buildings, integrating each component of the complex. The 42-story, John C. Kluczynski Federal Building is the tallest of the three buildings. Both the Kluczynski and Dirksen buildings are elevated on open colonnades, called pilotis, at the plaza level.

In the early 1970s, the U.S. General Services Administration, under its Art in Architecture program, commissioned a steel sculpture for the plaza from the celebrated artist Alexander Calder. His creation, entitled Flamingo, was unveiled on October 25, 1974. The 53-foot-tall steel stabile, with its bright red color and graceful curves, provides a striking contrast to the dark, angular steel and glass curtain walls of the Federal Center buildings. In 1998, the stabile was conserved and lighting was added.

In celebration of the 2018 Illinois Bicentennial, Chicago Federal Plaza was selected as one of the Illinois 200 Great Places by the American Institute of Architects Illinois component (AIA Illinois).

== Significant events ==
- 1960: Congress authorizes the construction of the Chicago Federal Center
- 1964: U.S. Courthouse completed
- 1965–1966: 1905 federal building demolished to allow for the construction of remaining two buildings
- 1973: U.S. Post Office Loop Station completed at Federal Center's northwest corner
- 1974: Federal Building completed; Flamingo stabile by Alexander Calder installed in plaza
- 1993–1999: Additional two-story courtrooms constructed within original structure of Dirksen U.S. Courthouse
- 2002: Installation of perimeter-security bollard system in response to increased security requirements for federal properties
- 2006: Exterior curtain wall repair and repainting of entire three structure complex with Miesian black paint
- 2012: Completion of full building modernization project, reducing building energy and water consumption by more than 40%

== Building facts ==
- Architects: Ludwig Mies van der Rohe; Schmidt, Garden and Erikson; C. F. Murphy Associates; A. Epstein and Sons
- Construction Dates: 1960–1964
- Location: Dearborn Street between Jackson Boulevard and Adams Street in downtown Chicago's central Loop
- Architectural Style: International Style
- Primary Materials: Steel and bronze-tinted glass; granite paving
- Prominent Features: Striking glass tower; Projecting steel I-beam mullions; Open colonnades at tower bases; Flamingo stabile

== See also ==
- Chicago architecture
- Toronto-Dominion Centre
