= Flamingo (sculpture) =

Sculpture in Chicago, Illinois, by Alexander Calder

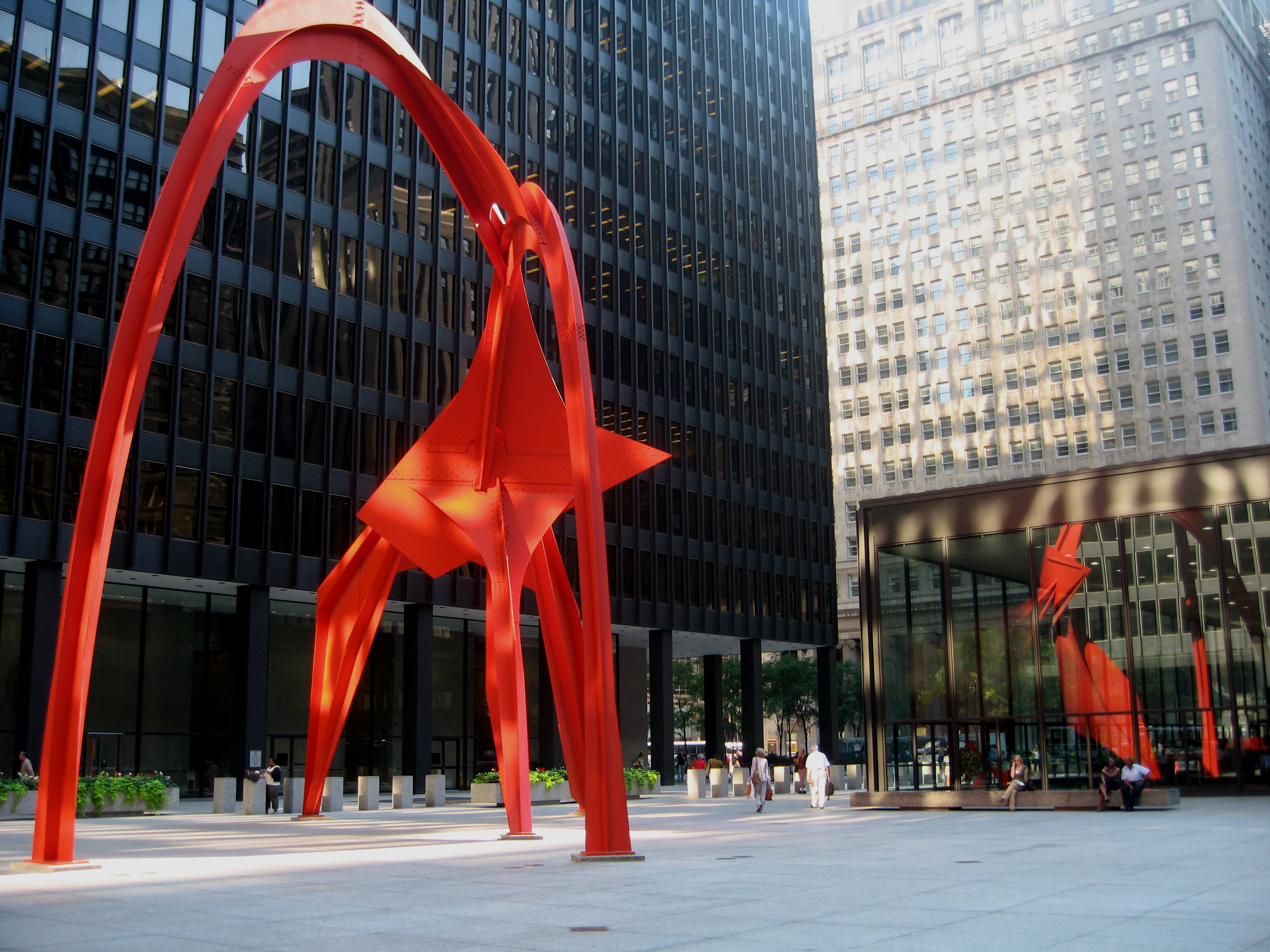
- Artist: Alexander Calder
- Year: October 25, 1974
- Type: painted steel stabile
- Dimensions: 1,620 cm (636 in)
- Location: Chicago; 41.87881°N 87.62967°W
- Owner: General Services Administration

Flamingo, a sculpture by American artist Alexander Calder, is a 53-foot-tall (16 m) stabile located in the Federal Plaza in front of the Kluczynski Federal Building in Chicago, Illinois, United States. It was commissioned by the United States General Services Administration and was unveiled in 1974, although Calder's signature on the sculpture indicates it was constructed in 1973.

== Attributes ==
Flamingo weighs 50 tons, is composed of steel, and is vermilion in color. Calder gave the stabile its color, which has come to be called "Calder red", to offset it from the black and steel surroundings of nearby office buildings, including the Ludwig Mies van der Rohe-designed Kluczynski Federal Building. The stabile is an art form which Calder pioneered. It is an abstract structure that is completely stationary, as opposed to a mobile, which can move with air currents. In 2012, the sculpture received a fresh paint job in its characteristic color.

== Commissioning and unveiling ==
Calder was commissioned to design the sculpture because of his well-established international reputation; the space, surrounded by rectangular modern buildings, necessitated the kind of arching forms and dynamic surfaces that a large-scale Calder stabile could provide. Flamingo was the first work of art commissioned by the General Services Administration under the federal Percent for Art program, which allocates a percentage of a project's budget to public art. Calder unveiled the model for Flamingo on April 23, 1973, at the Art Institute of Chicago; the sculpture was presented to the public for the first time on October 25, 1974, at the same time that Calder's Universe mobile was unveiled at the Sears Tower (now the Willis Tower). The day was proclaimed "Alexander Calder Day" and featured a circus parade.

== Spatial relationships ==
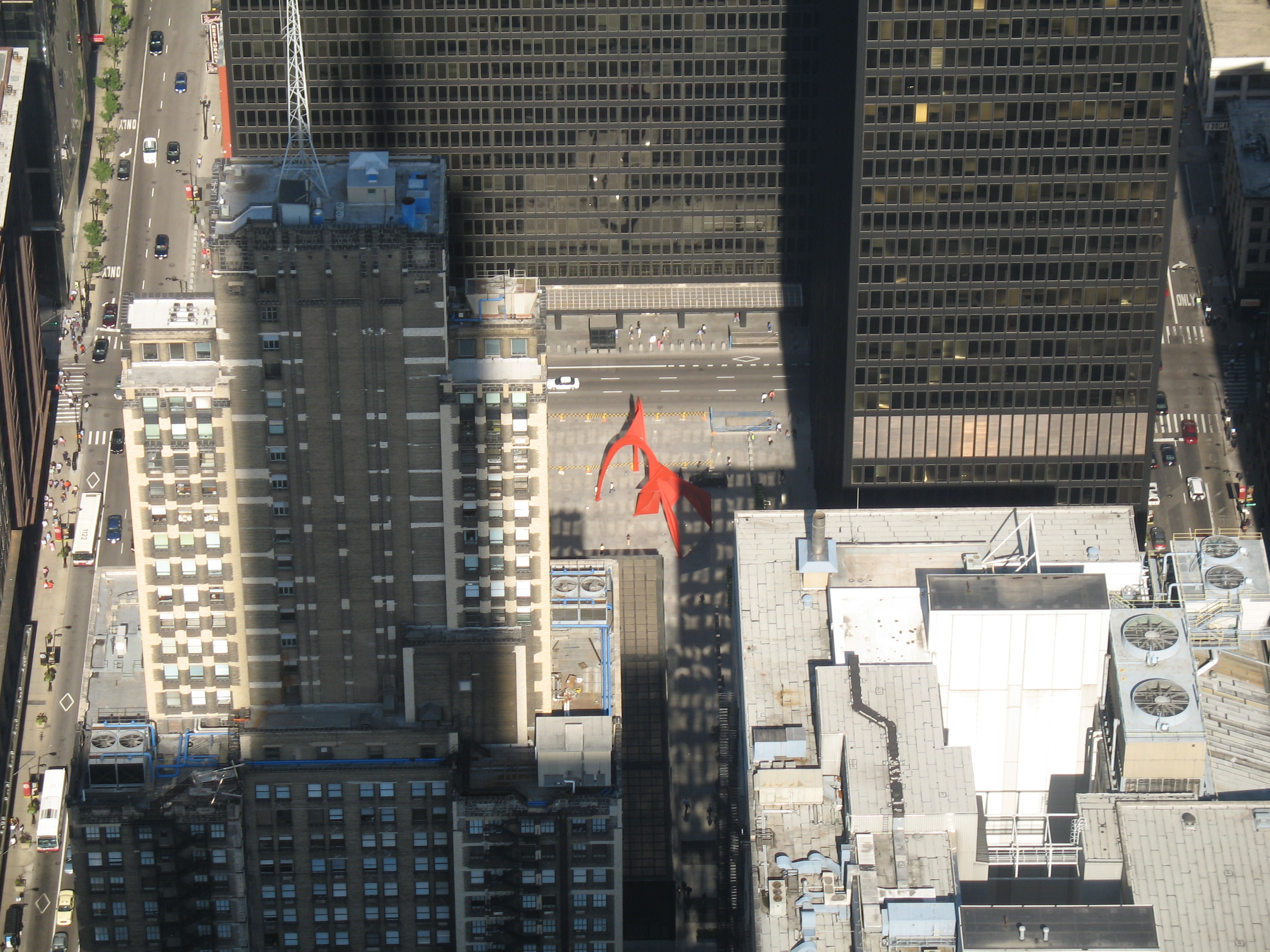
Flamingo as viewed from the Willis Tower skydeck

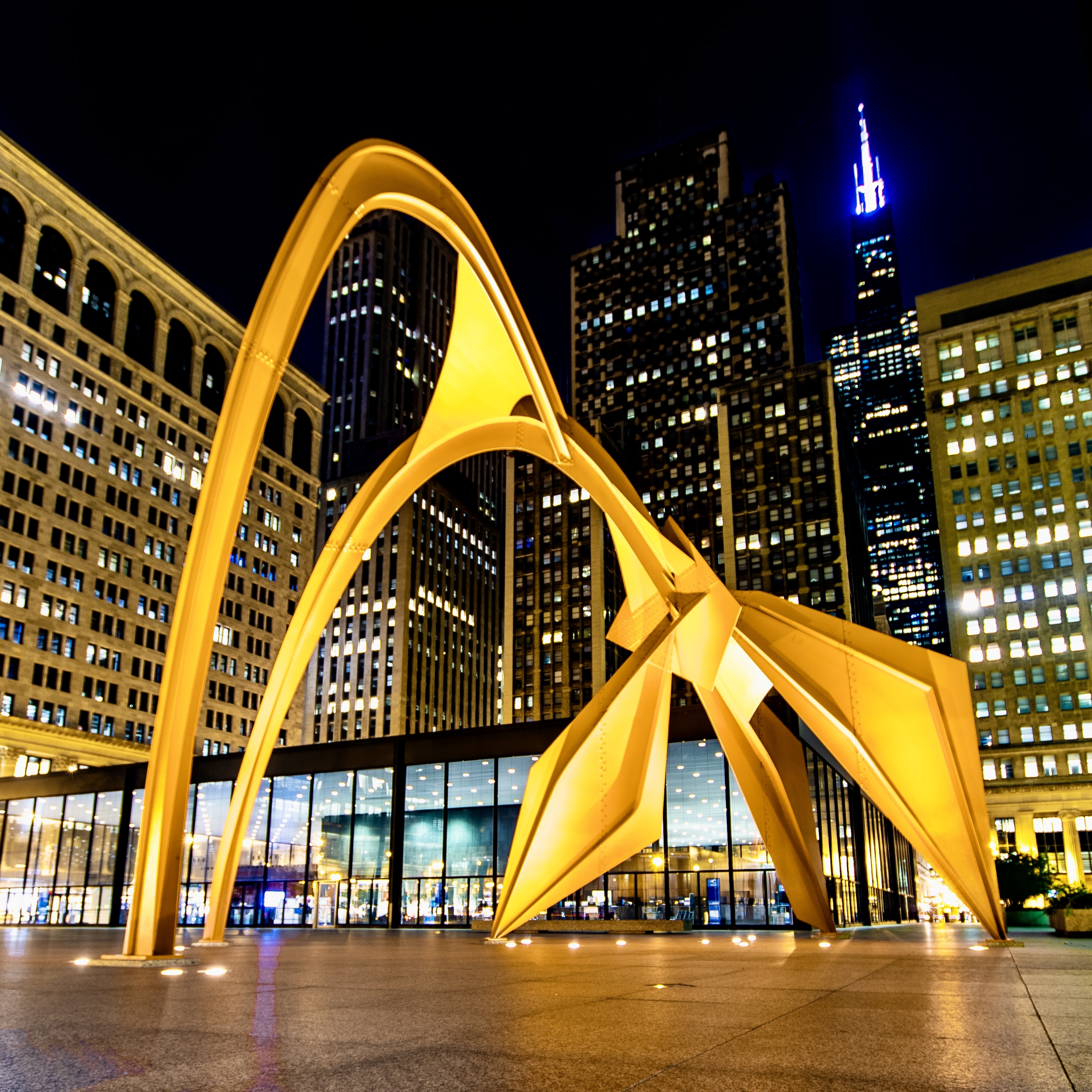
Flamingo sculpture in relation to the surrounding buildings.

Despite the massive size of the sculpture, its design is such that viewers can walk underneath and around it, thus enabling one to perceive it in human scale. The shape of Flamingo alludes to the natural and animal realm, which is a stark contrast to more literal interpretations in sculpture from previous decades.

Calder's structure is a prominent example of the constructivist movement, first popularized in Russia in the early 20th century. Constructivism refers to sculpture that is made from smaller pieces which are joined.

A maquette of the stabile was formerly displayed inside the Loop Station post office in the Federal Plaza. It currently resides in the Art Institute of Chicago's Modern Wing.

== See also ==
- List of Alexander Calder public works
- List of public art in Chicago
- Flying Dragon, a nearby Calder sculpture also utilizing the color Calder red
