= United States Custom House, Court House, and Post Office (Chicago, 1880) =

Federal government building from the 1870s to 1896

Coordinates: 41°52′43.5″N 87°37′48″W

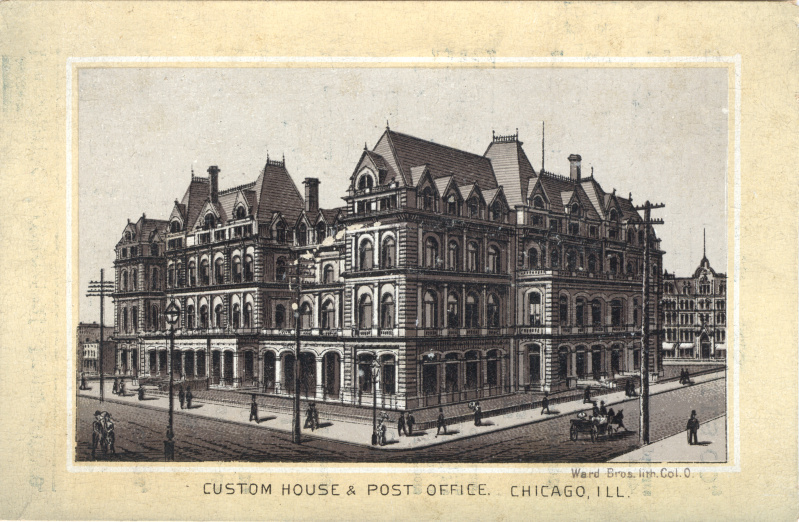
- Trade card, 1889
- Interactive map of the United States Custom House, Court House, and Post Office area

General information
- Location: Chicago
- Opened: 1880
- Demolished: 1896

Design and construction
- Architect: James G. Gill

The United States Custom House, Court House, and Post Office was a federal government building from the 1870s to 1896 in the block bounded by Adams Street, Jackson Boulevard, Dearborn Street, and Clark Street in the Chicago Loop

== History ==
The supervising architect was James G. Gill. It was completed in 1880, but already occupied by 1879.

Federal courts meeting in this building were the United States District Court for the Northern District of Illinois (1879 to 1894), the United States Circuit Court for the Northern District of Illinois (1879 to 1894), and the United States Court of Appeals for the Seventh Circuit from 1891 to 1894.

This federal building was poorly planned and poorly built, and by the 1890s was considered dangerous and too small. The building was razed in 1896, and its stone shipped by rail to Milwaukee, where it was used to build the Basilica of St. Josaphat. The Chicago Federal Building was then built on the same site, and for similar purposes, from 1898 and 1905.

== See also ==
- United States Customs House (Chicago) (1933)
