= La Grande Vitesse =

Sculpture by American artist Alexander Calder

Coordinates: 42.96937°N 85.67075°W

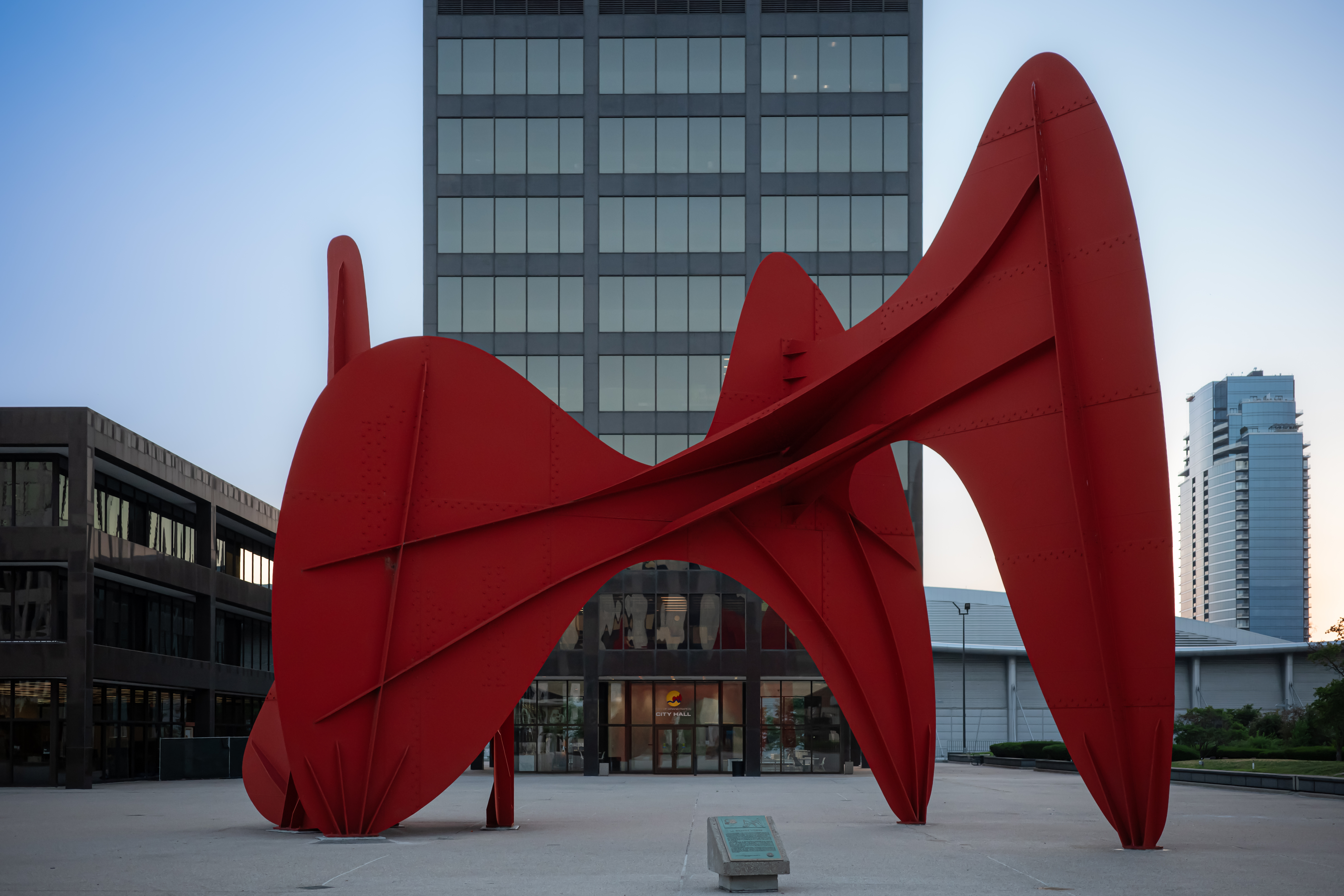
- Artist: Alexander Calder
- Year: 1969
- Type: Painted steel
- Dimensions: 13 m × 9.1 m × 16 m (43 ft × 30 ft × 54 ft)
- Location: Vandenberg Plaza; Grand Rapids, Michigan

La Grande Vitesse, a public sculpture by American artist Alexander Calder, is located on the large concrete plaza surrounding City Hall and the Kent County Building in Grand Rapids, Michigan, United States. Popularly referred to as simply "the Calder", since its installation in 1969 it has come to be a symbol of Grand Rapids, and an abstraction of it is included in the city's official logo.

The Calder logo used on the city flag and street signs

== History ==
The sculpture was the first public art work funded by the Art in Public Places program of the National Endowment for the Arts (NEA). Fabricated in Tours, France and assembled on the plaza, the steel sculpture is 43 feet tall, 54 feet long, and 30 feet wide, and weighs 42 tons. It is painted in Calder's signature bright red. The title is French for “the great swiftness" which is synonymous with and ultimately translated as "The Grand Rapids".

Calder's design for La Grande Vitesse was consistent with other monumental sculptures he was commissioned to create during this period in his career. He dubbed these works "stabiles", in contrast to his mobiles. The sculpture is a popular gathering place for residents and tourists alike, and it was the centerpiece of the city's annual Festival of the Arts, first held a year after its installation.

A panel of local officials and nationally recognized art experts selected Calder for the commission in 1967. After Calder was chosen and residents learned of his plans, a controversy ensued. Opponents wrote letters to the editor and created songs and cartoons deriding the sculpture, and advocates used the mayor's bully pulpit and public service television to call attention to Calder's credentials and vision. La Grande Vitesse was formally dedicated on June 14, 1969, and has since become a popular civic symbol.

== Construction ==
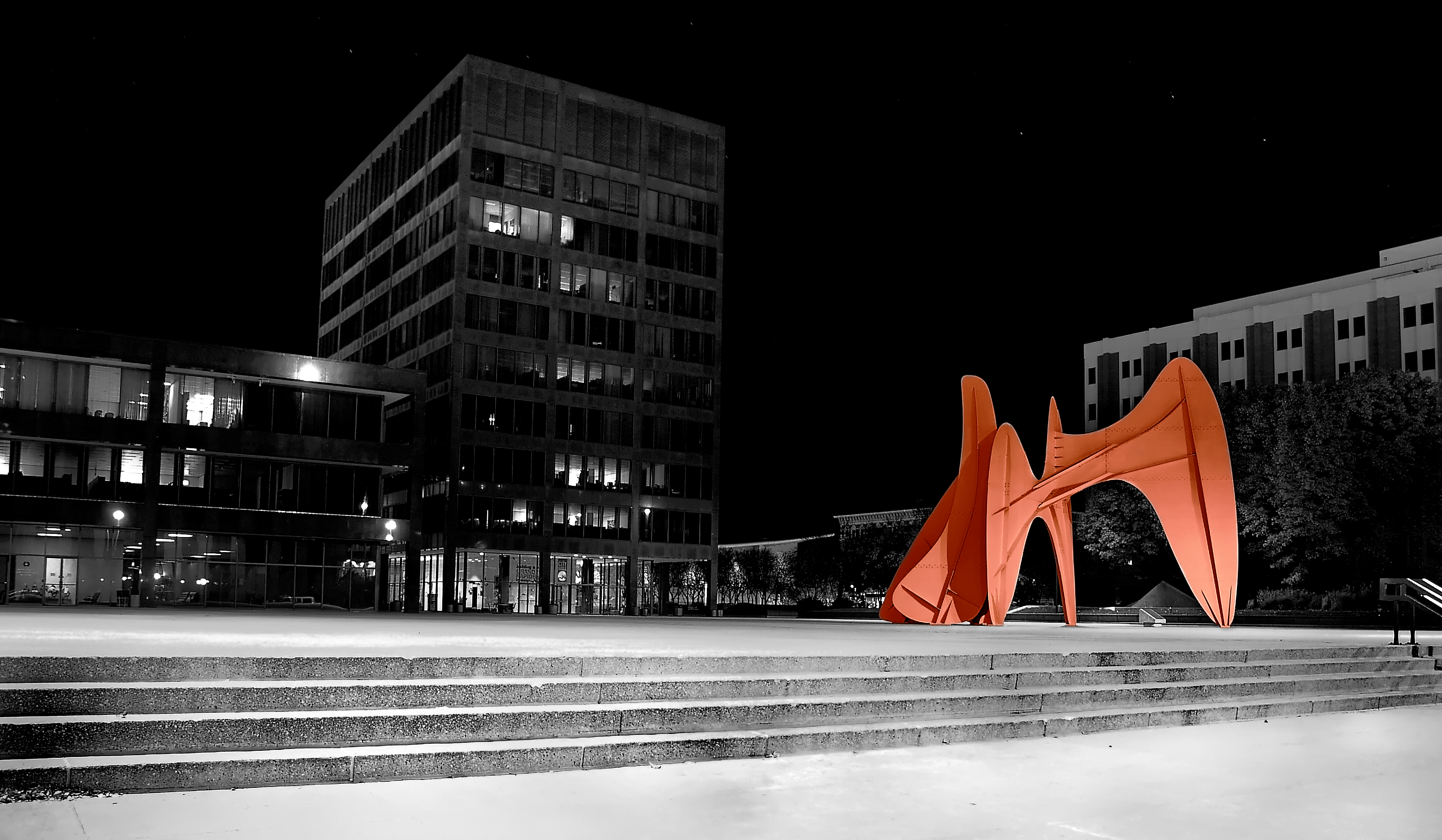
Alexander Calder's La Grande Vitesse

After receiving the architectural plans and specified materials for the development of the site, Calder completed an 8-foot maquette in 1968, and began fabrication at the Biémont foundry in Tours, France later that year. The work was shipped in 27 pieces, packed in wooden crates and assembled on-site over five days. According to project advocate Nancy Mulnix Tweddale, "It was all laid out like a jigsaw puzzle. It was fascinating for people to watch this big object grow before their very eyes. The sparks flew as the welders worked and then the vivid color was painted on. It was like outdoor theater."

The $128,000 cost of commissioning, fabricating, shipping, and installing the sculpture (equivalent to $900,000 in 2020) was shared by the NEA, local philanthropic foundations, area businesses, and individual citizens. The wife of former FDIC Chairman L. William Seidman, Sarah "Sally" Seidman, was described as "instrumental" in bringing the artwork to Grand Rapids.

There is a 1/23-sized model of La Grande Vitesse displayed and mounted near the base of the stabile itself, created with Calder's approval by the Keeler Brass Co. in 1976. It was donated by Mike and Mary Ann Keeler, original contributors in the acquisition of the huge sculpture, and created by the company Mike Keeler's grandfather and great uncles founded in the late 1800s so that blind visitors to the location could "see" the sculpture in its entirety.

=== Location ===
The Civic Center in which the sculpture is sited was designed by Chicago architectural firm Skidmore, Owings and Merrill. The site features two black, rectilinear, curtain-walled buildings for City Hall and Kent County, surrounded by a concrete plaza. The county building, which is shorter with a larger footprint, features an enlarged reproduction of a Calder painting on its roof. The construction and sculpture projects were part of a downtown urban renewal effort. The area is formally named Vandenberg Plaza, after Senator Arthur Vandenberg, but is popularly referred to as Calder Plaza.

== See also ==
- Artists of other major public artworks in Grand Rapids
  - Paul Collins
  - Mark di Suvero
  - Maya Lin
  - Robert Morris (artist)
- List of Alexander Calder public works
  - Mercury Fountain
  - Gwenfritz 1968
  - Eagle 1971
  - Flamingo 1973
  - Cheval Rouge 1974
  - Mountains and Clouds 1986
