= List of Alexander Calder public works =

This is a list of artworks by Alexander Calder that are available to the public.

== United States ==
=== California ===
- The Hawk for Peace, 1968, Berkeley Art Museum and Pacific Film Archive, University of California, Berkeley
- Bucephalus, 1963, Saroyan Theatre, Fresno
- Three Quintains, 1964, Los Angeles County Museum of Art
- Four Arches, 1973, 333 S. Hope Street, Bunker Hill, Los Angeles
- Spinal Column, 1968, San Diego Museum of Art
- Le Faucon (The Falcon), 1963, Stanford University, Palo Alto
- Button Flower, 1959, University of California, Los Angeles
- Big Crinkly, 1969, San Francisco Museum of Modern Art
- Jerusalem Stabile, 1967, On loan to the Huntington Library, Art Collections and Botanical Gardens, San Marino
- Spiny Top, Curly Bottom, 1963, J. Paul Getty Museum, Los Angeles
- The Jousters, 1963, J. Paul Getty Museum, Los Angeles

=== Connecticut ===
- Stegosaurus, 1973, Alfred E. Burr Mall, Hartford
- Gallows and Lollipops, 1960, Yale University Art Gallery, New Haven
- Mountains, 1976, Minor Library, Roxbury

=== Illinois ===
- Flamingo, 1974, Federal Center Plaza, Chicago
- Flying Dragon, 1975, Sculpture Garden, Art Institute of Chicago
- Le Baron, 1965, Northern Illinois University, De Kalb

=== Indiana ===
- Peau Rouge Indiana, 1970, Musical Arts Center, Indiana University Bloomington

=== Iowa ===
- Black Spread, 1951, Des Moines Art Center,
- Holy Red, 1960, Des Moines Art Center,

=== Kentucky ===
- The Red Feather, 1975, The Kentucky Center, Louisville

=== Maryland ===
- Four Dishes, 1967, Baltimore Museum of Art
- The 100 Yard Dash, 1969, Baltimore Museum of Art

=== Massachusetts ===
- La Grande Voile (The Big Sail), 1965, MIT, Cambridge
- La Grande Voile (The Big Sail), intermediate maquette, 1965, List Visual Arts Center, MIT, Cambridge
- Onion 1965, Harvard Yard, Harvard, Cambridge

=== Michigan ===
- Jeune fille et sa suite (Young Woman and Her Suitors), 1970, Detroit Institute of Arts
- The X and Its Tails, 1967, College of Creative Studies, Detroit
- Deux Disques (Two Discs), 1965, Frederik Meijer Gardens & Sculpture Park (Long-term loan from Smithsonian Institution), Grand Rapids
- A Two-Faced Guy, 1969, Frederik Meijer Gardens & Sculpture Park (Long-term loan from Smithsonian Institution), Grand Rapids
- La Grande Vitesse, 1969, Vandenberg Plaza, Grand Rapids
- Rooftop painting, Kent County Administration Building, Grand Rapids
- La Grande vitesse [intermediate maquette], 1969, Grand Rapids Art Museum
- 4 Planes in Space, c. 1955, Grand Rapids Art Museum
- Mobile 1, 1953 Grosse Pointe Public Library, Grosse Pointe Farms

=== Minnesota ===
- The Spinner, 1966, Walker Art Center, Minneapolis
- Octopus, 1964, Walker Art Center, Minneapolis
- Red, Yellow, White, 1961, Minneapolis Central Library
- Ahab, 1953, Minneapolis Institute of Art

=== Missouri ===
- Shiva, 1965, Crown Center, Kansas City
- Tom's Cubicle, 1967, Nelson-Atkins Museum of Art, Kansas City
- Five Rudders, 1965, Mildred Lane Kemper Art Museum, Washington University in St. Louis
- Le Bonnet phrygien, 1963, Saint Louis Art Museum, St. Louis

=== New Jersey ===
- Hard to Swallow, 1966, S.C. Williams Library, Stevens Institute of Technology, Hoboken
- The Stevens Mobile, 1970, S.C. Williams Library, Stevens Institute of Technology, Hoboken
- Five Discs, One Empty, 1970, Princeton University Art Museum
- El Sol Rojo, intermediate maquette, 1968, The New Jersey State Museum, Trenton

=== New York ===
- Triangles and Arches, 1965, Empire State Plaza, Albany
- The Arch, 1975, Storm King Art Center, Mountainville
- Janey Waney, 1969, Gramercy Park, New York City (formerly on display at Smith Haven Mall, Lake Grove, New York)
- Object in Five Planes, 1965, Federal Plaza, New York City
- .125, 1957, International Terminal 4, John F. Kennedy International Airport, New York City
- Le Guichet (The Ticket Window), 1963, Lincoln Center for the Performing Arts, New York City
- Saurien, 1975, IBM building, New York City
- Man-Eater with Pennants, mobile, 1945, Sculpture Garden at Museum of Modern Art, New York City
- Black Widow, stabile, 1959, Sculpture Garden at Museum of Modern Art, New York City
- Sandy's Butterfly, stabile/mobile, 1964, Sculpture Garden at Museum of Modern Art, New York City
- Whale II, 1964 (1937), Sculpture Garden at Museum of Modern Art, New York City
- Sidewalk Design, 1970, 1014–1018 Madison Avenue, New York City
- World Trade Center Stabile (Bent Propeller), [destroyed in the terrorist attacks of September 11, 2001] 1970–71, 7 World Trade Center, New York City
- Large Spiny, 1966, Pocantico Hills Estate, Tarrytown
- Hats Off, 1969, Donald M. Kendall Sculpture Gardens at PepsiCo, Purchase
- Three Arches, 1963, Munson-Williams-Proctor Institute, Museum of Art, Utica

=== Ohio ===
- Intermediate Model for the Arch, 1975, sculpture garden at the Columbus Museum of Art
- Stegosaurus, intermediate maquette, 1972–1973, entrance of Toledo Museum of Art
- Twenty Leaves and an Apple, 1948, a mobile installed in the lobby of the Terrace Plaza Hotel, currently in the Cincinnati Art Museum

=== Oklahoma ===
- Caracas, 1955, third floor, Oklahoma City Museum of Art, Oklahoma City

=== Pennsylvania ===
- Mobile, 1941, The Carnegie Museum of Art, Pittsburgh
- Jerusalem Stabile, intermediate maquette, Meyerson Hall, University of Pennsylvania, Philadelphia
- The Ghost, 1964, Philadelphia Museum of Art
- White Cascade, 1975, Federal Reserve Bank of Philadelphia
- Three Discs, One Lacking, 1968, Pennwalt/Levy Park, Philadelphia
- Pittsburgh, Pennsylvania|Pittsburgh, 1958, Pittsburgh International Airport
- Back from Rio, 1959, in front of the Science Center, Swarthmore College, Swarthmore
- Yellow and Red with White Dots, 1965, Palmer Museum of Art, State College

=== Tennessee ===
- Pregnant Whale, 1963, in front of the Hunter Museum of American Art, Chattanooga
- Nenuphar (Water Lily), 1968, Memphis Brooks Museum of Art, Memphis

=== Texas ===
- Three Bollards (Trois Bollards), 1970, Nasher Sculpture Center, Dallas
- The Crab, 1962, Museum of Fine Arts, Houston
- International Mobile, 1949, Museum of Fine Arts, Houston

=== Washington ===
- Eagle, 1971, Olympic Sculpture Park, Seattle

=== Washington, D.C. ===
- Finny Fish, 1948, National Gallery of Art
- Cascading Flowers, mobile, 1949, National Gallery of Art
- Aztec Josephine Baker, 1929, National Gallery of Art
- Mountains and Clouds, 1976–87, Hart Senate Office Building
- Six Dots Over a Mountain, 1956, Hirshhorn Museum and Sculpture Garden, Smithsonian Institution
- Deux Disques (Two Discs), 1965, Hirshhorn Museum and Sculpture Garden, Smithsonian Institution, On loan to the Frederik Meijer Gardens in Grand Rapids, Michigan
- Untitled, mobile, 1976, National Gallery of Art
- Tom's, stabile, 1974, National Gallery of Art
- Cheval Rouge (Red Horse), 1974, National Gallery of Art Sculpture Garden
- Two Faced Guy, 1969, The Phillips Collection
- Gwenfritz, 1968, National Museum of American Art

=== Wisconsin ===
- Red, Black, and Blue, 1968, Milwaukee Art Museum

== Outside the United States ==
=== Australia ===
- Bobine, 1970, National Gallery of Australia, Canberra
- Crossed Blades, 1967, Australia Square Tower, Sydney

=== Belgium ===
- The Dog, stabile, 1958, Middelheim Open Air Sculpture Museum, Antwerp
- The Whirling Ear, stabile/mobile, 1957, Royal Museums of Fine Arts of Belgium, Brussels

=== Canada ===
- Trois disques (three disks), also known by the title "Man", 1967, the island of Saint Helen, Jean-Drapeau Park, Montreal
- Man (intermediate maquette), 1967, York University Art Gallery, Toronto

=== Denmark ===
- Nervures Minces (Slender Ribs), stabile, 1963, Sculpture Garden, Louisiana Museum of Modern Art, Humlebæk
- Little Janey Waney, stabile/mobile, 1976 (1964), Sculpture Garden, Louisiana Museum of Modern Art, Humlebæk
- Almost Snow Plow, stabile, 1976 (1964), Sculpture Garden, Louisiana Museum of Modern Art, Humlebæk

=== France ===
- Crinkly, 1969, Corner of Rue du Clos des Gardes and Rue du 8 Mai 1945, Amboise
- Caliban, 1964, Musee Esteve, Bourges
- Monsieur Loyal (Mr. Loyal), 1967, Sculpture Park, Museum of Grenoble
- Trois pics (Three Peaks), 1967, Nouvelle Gare (Train Station), Grenoble
- La Cornue, 1974, Academie de Grenoble
- Small Crinkly, 1976, Château La Coste, Le Puy-Sainte-Réparade
- Théâtre de Nice, 1970, Theatre National de Nice
- L'araignée rouge (The Red Spider), 1976, Etablissement Public pour L'Aménagement de la Région de La Défense, Paris
- Nageoire (Fin), 1964, Musée National d'Art Moderne, Centre Pompidou, Paris
- Horizontal, 1974, Musée National d'Art Moderne, Centre Pompidou, Paris
- La Spirale, 1958, UNESCO building, Paris
- Les ailes brisées (The Broken Wings), 1967, Saint Exupery College, Perpignan
- Totem-Saché, 1974, In front of the church, Saché, Indre-et-Loire
- Les trois ailes (The Three Wings), 1963, Musée d'art Moderne, Saint-Etienne
- Les Renforts (The Reinforcements), 1963, Fondation Maeght, Saint-Paul-de-Vence
- Empennage (Airplane Tail), 1953, Fondation Maeght, Saint-Paul-de-Vence
- Guillotine pour huit (Guillotine for Eight), stabile,1963, Lille Métropole Museum of Modern, Contemporary and Outsider Art, Villeneuve-d'Ascq
- Reims, la croix du sud (Southern Cross of Reims), stabile/mobile, 1969, Lille Métropole Museum of Modern, Contemporary and Outsider Art, Villeneuve d'Ascq

=== Germany ===
- Têtes et queue (Heads and Tail), 1965, Neue Nationalgalerie (New National Gallery), Berlin
- Les Triangles, 1963, Museum Ostwall, Dortmund
- Hextopus, 1955, American Consulate General, Frankfurt
- Le Hallebardier, 1971, Sprengel Museum, Hannover
- Pointes et Courbes (Points and Curves), 1970, Abteiberg Museum, Mönchengladbach
- Cinq Pics, 1972, Insel Hombroich, Neuss
- Crinkly with a Red Disc, 1973, Schlossplatz, Stuttgart

=== Italy ===
- Teodelapio, stabile, 1962, City of Spoleto
- Sabot, stabile, 1963, Sculpture Garden, Peggy Guggenheim Collection, Venice
- La Vache, stabile, 1971, Sculpture Garden, Peggy Guggenheim Collection, Venice

=== Ireland ===
- Cactus provisoire, 1967, Trinity College Dublin

=== Israel ===
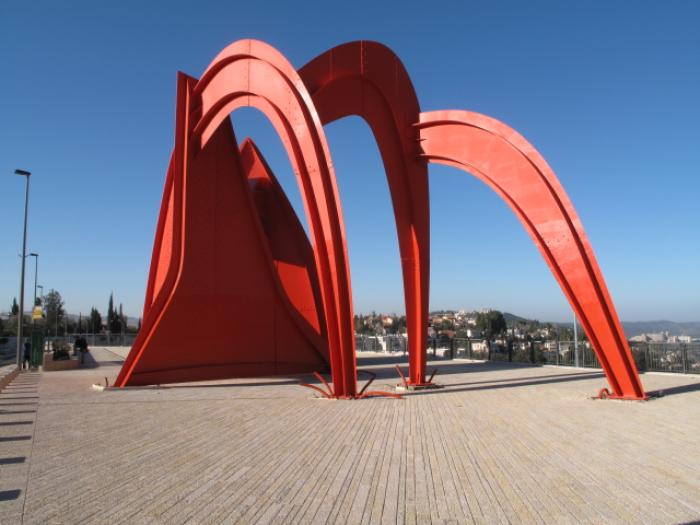
Stabile of Calder "Homage to Jerusalem" at Mount Herzl

- Homage to Jerusalem, 1977, Jerusalem
- The Cow, 1977, Jerusalem Foundation Community Center
- The Sun at Croton, 1960; Untitled, 1967, Israel Museum, Jerusalem

=== Japan ===
- London, 1962, The National Museum of Art, Osaka
- Fafnir-Dragon II, 1969, Nagoya City Art Museum, Nagoya
- Flamingo (intermediate maquette), 1973, The Museum of Modern Art, Otsu

=== Mexico ===
- El Sol Rojo, 1968, Aztec Stadium, Mexico City

=== Monoco ===
- Quatre lances, 1964, Mareterra

=== The Netherlands ===
- Le Tamanoir (Anteater), 1963, borough of Hoogvliet, Rotterdam
- Mobile XII.V – III.H, 1955, Stedelijk Museum, Amsterdam

=== Portugal ===
- Untitled, 1968, Belém Cultural Center, Lisbon

=== South Korea ===
- Grand Crinkly, 1971, Ho-am Art Museum, Seoul

=== Spain ===
- Quatre ailes (Four Wings), 1972, Fundació Joan Miró, Barcelona
- Nancy, 1972, S'Hort del Rei Palma de Mallorca
- Mercury Fountain, 1937, Fundació Joan Miró, Barcelona (for the World Fair in Paris)
- Carmen, 1974, Central Patio, Museo Reina Sofia, Madrid

=== Sweden ===
- Three Wings, 1963, City of Gothenburg
- The Four Elements, 1938/1961, Moderna Museet, Stockholm
- L'un des notres, 1968, Fäladsgården, Lund

=== Switzerland ===
- The Tree, 1966, Fondation Beyeler, Basel
- Big Spider, 1959, Kunstmuseum Basel
- Brasilia, 1965, Fondation Pierre Gianadda, Martigny
- Stabile, 1963, The Nestle Art Collection, Vevey

=== United Kingdom ===
- Brontosaurus (1970), Pace Gallery at Sudeley Castle, Winchcombe, Gloucestershire

=== Venezuela ===
- Mobile, 1950, Villa Planchart – Anala & Armando Planchart Fondation, Caracas
- Red África, 1955, Museo de Bellas Artes, Caracas
- Stabile with horizontal blade, 1953, Universidad Central de Venezuela, Caracas
- Aula Magna (Floating Clouds), 1954, Universidad Central de Venezuela, Caracas
- Estalagmite, 1955, Universidad Central de Venezuela, Caracas
- Snow flurry, 1955, Universidad Central de Venezuela, Caracas
- The Devil's Chair, 1955, Caoma House, Fondation Villanueva Caracas
- Móbile, 1955, Caoma House, Fondation Villanueva Caracas
- The City, 1960, Museo de Bellas Artes, Caracas
- Broken Faces, 1960, Caracas Museum of Contemporary Art, Caracas
