= Grand Rapids SC =

Association football team

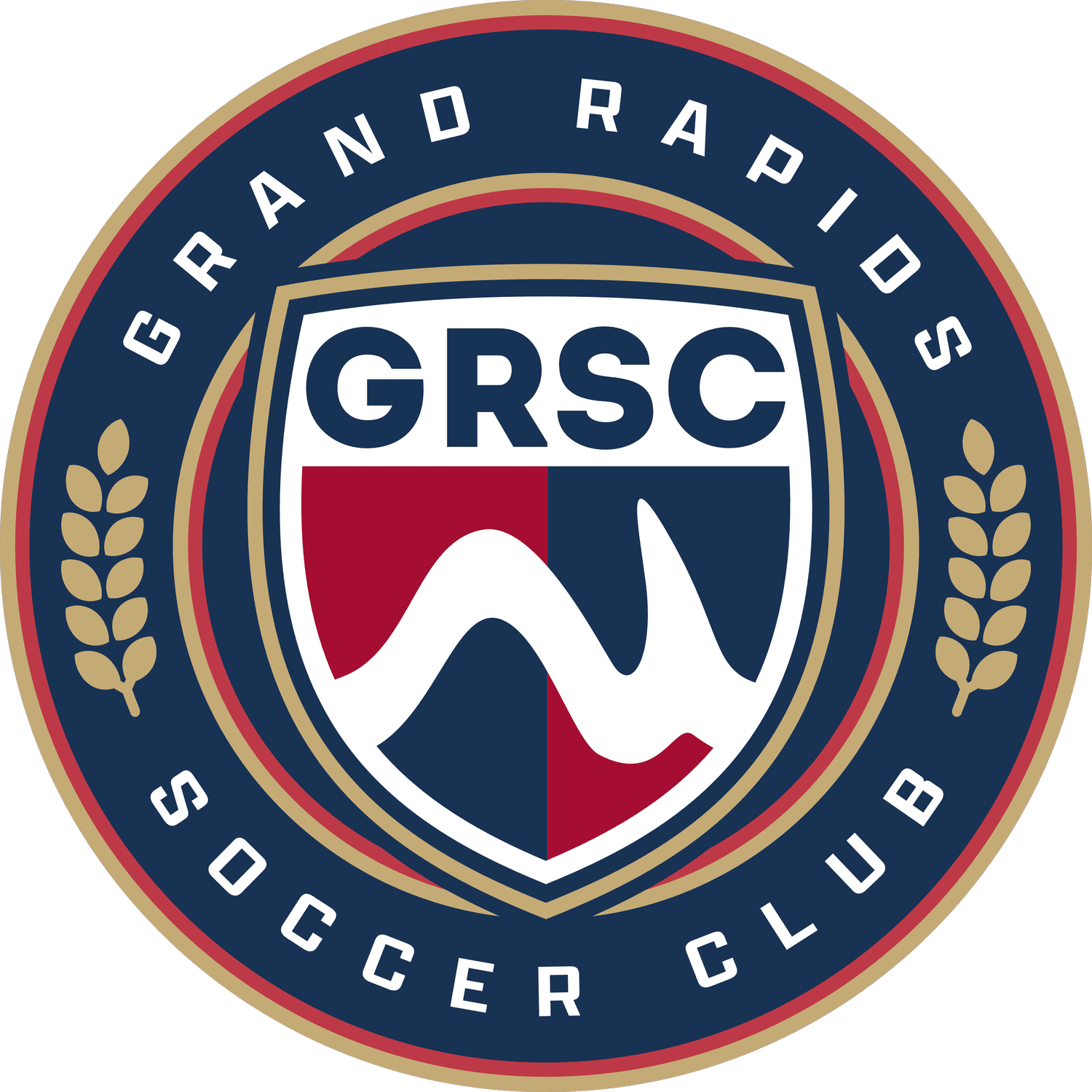
- Full name: Grand Rapids Soccer Club
- Nickname: GRSC
- Founded: 2024
- Website: http://www.grandrapidssc.com/
Home colors	Away colors

Grand Rapids SC is an American soccer club based in Grand Rapids, Michigan, established in 2024. The club participates in the Midwest Premier League.

== History ==
Grand Rapids Soccer Club (GRSC) was established in 2024 by leaders of various local youth clubs aiming to sustainably develop professional soccer in the Grand Rapids area. An initial fundraising event was held on January 17, 2024 in Grand Rapids, MI. In July 2024, the club acquired coaches and players from existing competitive local soccer teams, and was accepted into the United Premier Soccer League for the Fall 2024 season.

Following the Fall 2024 season where GRSC secured third place, the club declared on December 17, 2024, their intention to join the Midwest Premier League, aligning with a robust group of Michigan teams.

== Crest and colors ==
On July 29, 2024, GRSC representatives launched a contest for designing the club's crest, allowing community members to contribute designs and vote on the final badge. The chosen design was then used to shape the club's identity. The crest is circular, centered by a shield displaying "GRSC" in capital letters with a wave pattern below. Encircling the shield, "Grand Rapids Soccer Club" is written. The wave motif honors the La Grande Vitesse, an Alexander Calder sculpture in Calder Plaza, Grand Rapids. The badge features red in homage to the sculpture, blue symbolizing the Grand River, and gold as a tribute to Grand Rapids' thriving brewery scene.

== Statistics ==
=== Year-by-year ===
Season	Record										Position		Playoffs	USOC	Avg. Attendance	Top goalscorer	
Season	Tier	League	Conf/Div	Pld	W	D	L	GF	GA	Pts	Conf	Ovr	Playoffs	USOC	Avg. Attendance	Name	Goals
2024 Fall	4	UPSL	Great Lakes East	10	5	3	2	25	21	18	3rd	-	R1	Ineligible	N/A	(United States) Aaron Gamez	5
2025	4	MWPL	Great Lakes	-	-	-	-	-	-	-	-	-	-	-	-	-	-

1. To enter the U.S. Open Cup, any team whose league is starting its first season of competition must have started its league schedule at least thirty (30) days prior to the Open Division entry deadline (September 12, 2024).
2. Attendance figures have not yet been made public by the organization.
