= Festival of the Arts (Grand Rapids) =

Arts festival in Grand Rapids, Michigan, United States

- The Calder Sun, official logo of Festival
- Status: defunct
- Frequency: Annually
- Location: Grand Rapids, Michigan
- Coordinates: 42.96907°N 85.67059°W
- Country: United States
- Years active: 54–55
- Inaugurated: 1970
- Website: festivalgr.org

The Festival of the Arts – known locally as simply Festival, typically with the year added (e.g. "Festival 2005") – was a three-day multimedia arts festival, held annually at the La Grande Vitesse sculpture in Grand Rapids, Michigan on the first Friday, Saturday, and Sunday of June. The event was free and open to all.

The event featured live performances of music, dance, and other performing arts; displays and sales of paintings and other visual arts; art and sculpture opportunities for children; film/video and literary presentations; and a wide variety of multicultural food booths operated by local non-profit organizations. The festival typically involved nearly 20,000 community volunteers and over half a million visitors. According to the Library of Congress, Festival was the largest all-volunteer arts festival in the United States.

In Feb 2025, the event's organizers announced that the Festival would cease operations.

== History ==
Festival was first held in 1970, inspired by the installation of Alexander Calder's La Grande Vitesse previous year, featuring two stages and a few food booths. The event grew quickly, filling the Vandenberg Plaza by the 1980s, and subsequently expanding into nearby streets, with several performance stages, and more than two dozen food booths. The public event was temporarily suspended in 2020 due to the COVID-19 pandemic, replaced with a virtual event. Festival returned to a free, public live event by 2021.

In 2022, one person was killed and three others injured in an early morning shooting at Festival.

On February 8, 2025, the event's organizers announced in a Facebook post that the Festival would cease operations. The Festival had run for 55 years.
