= Grosse Pointe Public Library Central Branch =

- Grosse Pointe Central Library
- U.S. National Register of Historic Places
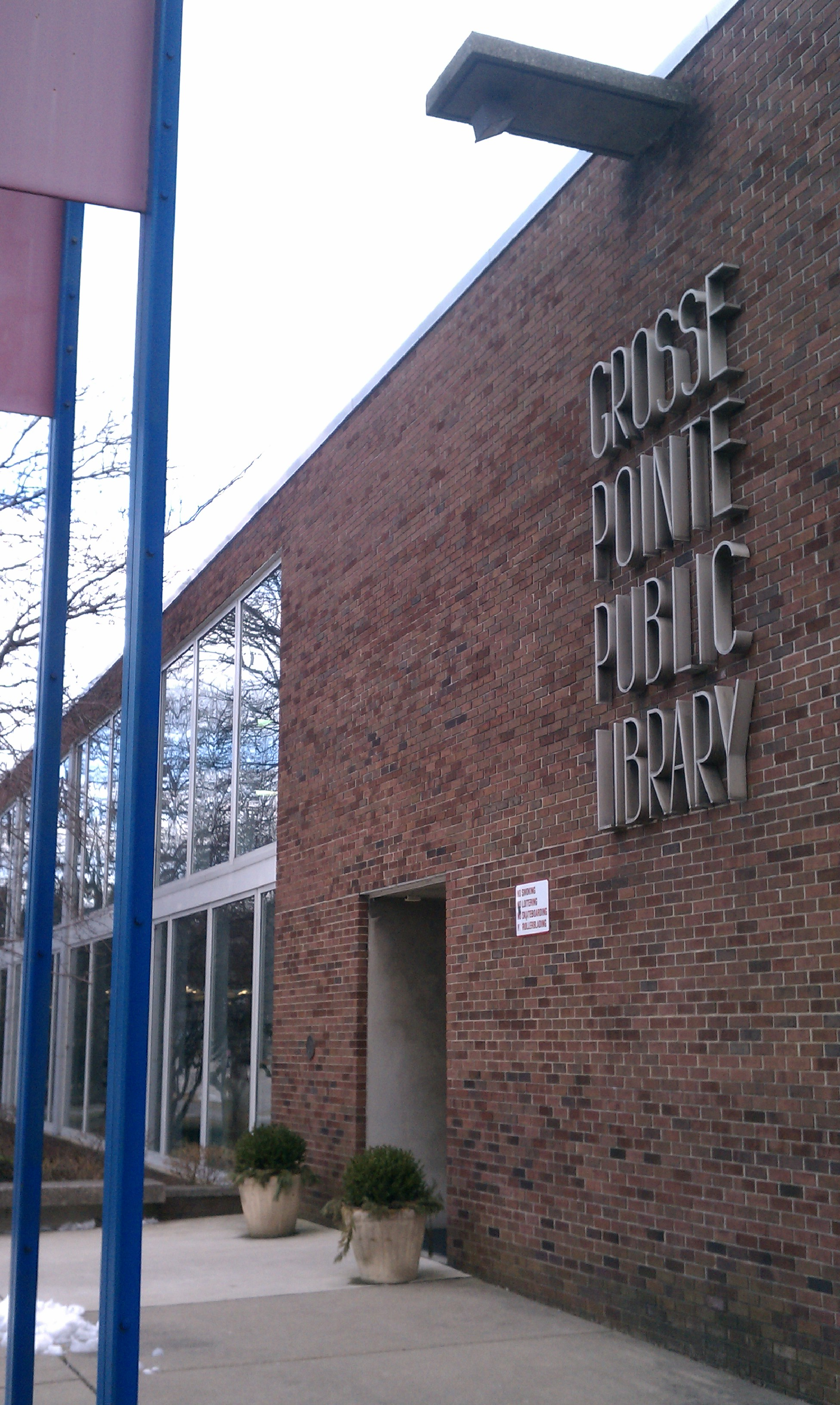
- Interactive map
- Location: 10 Kercheval Ave., Grosse Pointe Farms, Michigan
- Coordinates: 42°23′38″N 82°54′20″W
- Built: 1953
- Built by: Albert A. Albrecht Company
- Architect: Marcel Breuer
- Architectural style: Modern architecture
- NRHP reference No.: 100006438
- Added to NRHP: April 21, 2021

The Grosse Pointe Public Library Central Branch, located at 10 Kercheval Avenue in Grosse Pointe Farms, Michigan, is one of the buildings of the Grosse Pointe Public Library. Constructed in 1953, it is significant as one of the first major public commissions in the United States of architect Marcel Breuer. The building was listed in the National Register of Historic Places in 2021.

== History ==
The Grosse Pointe Public Library was established in 1929 by the school district, and spent over two decades moving from space to space. In 1951, it was decided to construct a permanent space for the library, funded in large part by local businessman Dexter M. Ferry Jr. Ferry's son, W. Hawkins Ferry, had studied architecture under Marcel Breuer at Harvard University, and the Ferry family had commissioned the architect to design previous projects. The library commissioned Breuer to design the new branch, and Breuer, W. Hawkins Ferry, and library director Robert Orr worked through 1951 and 1952 to refine the design. The library opened to the public in 1953.

The building served as the main branch of the Grosse Pointe Library through the rest of the century. In 2007, the library board decided that the building was obsolete, and it should be demolished and replaced with new construction. However, there was both local and international opposition to the decision. That, in conjunction with the Great Recession, led the board to reconsider, and rehabilitate instead. By 2016, interior renovation to correct some of the building's issues was completed, and it remains in service as a library.

== Description ==
The Central Library is a two-story brick rectangular structure with a flat roof. The building is constructed using a series of reinforced cast concrete frames, with exterior walls of cast-in-place concrete with a masonry veneer. The design stresses the use of the rectangle elements both in the plan and on the façade. On the north façade, is a large floor to ceiling window connecting the courtyard and street to the interior. The large window is divided into offset, vertically oriented rectangles. The main entrance is through a recessed rectangle containing metal-framed glass doors.
