= Intermediate Model for the Arch =

Sculpture in Columbus, Ohio, U.S.

- The sculpture in 2018
- Artist: Alexander Calder
- Year: 1975
- Medium: Steel sculpture
- Dimensions: 3.4 m (11 ft)
- Location: Columbus, Ohio, United States
- 39.964946°N 82.987972°W

Intermediate Model for the Arch is a 1975 painted steel sculpture by Alexander Calder, installed in a courtyard outside the Columbus Museum of Art in Columbus, Ohio, United States. The artwork measures 144 in. x 129 in. x 101 in. and was purchased by the Derby Fund. The abstract black sculpture is 11 feet (3.4 m) tall.

== See also ==
- 1975 in art
- List of Alexander Calder public works
