= Homage to Jerusalem =

1977 sculpture by Alexander Calder

Coordinates: 31°46′16.83″N 35°10′52.93″E

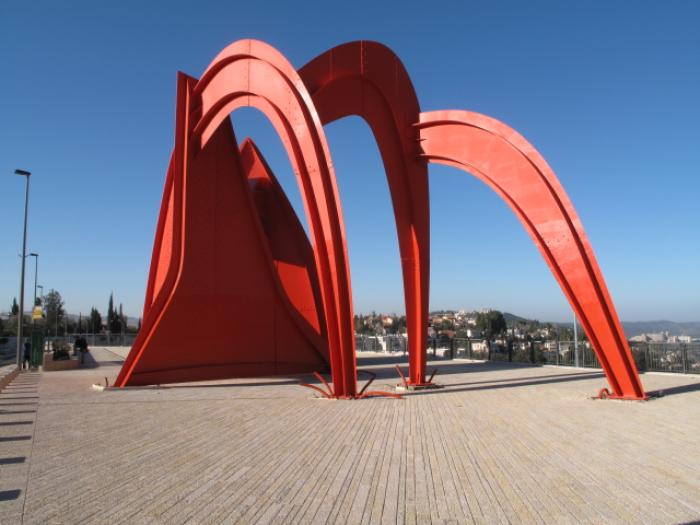
Homage to Jerusalem

Homage to Jerusalem is a 1977 sculpture by Alexander Calder in Holland Square, near Mount Herzl in Jerusalem. It is at the corner of Kiryat Yovel Street and Ein Karem at a view point overlooking the Jerusalem Forest.

== History ==
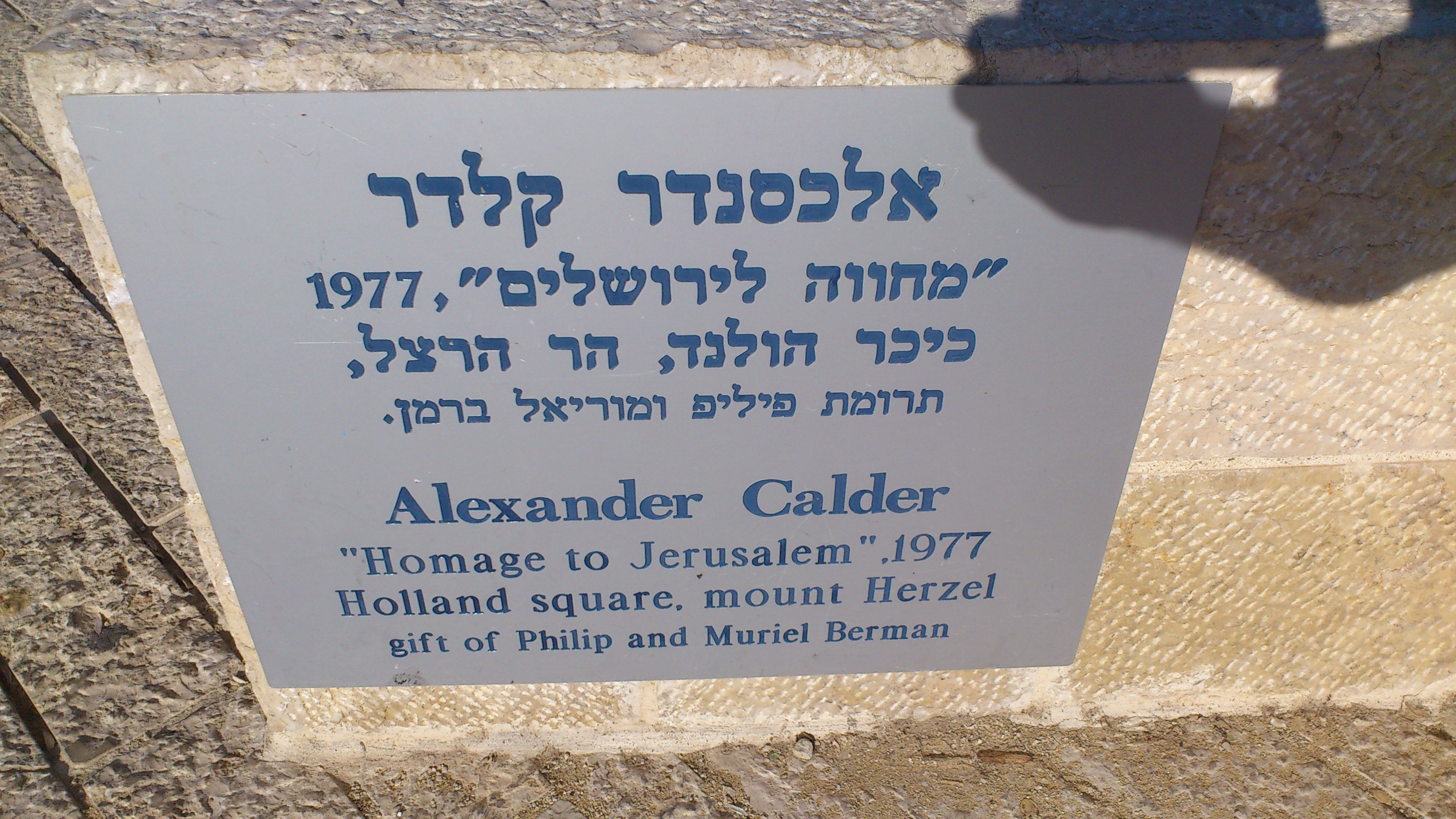
Homage to Jerusalem plaque

When Alexander Calder visited Israel in 1975 with his wife, the Mayor of Jerusalem Teddy Kollek asked him to create a sculpture for Jerusalem. The chosen site for the sculpture was the northeastern slope of Mount Herzl. It was made of bolted sheet metal and painted bright red.

The stabile's components were crated and sent to Israel by boat for on‐the-spot reassembly.

When construction began on the Jerusalem light railway, the sculpture was relocated to a site opposite Shaare Zedek Medical Center.

== See also ==
- Israeli art
- List of Alexander Calder public works
- List of public art in Israel
