= Gwenfritz =

Artwork by Alexander Calder

- Artist: Alexander Calder
- Year: 1968
- Type: sculpture
- Dimensions: 1050.0 cm (413 3/8 in)
- Location: National Museum of American History, Washington, D.C.; 38.89176900°N 77.03196700°W
- Owner: Smithsonian American Art Museum

Gwenfritz is a painted steel abstract stabile, by Alexander Calder. It is located at the National Museum of American History, at 14th Street, and Constitution Avenue, in Washington, D.C.

It was dedicated on June 2, 1969. In 1983, it was relocated from the west front fountain plaza, to a corner location. On October 31, 2014, the sculpture was rededicated after being restored and relocated to its original location.

It is named after Gwendolyn Cafritz, widow of Morris Cafritz, who had helped finance the project as head of the Morris and Gwendolyn Cafritz Foundation.

== See also ==
- Cheval Rouge, National Gallery of Art Sculpture Garden
- List of Alexander Calder public works
- List of public art in Washington, D.C., Ward 2
