= The Four Elements (sculpture) =

Coordinates: 59.3253°N 18.0837°E

- Artist: Alexander Calder
- Year: 1961
- Medium: Sculpture
- Location: Stockholm, Sweden

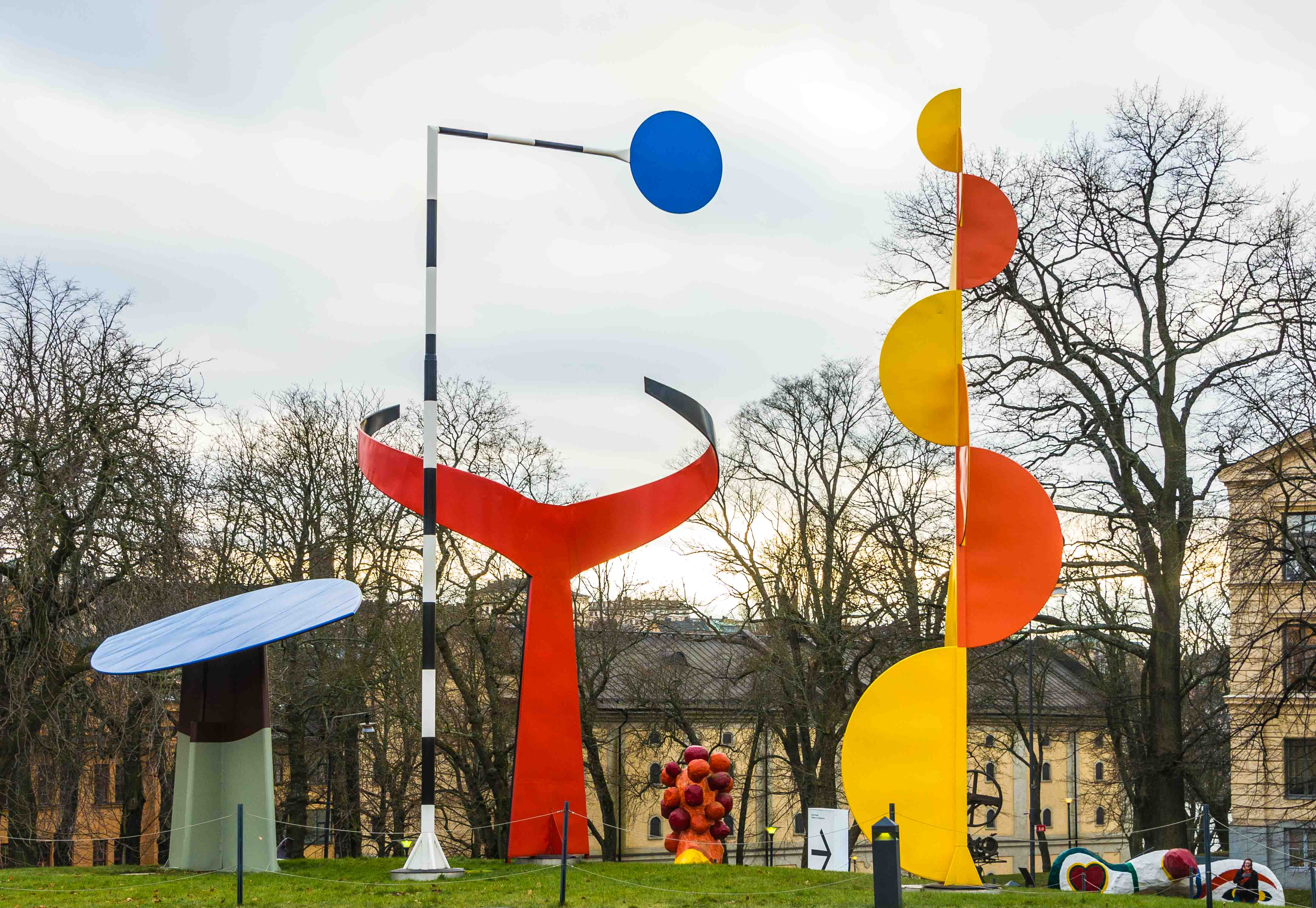
The Four Elements at Moderna Museet in Stockholm

The Four Elements is a monumental mobile sculpture created by the American sculptor Alexander Calder in 1961. The sculpture is a motorized moving group of four metal sheets. The artwork is about 30 feet high. The sheets are painted in plain colours. This sculpture is made after a Calder model from 1938.

The Four Elements is a long-term installation and located in front of the entry to Moderna Museet in Stockholm, Skeppsholmen.

The artwork was brought from New York by Pontus Hultén (that time, the director of Moderna Museet). The Four Elements was a part of the exhibition Movement in Art (Rörelse i konsten), and the exhibition was on display in Moderna Museet from 16 May till 10 September 1961.

As a memory of the artist's extensive presence in the exhibition, Calder's The Four Elements was left standing outside the museum. The artwork became a signature and a veritable symbol of the Moderna Museet. It was donated to the museum by Alexander Calder and the engineer Allan Skarne in 1967. The Four Elements is a part of the Sculpture park (Swedish Skulpturparken) outside the Moderna Museet.

== See also ==
- List of Alexander Calder public works
