= Saurien =

1975 sculpture by Alexander Calder

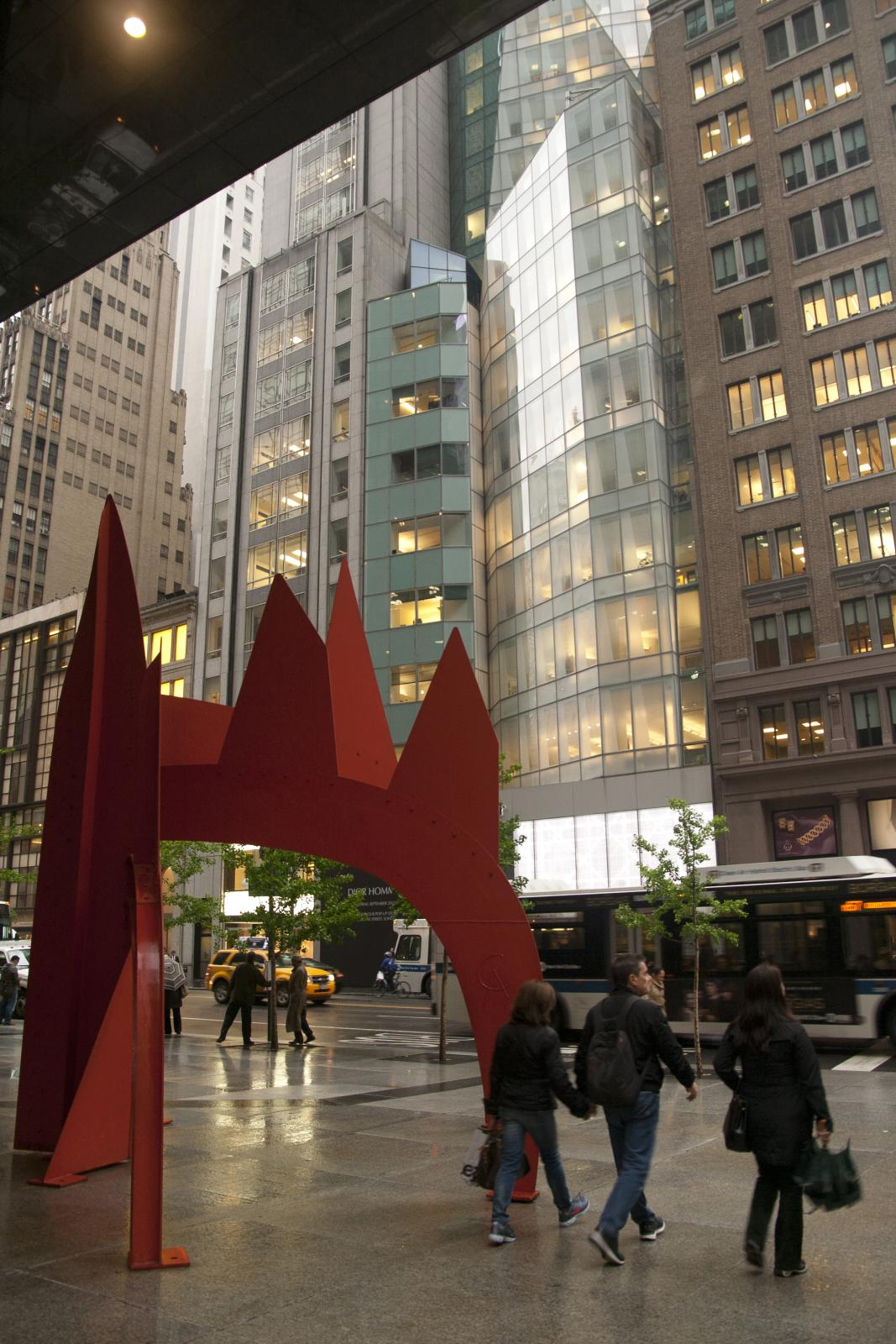
- Artist: Alexander Calder
- Year: 1975
- Dimensions: 5.5 m (18 ft)
- Location: New York City, New York, U.S.
- 40°45′44.1″N 73°58′21.4″W

Saurien is a 1975, 18-foot (5.5 m) tall bright red sculpture by Alexander Calder, installed in Manhattan, New York.

The statue is located in front of 590 Madison Avenue at the corner of East 57th Street and Madison Avenue.

== See also ==
- 1975 in art
- List of Alexander Calder public works
