= Mercury fountain =

Decorative fountain using mercury as the liquid

A mercury fountain is a fountain constructed for use with liquid metallic mercury ("quicksilver") rather than water.

Mercury fountains existed in some castles in Islamic Spain; the most famous one was located at the Kasr-al-Kholaifa in Córdoba.

== Calder's Mercury Fountain ==
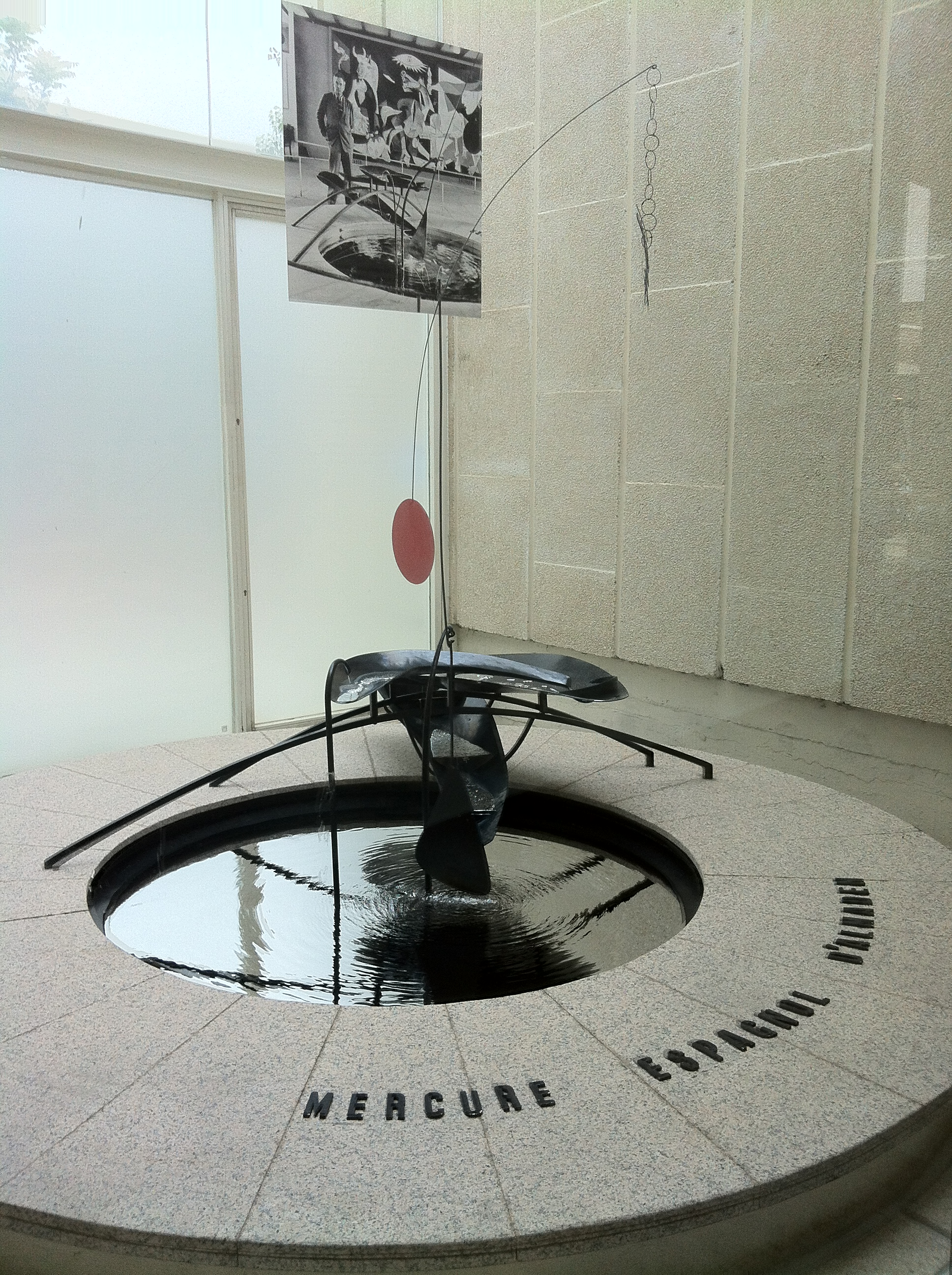
Calder's fountain of mercury at the Fundació Joan Miró in Barcelona

The most well-known modern example is a sculpture designed by the American artist Alexander Calder, commissioned by the Spanish Republican government for the 1937 World Exhibition in Paris. The artwork is a memorial to the siege of Almadén by General Franco's troops; at the time, the region supplied 60 percent of the world's mercury.

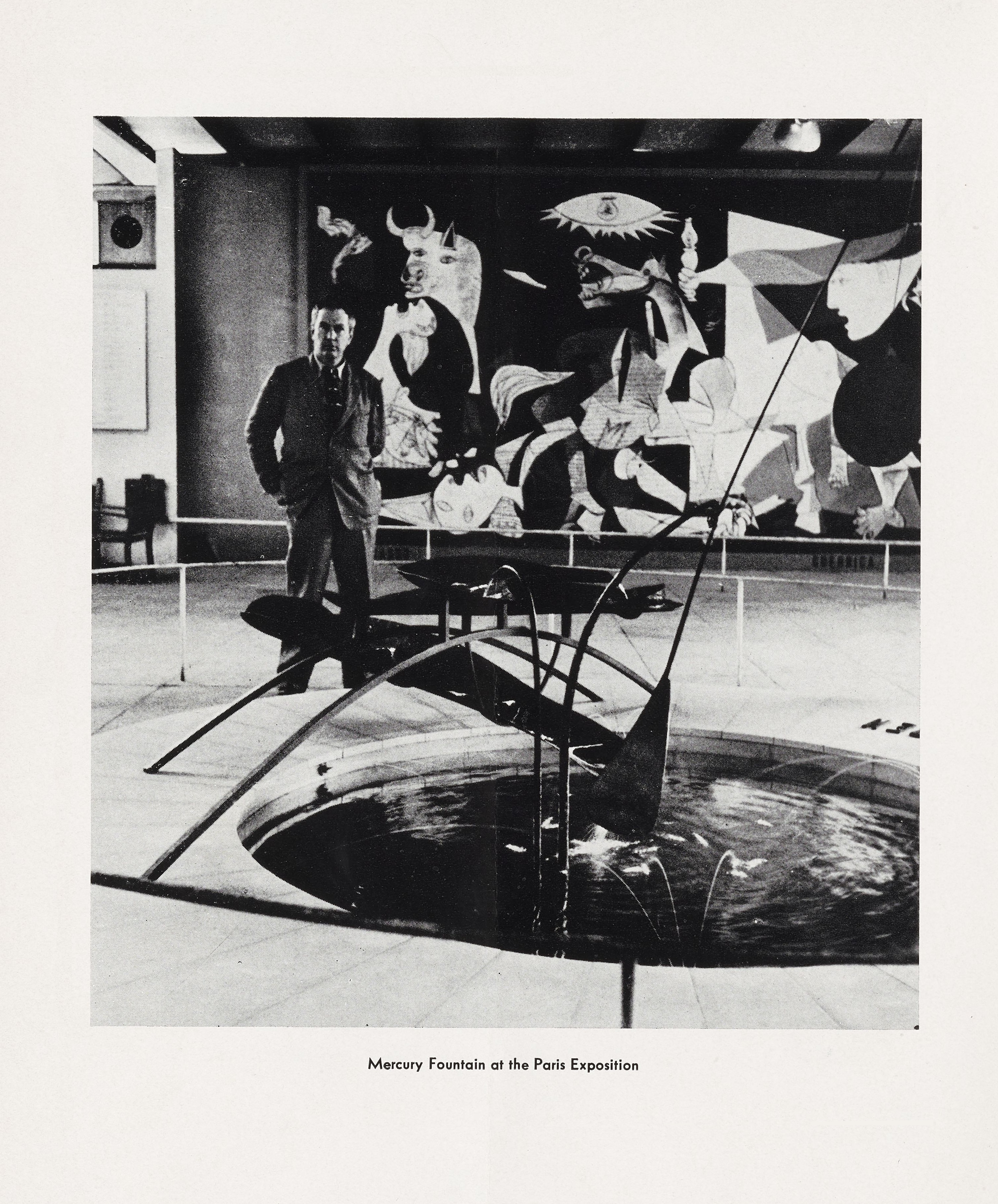
Alexander Calder, pictured with Mercury Fountain and Pablo Picasso's Guernica in 1937

The fountain was a sculptural counterpart to Guernica, Pablo Picasso's protest against Spanish Civil War atrocities. Calder's Mercury Fountain is now at the Fundació Joan Miró in Barcelona, displayed behind glass to control toxic mercury vapors.

== See also ==
- List of Alexander Calder public works
