= 590 Madison Avenue =

Office skyscraper in Manhattan, New York

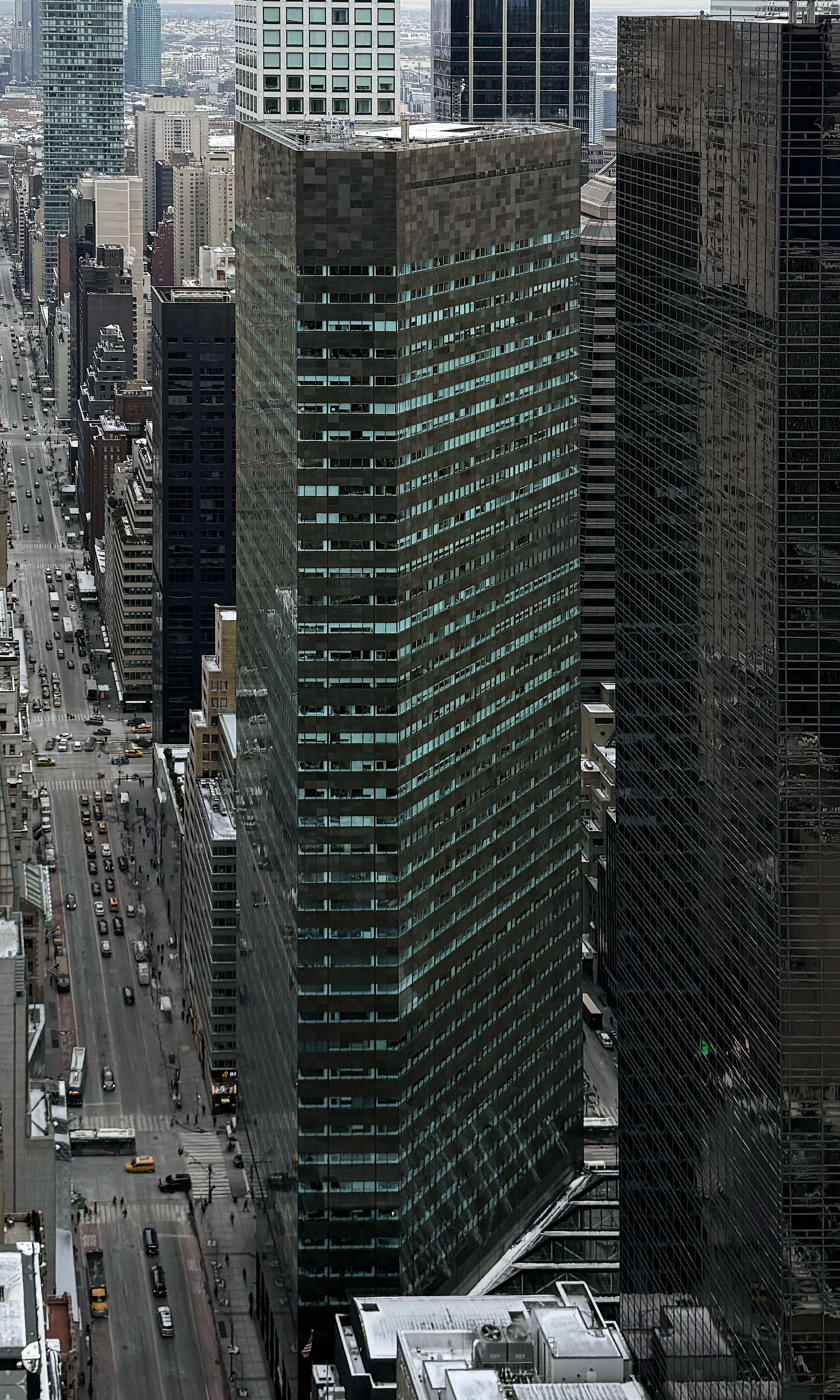
- Viewed from the west
- Interactive map of the 590 Madison Avenue area

General information
- Status: Completed
- Type: Office
- Location: Manhattan, New York
- Coordinates: 40°45′44″N 73°58′17″W
- Construction started: 1979
- Completed: 1983
- Opening: October 4, 1983
- Cost: $250 million
- Owner: RXR Realty

Height
- Roof: 603 ft (184 m)

Technical details
- Floor count: 41
- Floor area: 1,030,000 ft^{2} (96,000 m^{2})
- Lifts/elevators: 24

Design and construction
- Architects: Edward Larrabee Barnes & Associates
- Developer: IBM
- Structural engineer: LeMessurier Consultants; The Office of James Ruderman
- Main contractor: Turner Construction

590 Madison Avenue, also known as the IBM Building, is a skyscraper at 57th Street and Madison Avenue in the Midtown Manhattan neighborhood of New York City. Designed by Edward Larrabee Barnes and Associates the 41-story, 603-foot (184 m)-tall tower was developed for the technology company IBM and built from 1978 to 1983.

The building is shaped like an irregular pentagon, with a chamfer cutting diagonally across what would typically be the southwest corner of a rectangular slab. The facade is made of gray-green glass and polished granite, which Barnes intended would give the building the appearance of a prism. The northeast corner of the tower is cantilevered over the main entrance, and there are no setbacks throughout the building's height. Adjacent to 590 Madison Avenue's southwest corner is a privately owned public space covered by a glass structure, which contains chairs, tables, and bamboo trees.

From 1938 to 1964, IBM was headquartered at one of the previous structures on the site. Despite relocating its headquarters to a suburb of New York City, IBM retained office space at multiple locations in the city and proposed the current skyscraper to consolidate some of its operations. IBM owned the tower until May 1994, when it sold the building to Edward J. Minskoff and Odyssey Partners. Until the sale, IBM occupied most of the building's space; the firm continues to maintain offices in the building, though most space has been leased to other tenants. The State Teachers Retirement System of Ohio, which became a co-owner in 1995 and eventually took over ownership of the whole building, sold it in 2025 to RXR Realty.

== Site ==
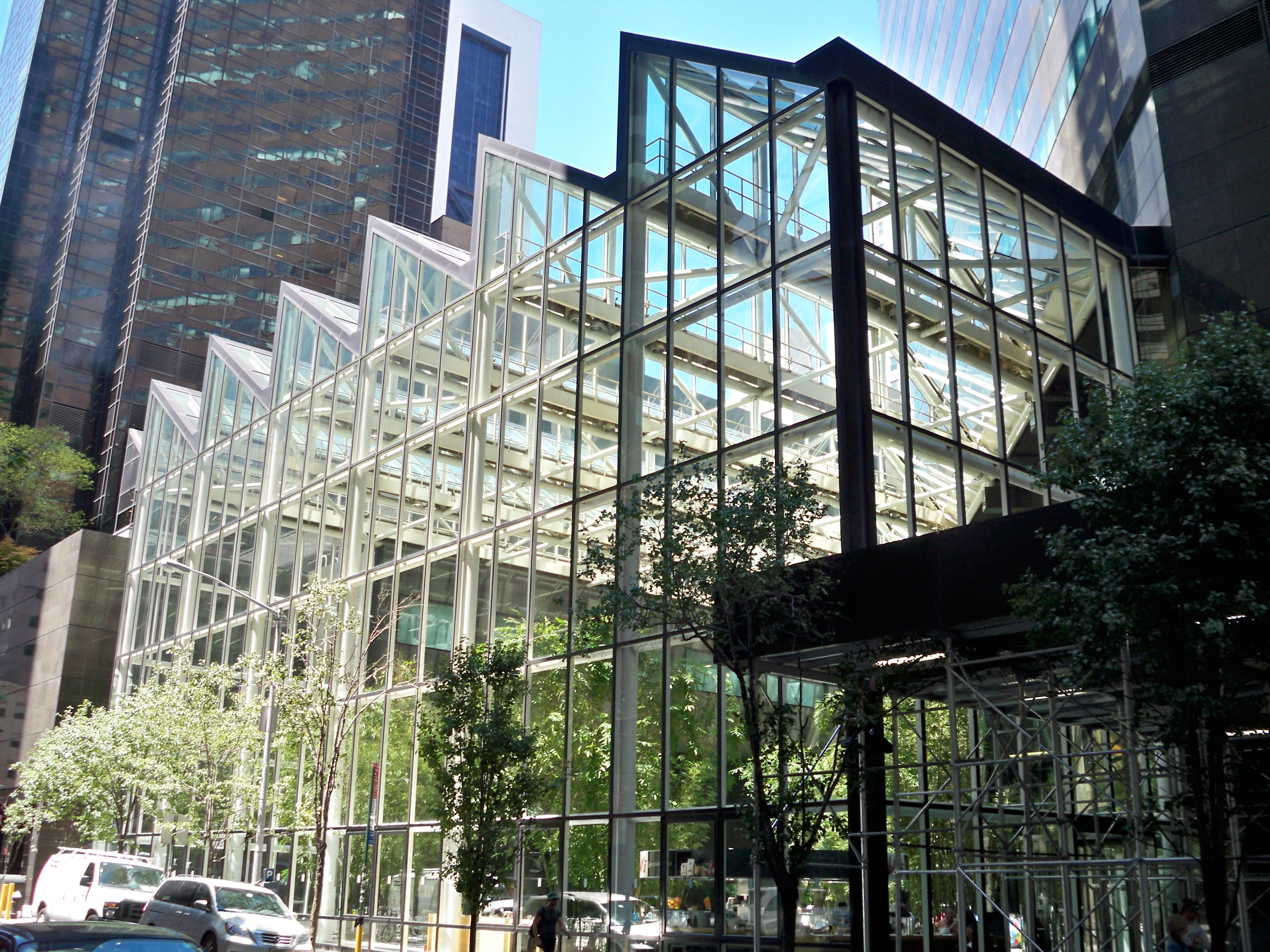
Atrium containing public space

590 Madison Avenue is in the Midtown Manhattan neighborhood of New York City. The rectangular land lot is bounded by Madison Avenue to the east, 57th Street to the north, and 56th Street to the south. The land lot covers approximately 39,162 square feet (3,638.3 m^{2}), with a frontage of 200 feet (61 m) on Madison Avenue and 195 feet (59 m) on both 56th and 57th Streets. The building is on the same city block as Trump Tower and the Tiffany & Co. flagship store to the west. Other nearby buildings include the Corning Glass Building to the southwest, 550 Madison Avenue to the south, Park Avenue Tower and the New York Friars Club to the southeast, 432 Park Avenue to the east, Fuller Building and Four Seasons Hotel New York to the northeast, the LVMH Tower to the north, and 3 East 57th Street and 745 Fifth Avenue to the northwest.

In 1936, the IBM Corporation acquired an existing 20-story building at 590 Madison Avenue, at the southwest corner of 57th Street. The IBM headquarters opened within that building two years later. IBM acquired additional adjacent lots in 1973. At the time, a pair of buildings designed by Carrère and Hastings occupied part of the site. One of these buildings, at 14 East 57th Street, was designed for art gallery operator Roland Knoedler. The current skyscraper's site was also occupied by an eight-story apartment studio at 12 East 57th Street. At the northwest corner of Madison Avenue and 56th Street was a 13-story structure.

== Architecture ==
590 Madison Avenue was originally owned by IBM and thus called the "IBM Building". 590 Madison Avenue was designed by Edward Larrabee Barnes and Associates. John M. Y. Lee and Armand P. Avakian were the associates-in-charge while Richard Klibschon was the project architect. Antanas Vytuvis was the chief resident architect. In addition, James Ruderman was the structural engineer, LeMessurier Associates was the structural consultant, and Joseph R. Loring & Associates was the mechanical and electrical engineer. Turner Construction was the general contractor.

The 41-story building is 603 feet (184 m) tall and contains a pentagonal floor plan. Adjacent to the building on its southwest corner is an enclosed atrium, a privately owned public space covered by a glass structure. As of 2020, the State Teachers Retirement System of Ohio owns the entire building and holds the land under it. A portion of the land owned by STRS Ohio is leased to The Trump Organization.

=== Form ===
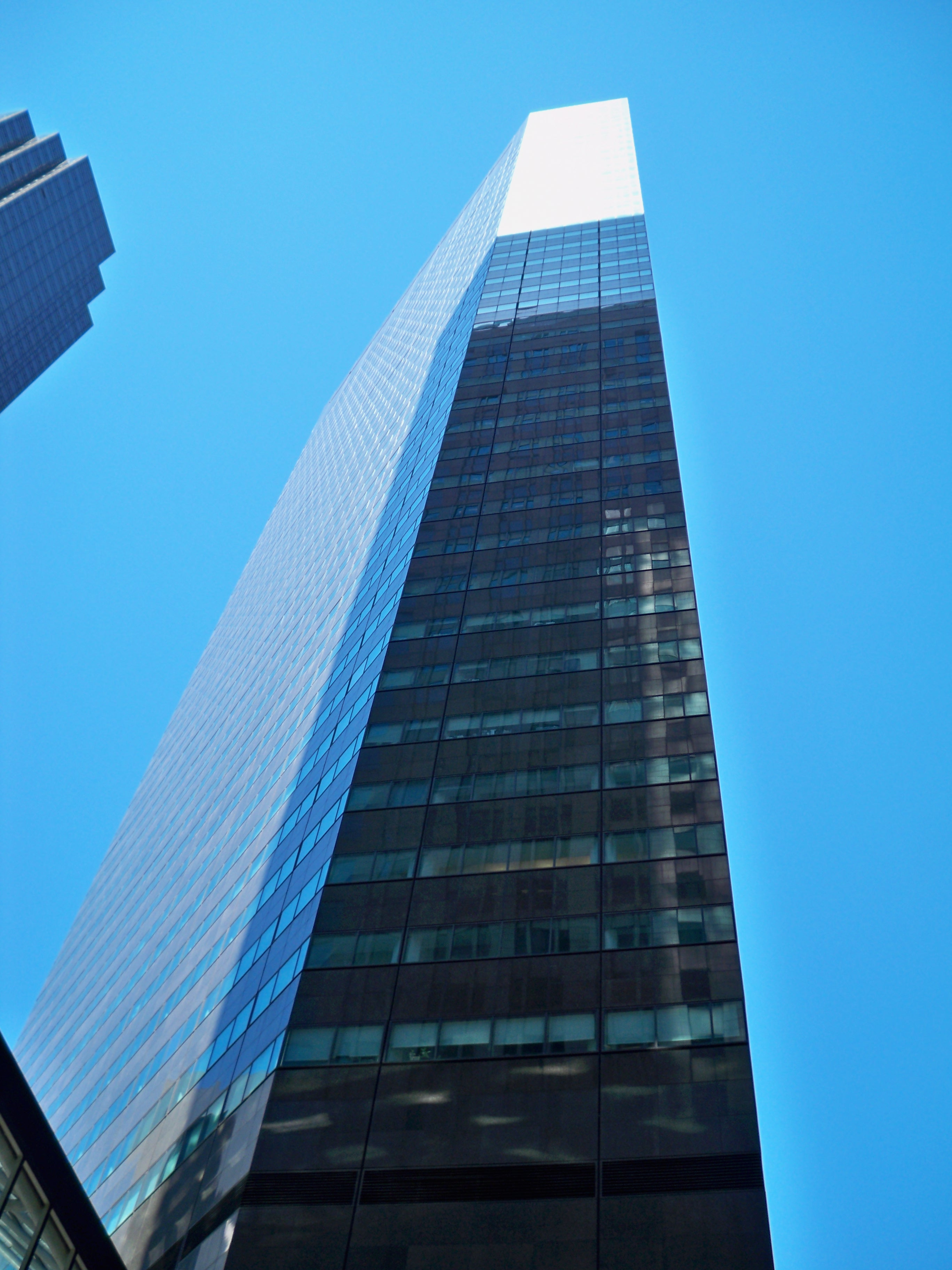
Seen from the south; the chamfer at the southwest corner can be seen at left

The building was designed as a pentagonal wedge, with a large chamfer that cuts into the rectangular massing at the site's southwest corner. According to Barnes, this shape was chosen to highlight the presence of the public atrium, which otherwise would have been overlooked due to its relatively nondescript location in the middle of the block. Barnes believed in the observance of an older New York City zoning law, with the low-rise section of a skyscraper on a narrow street and the high-rise section on a wider street. As Madison Avenue and 57th Street are both wider than 56th Street, the bulk of the building is angled toward the former two streets at the northeast corner of the site. The tower runs along the lot line on 57th Street but is set back 10 feet (3.0 m) from Madison Avenue. The sidewalk, between the curb and the building's exterior wall, is made of green-granite squares measuring 40 by 40 inches (1,000 by 1,000 mm). The presence of the atrium at the southwest corner of the lot, and the fact that the tower only occupies 40 percent of the site, allowed the rest of the building to rise without setbacks.

Structurally, 590 Madison Avenue is a pentagon, with columns closely clustered on three sides (the southern and western facades are relatively short). At the time of the IBM Building's completion, many of its contemporaries were International Style designs that used rectangular shapes. Originally, the building was conceived with widely spaced groups of columns, but wind-tunnel tests found that the arrangement lacked rigidity and would cause the building to sway. The building was thus stiffened, with columns being spaced every 14 feet (4.3 m) and with strengthened spandrel beams.

The first three floors at the northeast corner of the building are also chamfered. This allows the tower to cantilever over the main entrance at Madison Avenue and 57th Street. The truss above the entrance only supports the weight of about ten stories above it. Most of the stories above the cantilever are instead supported by the other columns around the perimeter, which are strengthened at the base. The cantilever reportedly added $10 million to the construction costs (equivalent to $26 million in 2024). The inclusion of the cantilever was in keeping with Barnes's tendency for "symbolic rather than purely structural expression", as author Eric Nash described it.

==== Atrium ====
590 Madison Avenue contains a public atrium, originally known as the Garden Plaza. The atrium is alternatively cited as covering 8,200 square feet (760 m^{2}), 8,261 square feet (767.5 m^{2}), 10,000 square feet (930 m^{2}), or 11,000 square feet (1,000 m^{2}). It was built under the terms of the 1961 Zoning Resolution, which allowed New York City developers a zoning "bonus" for including open space in front of their buildings, and its presence enabled the addition of 100,000 square feet (9,300 m^{2}), the equivalent of five stories. The atrium is within the chamfer created by cutting off the building's southwest corner. This atrium directly connects to Trump Tower's atrium, connecting west to Fifth Avenue. Combined with the atrium at 550 Madison Avenue, the atrium also creates a continuous corridor between 55th and 57th Streets. Originally, the atrium was meant to provide access to the adjacent Bonwit Teller department store building to the west. (Note: The Bonwit Teller store was razed and replaced with Trump Tower in the late 1970s. By the time the IBM Building's atrium opened in 1983, Bonwit Teller was in Trump Tower.) In a 2000 study of over five hundred privately owned public spaces across New York City, Jerold Kayden classified the building's atrium as one of fifteen that were "of such high quality that they draw visitors from around the city".

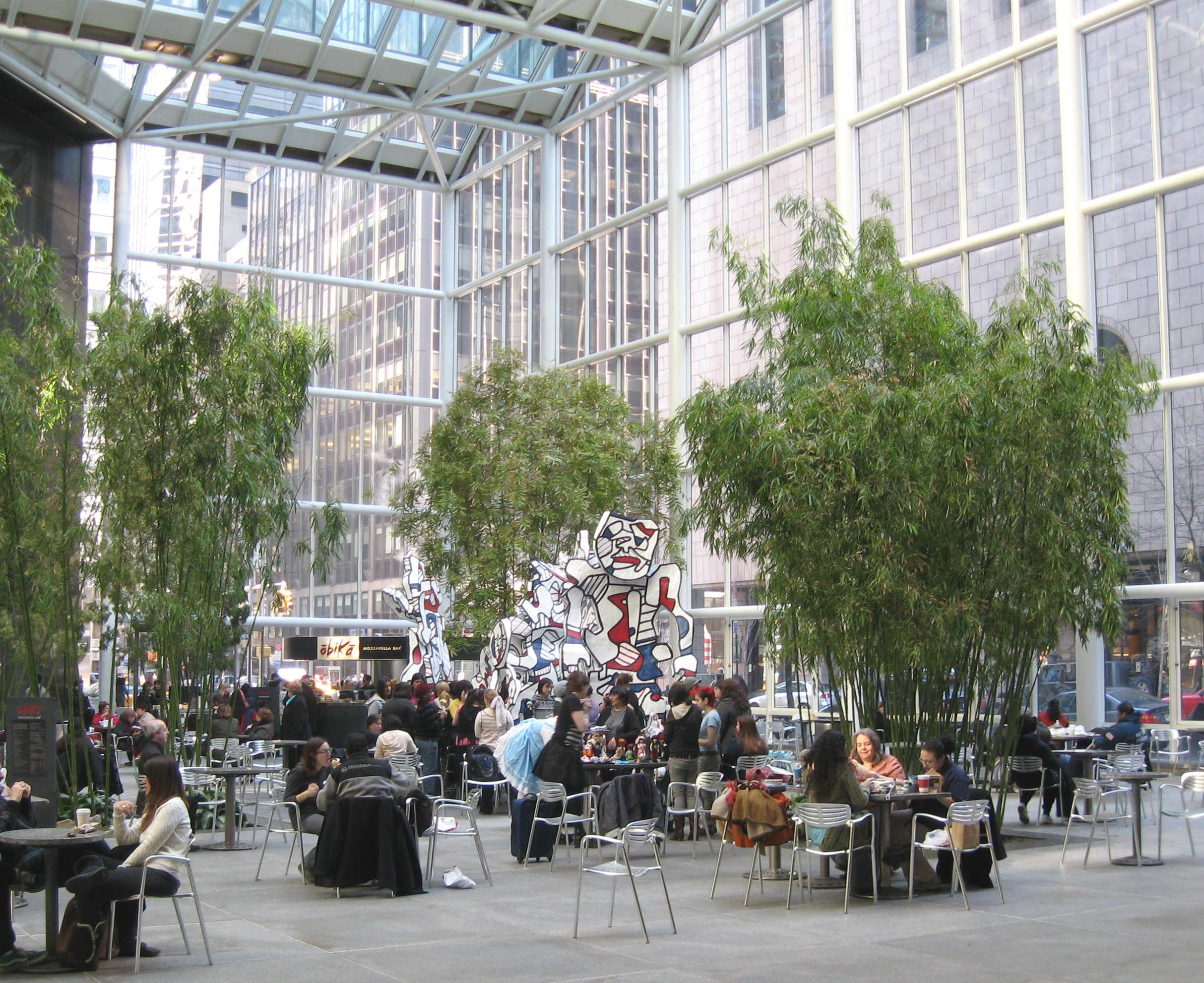
590 Madison Avenue's atrium, including North Carolina-sourced bamboo trees, is enclosed.

Most of the atrium is enclosed by a sawtooth-shaped glass canopy rising 68 feet (21 m). The canopy itself is 16 feet (4.9 m) tall and consists of six ridges. There is an illuminated ceiling above the western part of the atrium, connecting the entrances on 56th and 57th Streets. The atrium was designed to be temperature-controlled, with an air conditioning system cooling or heating the space if the temperature outdoors fell below 32 °F (0 °C) or above 95 °F (35 °C). This keeps the atrium at a similar temperature to climates in Virginia or North Carolina, between 40 and 90 °F (4 and 32 °C). To conserve energy, the windows were double-glazed and tinted. The atrium was originally conceived as a space that was open to the outdoors, but wind tunnel testing showed that doors needed to be added at each end.

Zion and Breen were hired to landscape the atrium. Some 300 North Carolina-sourced bamboo trees were arranged in eleven groves, illuminated by lighting from 2 to 7 a.m. each day. The New York Botanical Garden was tasked with maintaining the atrium and operated a shop there. After a renovation in 1995, eight sculptures were installed in the atrium, which was rebranded "The Sculpture Garden at 590 Madison". Eight of the eleven bamboo groves were retained. The atrium contains food and drink kiosks, tables, chairs, and receptacles, and it is also used to display artwork. Below ground level, the atrium was designed with an exhibition space called the Gallery of Science and Art, covering 13,000 square feet (1,200 m^{2}), though this space closed in 1993.

==== Sculptures ====
At the southeast corner of the site, on the corner of Madison Avenue and 56th Street, is a steel-and-granite fountain entitled Levitated Mass. The fountain was created by Michael Heizer and dedicated in 1982. It contains an 11-short-ton (9.8-long-ton; 10.0 t) boulder within a frame measuring 25 by 16 feet (7.6 by 4.9 m), surrounded by a ledge with pedestrian seating. The boulder appears to float over running water. To create the fountain, Heizer sheared off the top of a large rock and cut grooves into the surface before setting it on supports hidden within a stainless steel structure. Heizer said of the fountain's name: "I don't use Greek names as titles, or dedicate artworks to my friends. I simply describe what it is."

At the northeast corner of the site, underneath the cantilevered main entrance on the corner of Madison Avenue and 57th Street, is a bright red sculpture by Alexander Calder, entitled Saurien. Standing 18 feet (5.5 m) tall, it was completed in 1975. The sculpture's name refers to the French spelling of the word "saurian", which in turn refers to a reptilian clade. The sculpture was installed under the main entrance during a 1995 renovation.

=== Facade ===
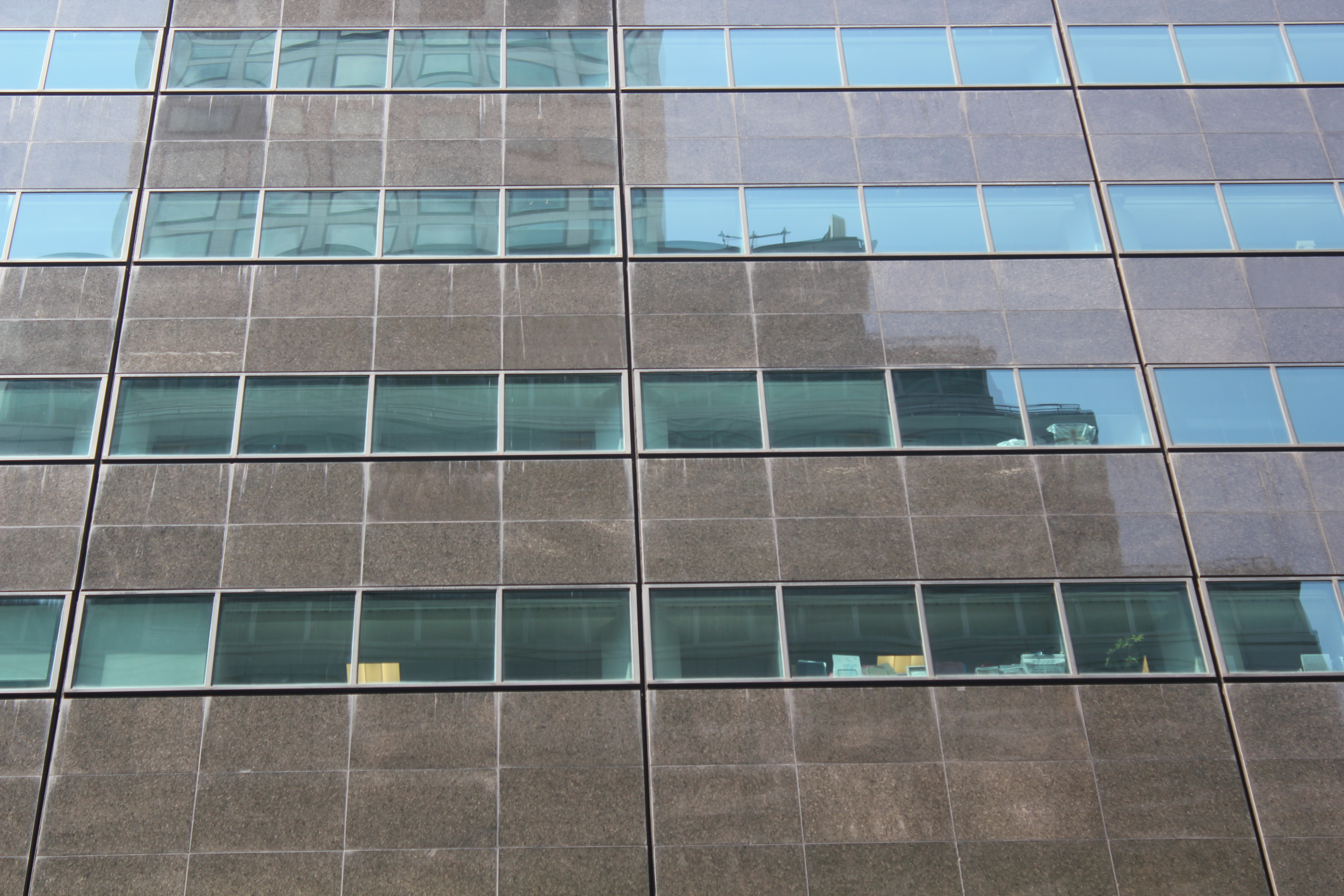
Facade detail

The building's facade consists of horizontal strips of gray-green glass between spandrel panels of polished granite. The gray-green facade was intended to blend in with the Corning Glass Building as well as 590 Madison Avenue's atrium. About 15,000 slabs of Canadian granite are used on the facade. American sculptor James Rappa was hired to select the granite from the LaCroix quarry in Saint-Sébastien, Estrie, Quebec, and classify it with three grades of quality. Rappa discarded the lowest-quality granite and used the highest-quality material on the lower stories. Barnes had specified the granite be polished because it would help make the building look like a prism. In total, the granite slabs cover around 270,000 square feet (25,000 m^{2}).

Each slab has surface dimensions of 3.5 by 5 feet (1.1 by 1.5 m) (Note: The New York Times rounded this to 5 by 4 feet (1.5 by 1.2 m).) and is about 3 inches (76 mm) thick. Eight slabs are mounted to a single truss to create a continuous panel generally measuring 7 by 20 feet (2.1 by 6.1 m). At the building's chamfer and each corner, the panels are half as wide. The panels measure 9.5 inches (240 mm) thick in total. The 3-inch-thick granite slabs, at the front of each panel, are mounted to the truss using stainless-steel angles. In case rust developed on the trusses, the rust would not stain the granite. The outside face of each truss, directly behind the granite slabs, contains ducts. The backs of the panels consist of 2 inches (51 mm) of mineral insulation. Each panel is attached to the building's superstructure at six locations.

The windows comprise 35 percent of the facade. Each window is double-glazed and consists of a blue-green 0.25-inch (6.4 mm) outer pane and a clear 0.25-inch (6.4 mm) inner pane, separated by a gap of 0.5 inches (13 mm). The double-glazing allows 65 percent of light into the building. Moisture protection for the window frames and granite spandrels was developed concurrently. In case the insulation sealant failed, rainwater could collect at the bottom of each spandrel, where it could flow down the facade's vertical mullions to the bottom of the window. The rainwater could then drain to ground level through a notch used by the building's window cleaning equipment, preventing ice buildup and granite staining.

=== Interior ===
The building was designed with 38 floors of offices, an employee cafeteria story, two retail stories, and two mechanical stories. There is also a 78-spot parking garage. 590 Madison Avenue has 1,030,000 square feet (96,000 m^{2}) of floor area and 24 elevators, according to its official specifications. Eighteen of the elevators are for passengers while six are for freight. The elevators are oriented on a diagonal axis in the lobby, being positioned within banks that run from southwest to northeast. The lobby itself is a triple-height space, designed with a direct view of the atrium behind it. Barnes had intended for the lobby to be a continuation of the exterior and, as such, the lobby's floor contains granite pavement. Artworks are also displayed in the lobby.

Chermayeff and Geismar Associates were the graphics consultants and Donald Bliss was the lighting consultant. On the upper stories, offices are arranged around the core, though the arrangements are flexible. The office stories have a minimum ceiling height of 9 feet (2.7 m) and some perimeter offices can have a ceiling height of at least 9.5 feet (2.9 m). There is a 3,000-kilowatt (4,000 hp) diesel electricity generator that can provide energy to the building in case of power outages.

== History ==
IBM's headquarters had been at the previous structure at 590 Madison Avenue from 1938 to 1964, when it moved to Armonk, New York, a northern suburb of New York City. IBM kept offices at 590 Madison, but it had decided to move its administrative officials after a successful experiment with opening a suburban office. The next year, it bought a plot at the northwest corner of Madison Avenue and 50th Street, next to the old headquarters.

=== Development ===
==== Planning ====
By 1969, IBM had hired architect I. M. Pei to draw preliminary plans for a skyscraper replacing its old Madison Avenue headquarters. The company rejected Pei's plans for unknown reasons. IBM acquired several other adjacent buildings and unsuccessfully attempted to acquire the air rights over the Tiffany & Co. flagship store and the Bonwit Teller store to the west. In 1973, IBM completed the acquisition of plots adjacent to its old 590 Madison Avenue headquarters. This gave the company a plot of 54,000 square feet (5,000 m^{2}), of which 40 percent could be used for the development of a skyscraper with up to 45 floors and 972,000 square feet (90,300 m^{2}). Barnes had been hired to make "preliminary plans" for the skyscraper. During the early design stages, IBM ran computer models to determine how to minimize the building's energy usage.

By December 1976, Barnes had developed plans for a five-sided skyscraper with 830,000 square feet (77,000 m^{2}) of space across 38 stories. The building would allow IBM to consolidate many of its offices across the city, which at the time comprised 1.5 million square feet (140,000 m^{2}) at 23 locations. IBM already occupied most of the space in the six existing structures on the site. To accommodate its operations, IBM had to lease space at several other buildings across the New York metropolitan area. The skyscraper would be able to fit eight of IBM's twelve Manhattan offices and would also contain exhibition space at the rear. Barnes contemplated whether to make the facade out of granite, glass, aluminum, or steel. Barnes decided to use gray-green granite, so his design team traveled to several quarries across the world, including in Canada, Norway, Czechoslovakia, and Africa. Ultimately, Barnes chose a sample of consistently mottled Canadian granite quarried in Quebec, eschewing a sample quarried from upstate New York with a more random pattern.

==== Construction ====
The original building was demolished starting in 1977. A New York Times editorial in January 1978 praised the IBM project, as well as the AT&T Building being constructed simultaneously at 550 Madison Avenue, as a "declaration of corporate commitment" to New York City, which had then recently rebounded from its fiscal crisis. Plans for the building had been changed by July 1978, when the site had been cleared. Work was about to proceed on the skyscraper, which had been revised to 43 stories (including the concourse and mezzanine at the building's base). John Burgee, architect of the neighboring AT&T Building, said at the time that he had designed the AT&T project with a pink facade to complement the planned IBM Building's gray-green facade. The Associated Press described the IBM Building as an extension of a "building boom" in the city that also included the AT&T Building and the Grand Hyatt New York. Turner Construction was selected the same month as the construction contractor.

Because the IBM and AT&T buildings were simultaneously under construction on 56th Street, access to that street was limited. As a result, trucks delivering materials for both buildings would be backed up for several blocks along Madison Avenue. The first of the building's granite facade slabs was delivered in early 1981. After being quarried in Quebec, the granite was sent to Hohmann & Barnard's facility in Hauppauge, New York, on Long Island. Hohmann & Bernard carved the granite into slabs, and ten truckloads of four slabs each were sent to the worksite every week. At the construction site, the panels were assembled and a sealant was applied. By 1982, the atrium was being furnished.

=== Opening and early years ===
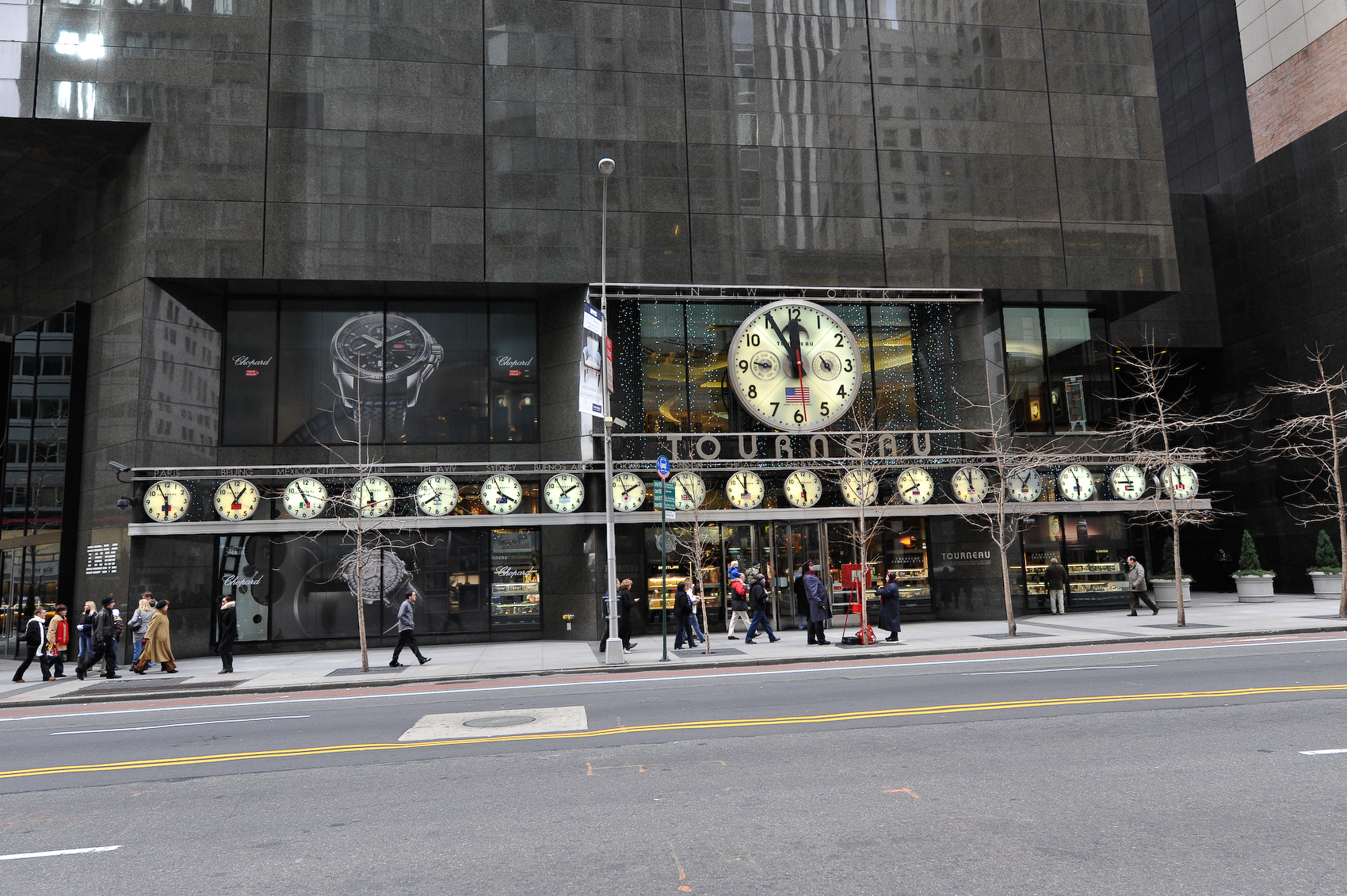
Tourneau storefront

The IBM Building was dedicated on October 4, 1983. The first exhibition in the building's public gallery, "Innovation in IBM Computer Technology", opened that month, showing devices made by the company over the previous five decades. From the outset, IBM owned 590 Madison Avenue and occupied all of the space within the building. Jerold Kayden wrote that the building's public atrium became "New York City's peerless privately owned public space". Initially, the bamboo plants in the IBM atrium were not well maintained, as the bamboo plants died within six months of being planted. To solve this issue, horticulturalists rotated the plants every six months, which IBM supported up until the company's budget tightened.

Economic troubles in the early 1990s forced IBM to downsize some of its real estate holdings. By 1993, IBM no longer occupied much of 590 Madison Avenue and was offering it under subleases to other companies. That March, IBM announced it would close the Gallery of Science and Art in the lower atrium to save money, despite the fact that the gallery saw 500 to 750 thousand visitors every year. The following year, IBM indicated it would lease out as much as half of the building's office space.

=== 1990s sale and renovations ===
In May 1994, IBM sold the building to a joint venture of Edward J. Minskoff and Odyssey Partners for an estimated $200 million. IBM leased back a third of the space. The other two-thirds of the building remained unleased because of IBM's reduced occupancy requirements, However, with a recovering market for office space, real estate executives quoted in The New York Times said that Minskoff and Odyssey would not have a difficult time leasing the space. Rumors circulated that IBM would relocate its headquarters back to Manhattan from Armonk, though IBM denied the reports. The following year, the State Teachers Retirement System of Ohio, a pension fund, was brought on as a partner. The pension fund received a five-year floating-rate mortgage from the Morgan Guaranty Trust Company.

By 1995, the atrium had become dingy and there were complaints that homeless people were loitering in the atrium. That year, Minskoff proposed modifying the atrium; since it could affect the building's development bonus, the New York City Planning Commission had to review and approve the proposal. Minskoff planned to use forty percent of the atrium space for exhibiting sculptures and remove many trees, tables, and chairs. Critics objected that the public character of the atrium would be altered. The commission ultimately approved a modified plan for the atrium renovation that October. The renovations, designed by Robert A. M. Stern, were completed in December 1995. Other disputes over the atrium involved disagreements over whether the atrium should be closed during the daytime. Part of the former Gallery of Science and Art space was taken in 1995 by the Freedom Forum organization, which stayed there until 2001. Watch retailer Tourneau used another portion of the former gallery starting in 1996.

A little more than a year after Minskoff and Odyssey bought the building, only seven floors were still unoccupied. This was in part due to a slight decline in office rents. STRS Ohio bought the remaining ownership stake in the property in 1997. The building was worth $500 million by 1998, a 150 percent increase over what Minskoff and Odyssey had paid for it four years prior. Odyssey wished to sell the building and hired Eastdil Realty to determine the value of its stake, but Minskoff said he would not sell his stake.

=== 2000s to present ===
The Dahesh Museum of Art relocated into 590 Madison Avenue's exhibition space in 2003. STRS Ohio received a $350 million senior mortgage for the building in 2007 from Goldman Sachs. The following year, the mozzarella bar Obika opened within the atrium, and Bonhams took some of the former IBM gallery space. In 2014, STRS Ohio considered selling a 49 percent minority ownership stake in 590 Madison Avenue. The Safra family of Brazil were reportedly interested in taking the minority ownership stake; the family's offer would value the building at over $1.5 billion. STRS Ohio instead opted to refinance the building in 2015 with a ten-year, fixed-rate senior mortgage of $650 million, provided by Goldman Sachs. Moed de Armas and Shannon conducted a renovation of the building, which was completed in 2016. The lobby was refurbished and the elevator cabs were replaced as part of the project. STRS Ohio placed the building for sale in mid-2018, seeking up to $1.3 billion. At the time, IBM still occupied 120,000 square feet (11,000 m^{2}) within the building. IBM announced in 2022 that it would be moving its offices to One Madison Avenue, while other space was leased to financial tenants.

By 2024, further tenants had downsized their space in the building, which at the time was 77% occupied, a similar occupancy rate to other buildings nearby. At the time, STRS Ohio was contemplating further renovations at 590 Madison Avenue. In February 2025, STRS Ohio placed the building for sale with an asking price of $1.1 billion; several developers such as Blackstone Inc., RXR Realty, RFR Holding, SL Green Realty, and Tishman Speyer bid for the structure. RXR Realty won the right to buy the building for $1.1 billion in May 2025, making a down payment the next month. RXR's equity partner on the deal is Elliott Investment Management, the hedge fund founded by Paul Singer. The purchase was finalized in August, making it the costliest sale of a New York City office building in seven years, and Apollo Global Management provided a $785 million loan to fund the purchase.

== Tenants ==
As of 2020, almost half of the building's space was leased by the top ten tenants. IBM was the largest tenant with 11 percent of the space. Other tenants include:

- Apollo Global Management, asset management firm
- Berkshire Hathaway HomeServices New York Properties, residential brokerage
- Bonhams, auctioneer (mostly in the retail space)
- Corcoran Group, real estate brokerage
- Crowell & Moring, law firm
- Colony NorthStar, private equity real estate
- EF Hutton, stock brokerage
- Morgan Stanley, financial services
- Regus, industrial services
- LVMH, fashion conglomerate; occupies four stories
- Tourneau, watch retailer (in the retail space)
- Tsai Capital, investment manager

== Critical reception ==
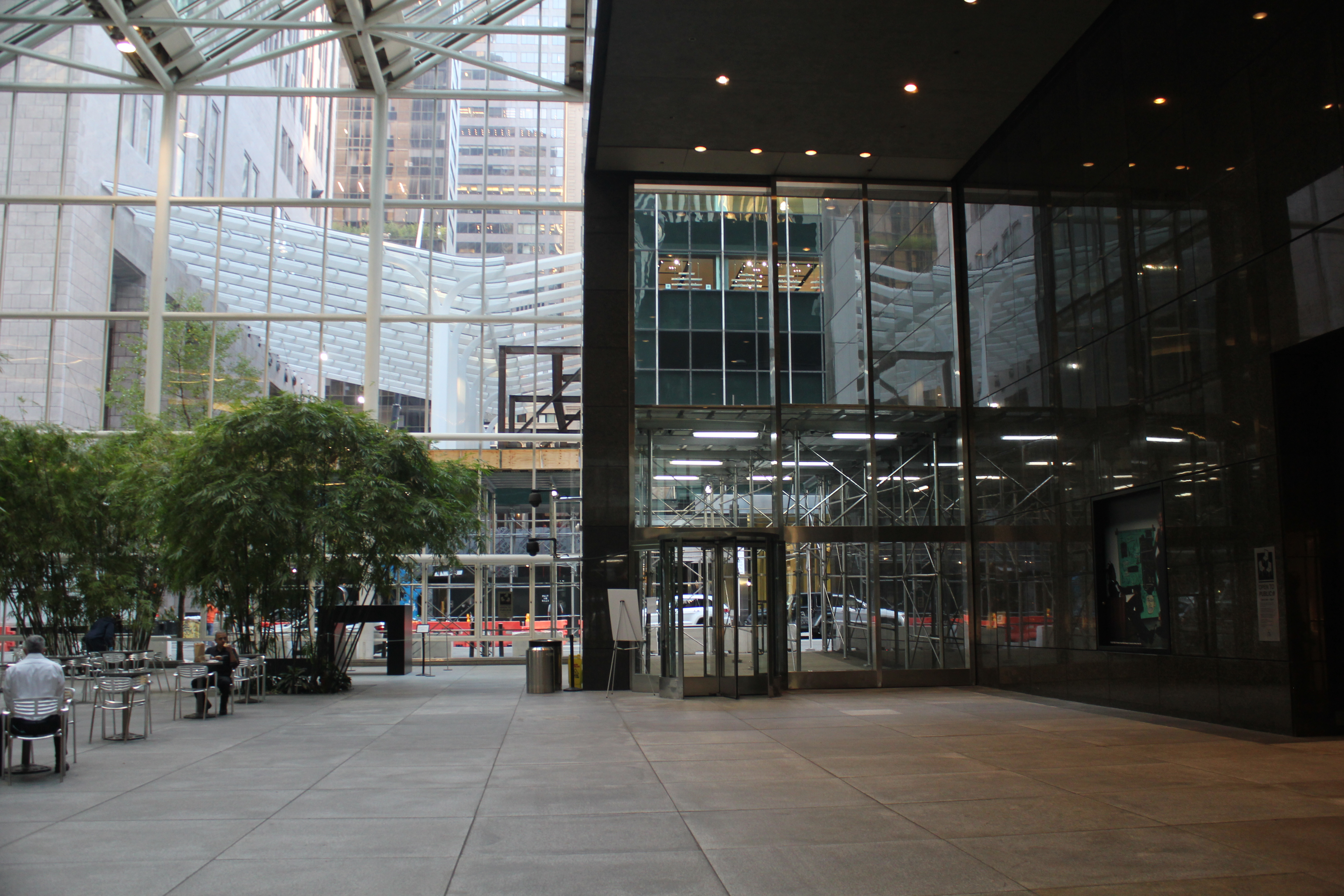
The atrium in November 2021, looking south toward 550 Madison Avenue

Before construction commenced, New York Times architecture writer Paul Goldberger said in July 1978, "IBM promises to be a dignified addition to midtown Manhattan", despite his feeling that the design was "conservative indeed". As construction proceeded, Goldberger remained ambivalent about the tower, saying that the pentagonal shape and cantilevered entrance were "dramatic gestures" but that the facade looked too much like stone. Der Scutt, architect of the neighboring Trump Tower, said in 1981 in response to criticism of 550 and 590 Madison Avenue: "I can't find anything oppressively hideous in IBM or AT&T. What is wrong with 'a showcase of superscale' in a city that prides itself as being culturally ecstatic about it's [sic] skyscrapers?"

Goldberger was greatly disappointed when the building was completed, writing in 1983 that the design has "generally fallen short of expectations", particularly in its atrium, entrance, and facade. He strongly preferred the design of 535 Madison Avenue three blocks south, also designed by Barnes. Architectural critic Brendan Gill likewise said of IBM: "Their idea of social awareness was to include a museum and an atrium lobby. They forgot that the building destroys the scale of the area." Martin Filler also disliked the design of the facade and atrium, though he praised Heizer's fountain as "superb". After the renovation of the atrium, Goldberger still disapproved of its design, saying that the "Zen"-like quality of the original atrium "is now compromised". In the book New York 2000, Robert A. M. Stern wrote that the IBM Building "was a challenge to the prevailing Modernist taste for glass, but it lacked the iconoclastic panache" of Philip Johnson's pink-granite design of 550 Madison Avenue.

There was also praise of the building. Architectural Record said in 1984: "The IBM Building may share with [the Seagram Building] the honor of being one of the two best Modern Movement skyscrapers yet built". Mildred Schmertz of the same magazine said that, with his design for 590 Madison Avenue, Barnes "has demonstrated that a building that faithfully follows the esthetic canons of the Modern Movement can, like postmodernism, be 'contextual'." Ada Louise Huxtable wrote that "IBM's taut, refined skin of granite and glass upstages AT&T like a suave fashion model next to a fussy dowager in a home-made dress". The New York State Association of Architects gave the building its 1984 Award of Excellence, saying: "This building may be eventually labeled as one of the very great skyscrapers of the 20th century."

Some critics also regarded the atrium highly. Anthony Paletta of The Daily Beast said in 2022 that 590 Madison Avenue "features a very appealing atrium" in addition to the lobby's large collection of art. Architectural critic Donald Martin Reynolds said the atrium and street "are ingeniously combined so that there is no loss of space, each one flowing into the other". The book Privately Owned Public Space describes the atrium as "A tree-filled conservatory and public living room rolled into one".

== See also ==
- List of tallest buildings in New York City
