= Grosse Pointe Public Library =

Library in Michigan, USA

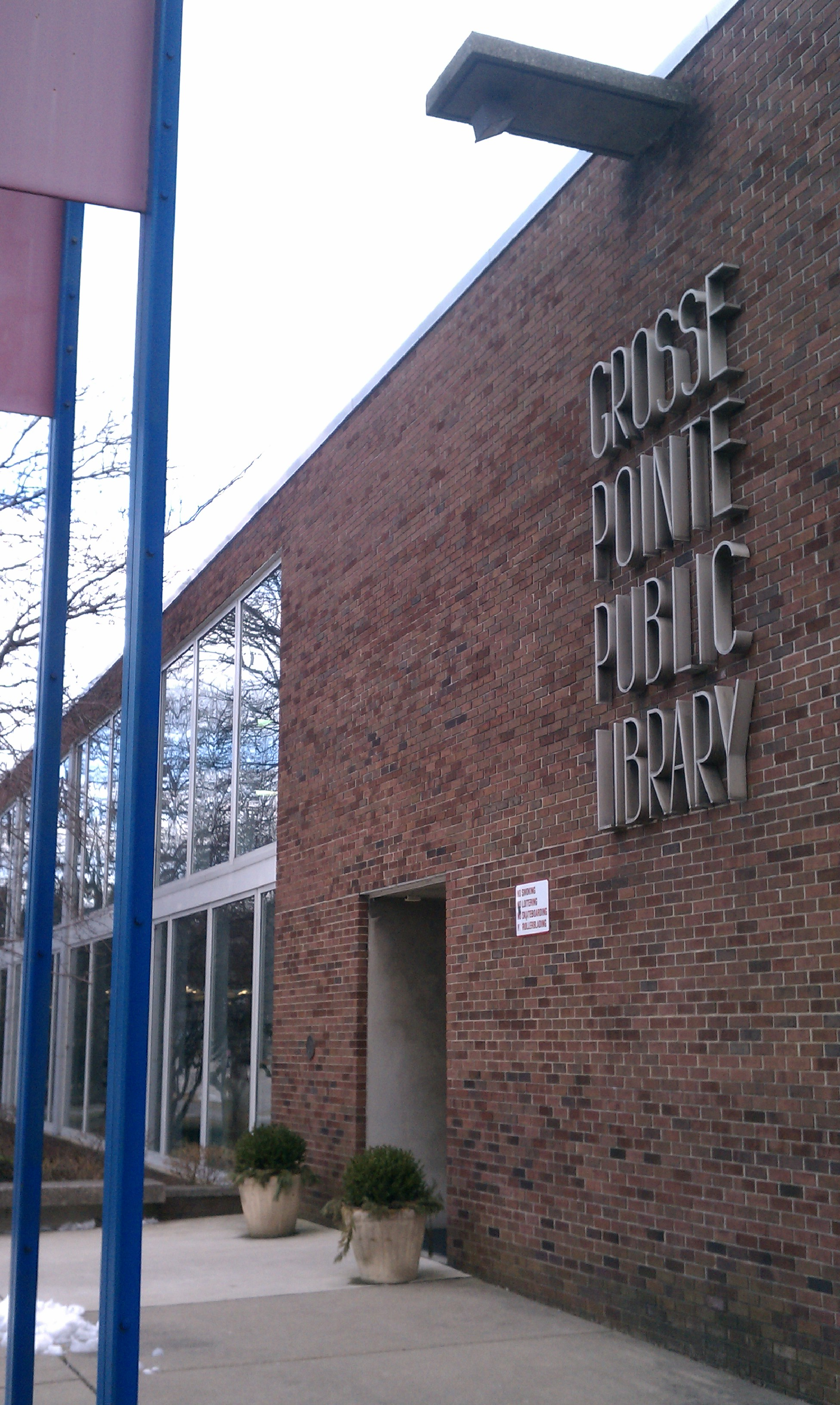
The Central Branch of the Grosse Pointe Public Library system

Grosse Pointe Public Library is a public library system serving the Grosse Pointe area of Wayne County, Michigan.

The Carolyn and Ted Ewald Memorial Branch Library in Grosse Pointe Park was scheduled to open in 2004. The 15,000 square feet (1,400 m^{2}) branch was originally scheduled to open in October of that year, but delays moved the opening month to January 2005.

The library owns an original mobile created by artist Alexander Calder, which was appraised at $10 million in July 2015.

== Branches ==
The system has three branches:

- Central Branch (Grosse Pointe Farms)
- Ewald Branch (Grosse Pointe Park)
- Woods Branch (Grosse Pointe Woods)
