= Eagle (Calder) =

Sculpture by Alexander Calder in Seattle, Washington, U.S.

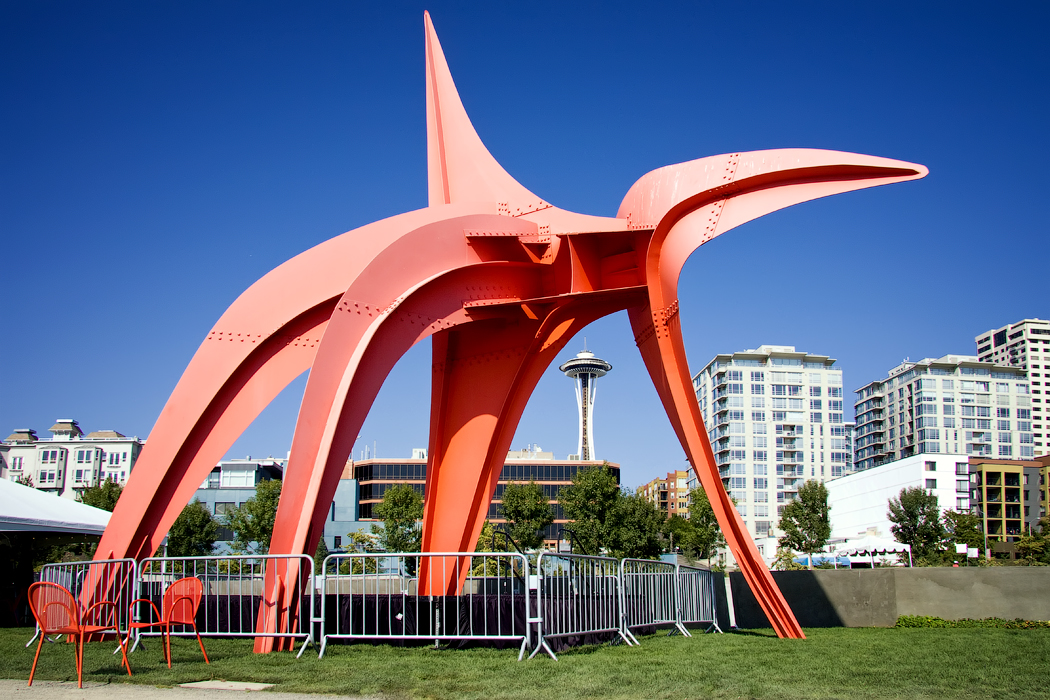
- Artist: Alexander Calder
- Year: 1971
- Type: Sculpture
- Dimensions: 11.81 m × 9.8 m × 9.91 m (38 ft 9 in × 32 ft × 32 ft 6 in)
- Location: Seattle, Washington; 47.61655°N 122.35587°W
- Owner: Seattle Art Museum

Eagle is an abstract sculpture by Alexander Calder. It is located at the Olympic Sculpture Park, Seattle.

== History ==
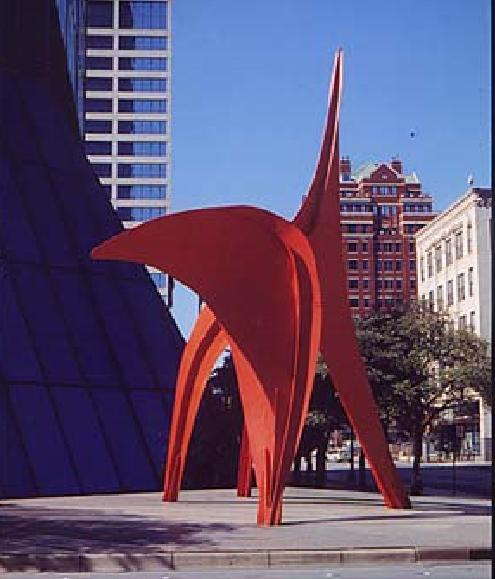
Calder Eagle original site at Bank One in Fort Worth.

It was located at the Bank One building, 500 Throckmorton Street, Fort Worth, Texas. It was commissioned by Fort Worth National Bank. It was constructed in 1971 of painted sheet steel. It was erected, and dedicated on February 15, 1974. It was relocated in 2000 after being purchased by the Seattle Art Museum with funding from Jon and Mary Shirley.

== See also ==
- List of Alexander Calder public works
