= Mountains and Clouds =

Sculpture by Alexander Calder

Coordinates: 38.8931°N 77.0042°W

- Artist: Alexander Calder
- Year: 1986
- Type: sculpture
- Dimensions: 16 m × 23 m (51 ft × 75 ft)
- Location: Hart Senate Office Building; Washington, D.C.
- Owner: Architect of the Capitol

Mountains and Clouds is a sculpture by Alexander Calder located in the Hart Senate Office Building.

== Background ==
The Hart Senate Office Building, first occupied in 1982 and named for Michigan Senator Philip A. Hart, broke with tradition. Unlike its predecessors, the Hart Building boasted a contemporary, energy-efficient design that could accommodate a growing number of staff members and various technological innovations. The building's centerpiece is a towering, asymmetrical 90-foot (27 m)-high atrium whose skylight brightens corridors and offices.

While the building was under construction, a panel of curators was charged with identifying potential sculptors and establishing criteria for the commission of a contemporary work to enliven the atrium. Alexander Calder and four other artists were invited to submit proposals. Calder was approached through his dealer, Klaus Perls, on July 29, 1975, just after his 77th birthday. A sketch and a model for Mountains and Clouds were submitted by November and, in April 1976, Calder's innovative design was accepted.

== Design and delays ==
On November 10, 1976, Calder brought the Mountains and Clouds maquette—his 20-inch (510 mm) sheet-metal model—to Washington, D.C., to present it to the Architect of the Capitol and finalize the placement of the piece. After making minor adjustments to two of the clouds, he expressed satisfaction with the maquette as positioned in a model of the atrium. This proved to be a final visit: Calder died of a heart attack that night after he returned to New York City. Despite his death, the approval of the maquette and the siting of the work meant that fabrication of the full-sized sculpture could proceed. But in 1979, fabrication was delayed and nearly terminated when public funds for the sculpture were eliminated from the costly construction budget for the Hart Building.

Financial assistance materialized in 1982 through Senator Nicholas F. Brady, who believed the Calder sculpture to be "the right work for the right place at the right time." As New Jersey’s senator for eight months—appointed to a vacancy pending election of a successor—Brady wished to present a gift to the Senate on his departure and offered to raise the needed funds. Together with art collector and philanthropist Paul Mellon and former Treasury Secretary C. Douglas Dillon, Brady formed the Capitol Art Foundation, which accomplished the task. The Calder sculpture was installed in the atrium of the Hart Building in 1986.

In 2014, the Clouds were lowered for a safety analysis and never put back. On its website, the Architect of the Capitol explains: “Since the structural safety analysis identified the clouds as unsafe for reinstallation due to significant structural defects, the Architect of the Capitol, in consultation with the Calder Foundation, has determined that the best course of action is to refabricate the clouds to the artist’s original intent.”

== Appearance ==
Because the interior of the atrium presents a complex background of doors, windows, balconies and stairwells capped by a coffered ceiling, Calder stressed simplicity in the design of the sculpture. Similarly, because of the polished white marble that dominates the space, he decided on a matte black surface for the entire piece. The mountains–- the stabile–- are made up of four flat, angular steel plates with five mountain peaks among them and two archlike legs, one branching off the other. The clouds–- the mobile–- consist of four overlapping, curvilinear aluminum plates. In the absence of any air source to propel them, they are turned by a computer-controlled motor, which generates random patterns. Shortly after their installation, the clouds ceased to move when a mechanical problem with the design of the main bearing prevented the motor-driven shaft from turning the clouds. After an exhaustive inspection of the bearing system, the office of the Senate superintendent awarded a contract in October 2001 for the redesign and manufacture of a new bearing system that will again set the clouds in motion.

The placement of Mountains and Clouds makes the sculpture part of the entire irregularly shaped public space of the building, not just part of the east atrium. Calder's genius in positioning it led to the work's great success. The atrium is directly entered from the east doors to the building. As one passes through a low lobby, only a section of the black steel sheets of the mountains appears, perceived as a virtually flat surface. The whole complex composition becomes apparent only when one reaches the junction of lobby and atrium. Suddenly, the full height of the atrium and the sculpture astonishes the viewer. Had the enormous work been centered in the atrium, it might have produced an overwhelming sense of oppression or confinement. But by locating the nearest portion of the stabile some 40 feet (12 m) from the atrium's east wall, Calder allowed viewers the necessary space and distance to take in the whole work.

The sculpture extends into the large north-south corridor (as tall as the atrium) that continues through the entire building. Most visitors probably experience the sculpture first from that corridor. They may notice it immediately on entering either the north or south doors, when one of the arch-shaped legs of the mountains appears to step out from the atrium into the corridor, or when one of the clouds enters or leaves the corridor's air space.

Approaching Mountains and Clouds from the south entrance gives a different impression; one initially sees only two mountain peaks, and the highest seems to touch or merge into the lowest cloud form. From this perspective, it is the mountain-cloud unit that impresses.

Perhaps the most satisfying view is from the north. The work presents an open, more fully readable composition of two or three peaks with legs and clouds that seem to float in front of the mountains. There is a large circle cut through one of the mountain sheets, offering, from this view, needed relief from the massive stabile. The arch-shaped legs are reminiscent of flying buttresses and, like flying buttresses, they provide both support and aesthetic pleasure.

The walls of the atrium in which Calder's mountains stand are pierced on many levels by balconies, windows, and walkways. Thus, the mountains may be climbed, in a sense, and each stage of the ascent offers different views–-indeed, different understandings–-of the mountains and the clouds. As in actual mountain climbing, the distant clouds gradually become looming clouds during the ascent, until eventually the climber stands above them.

Calder in his early years was famous for his Circus, in which his playful inventiveness found fulfillment in toy-sized sculptures. In his later years, his sculpture often seemed to aspire to the monumental condition of architecture. Throughout his life, he made sculptural equivalents of fish and whales and prehistoric animals, of birds and starry constellations. Mountains and Clouds is his grand final statement of elemental themes expressed in a powerful, space-transforming invention.

== Other information ==
- The stabile elements were constructed by the Segre Iron Works of Waterbury, Connecticut, which was responsible for many of Calder's large outdoor pieces.

== See also ==
- List of Alexander Calder public works
