= Cheval Rouge =

Cheval rouge
- Artist: Alexander Calder
- Year: 1974
- Type: sculpture
- Dimensions: 500 cm × 590 cm × 590 cm (196 in × 233 in × 233 in)
- Location: National Gallery of Art Sculpture Garden; Washington, D.C.; 38.890833°N 77.023333°W
- Owner: National Gallery of Art

Cheval Rouge is an abstract sculpture by Alexander Calder.

Constructed in 1974 of painted sheet steel, it is at the National Gallery of Art Sculpture Garden.

== See also ==
- List of Alexander Calder public works
- List of public art in Washington, D.C., Ward 2
