= Beacon Theatre (New York City) =

Entertainment venue in Manhattan, New York

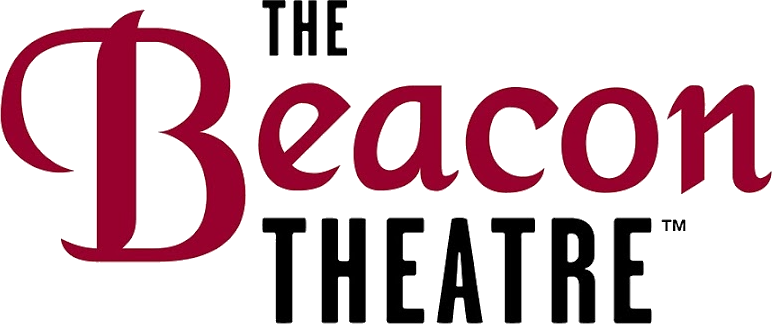

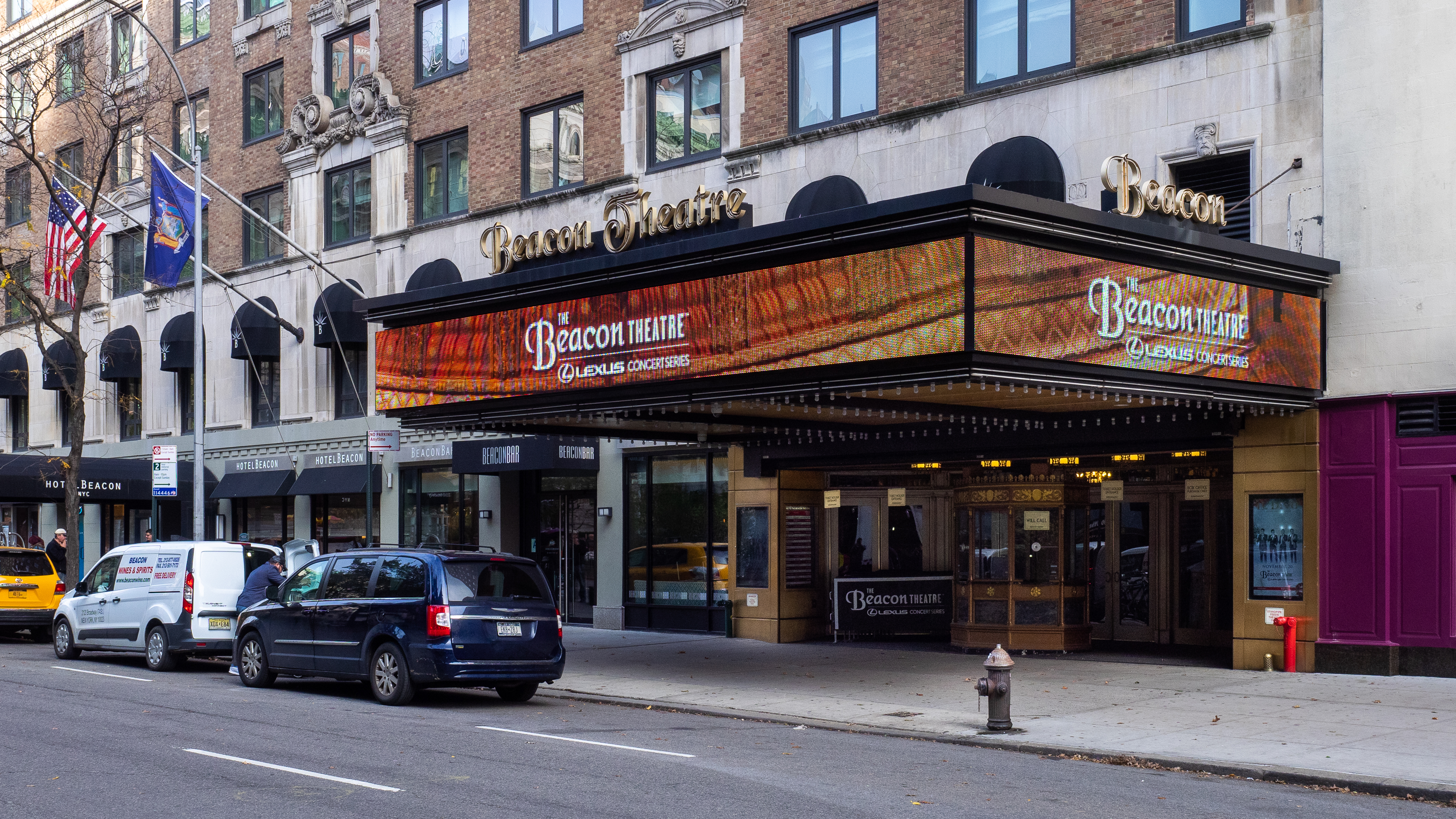
- The Beacon Theatre marquee in 2019
- Interactive map of Beacon Theatre
- Location: 2124 Broadway (at 74th Street), Manhattan, New York, U.S.
- Coordinates: 40°46′50″N 73°58′52″W
- Owner: Beacon Broadway Company
- Operator: Madison Square Garden Entertainment
- Seating type: fixed
- Capacity: 2,894
- Beacon Theater and Hotel
- U.S. National Register of Historic Places
- New York State Register of Historic Places
- New York City Landmark
- NRHP reference No.: 82001187
- NYSRHP No.: 06101.001675
- NYCL No.: 1097

Significant dates
- Added to NRHP: November 4, 1982
- Designated NYSRHP: September 30, 1982
- Designated NYCL: December 11, 1979
- Type: Indoor theater
- Public transit: Subway: 72nd Street

Construction
- Built: 1929
- Opened: December 24, 1929; 96 years ago
- Renovated: 2009
- Architect: Walter W. Ahlschlager

The Beacon Theatre is an entertainment venue at 2124 Broadway, adjacent to the Hotel Beacon, on the Upper West Side of Manhattan in New York City, United States. Opened in 1929, the Beacon Theatre was developed by Samuel "Roxy" Rothafel and built as a movie palace, with 2,894 seats across three levels. It was designed by Walter W. Ahlschlager with decorations inspired by the Renaissance, Ancient Roman, Ancient Greek, and Rococo styles. The theater is designated as a New York City interior landmark and is listed on the National Register of Historic Places.

The facade is relatively plain and is made of brick and stone, with a marquee above its entrance on Broadway. The outdoor ticket booth leads to a vestibule and a multi-story rotunda lobby under the hotel, with a mural by Danish artist Valdemar Kjoldgaard in the lobby. The auditorium is in an adjacent structure on the eastern part of the site, near 75th Street and Amsterdam Avenue. The auditorium's side walls have ornate arched doorways and murals, while the multicolored ceiling has a chandelier. The proscenium arch has Greek columns and is flanked by large statues. The orchestra pit has a Wurlitzer organ, one of three in a theater in Manhattan.

The theater was originally proposed in January 1927 as the Roxy Midway Theatre. Roxy severed his involvement and Warner Bros. took over the theater, opening it on December 24, 1929. The Central Amusement Corporation took over the Beacon in 1932, and Brandt Theatres assumed operation in 1944, running it for three decades. The theater started presenting live entertainment in 1966, and Steven Singer and Barry Kerr renovated it into a rock venue in 1974. After Singer's bankruptcy, Kazuko Hillyer turned the theater into a performing arts center in 1976. Following a failed attempt to convert the Beacon into a nightclub and restaurant in 1986, the theater remained in use as a live music and entertainment venue. Madison Square Garden Entertainment took over in 2006 and renovated the Beacon shortly afterward.

Over the years, the Beacon has hosted numerous concerts. Some acts have appeared for extended residencies, including the Allman Brothers Band. It has also hosted other types of live performances, including dance troupes and plays. The Beacon has additionally been used for broadcasts, tapings, films, and ceremonies such as the Tony Awards.

== Description ==
The Beacon Theatre is at 2124 Broadway, along the east side of the avenue between West 74th and 75th Streets, on the Upper West Side of Manhattan in New York City, United States. The theater is part of the Hotel Beacon building and was designed by Walter W. Ahlschlager for Samuel L. "Roxy" Rothafel. The Beacon's auditorium is mostly along the rear of the hotel, facing Amsterdam Avenue to the east and 75th Street to the north, although the main entrance is on Broadway to the west. The theater and hotel are near several other buildings such as The Ansonia apartments to the southwest, The Astor apartments to the northwest, and the Central Savings Bank Building to the south.

The Beacon Theatre had been designed as a miniature version of the earlier Roxy Theatre in Midtown Manhattan, which Ahlschlager also designed. Whereas the Roxy Theatre had been designed with Moorish and Renaissance-inspired elements, the Beacon contains a variety of styles, including Renaissance, Ancient Roman, Ancient Greek, and Rococo-inspired elements. Danish artist Valdemar Kjoldgaard designed numerous murals for the Beacon as well. When the theater opened, Women's Wear Daily described Kjoldgaard's murals as being "themselves worth a king's ransom". A reporter described the theater in general as "a true bit of Bagdad on Broadway", while another critic called the theater's interior "like walking into an Arab sheik's tent".

=== Facade ===
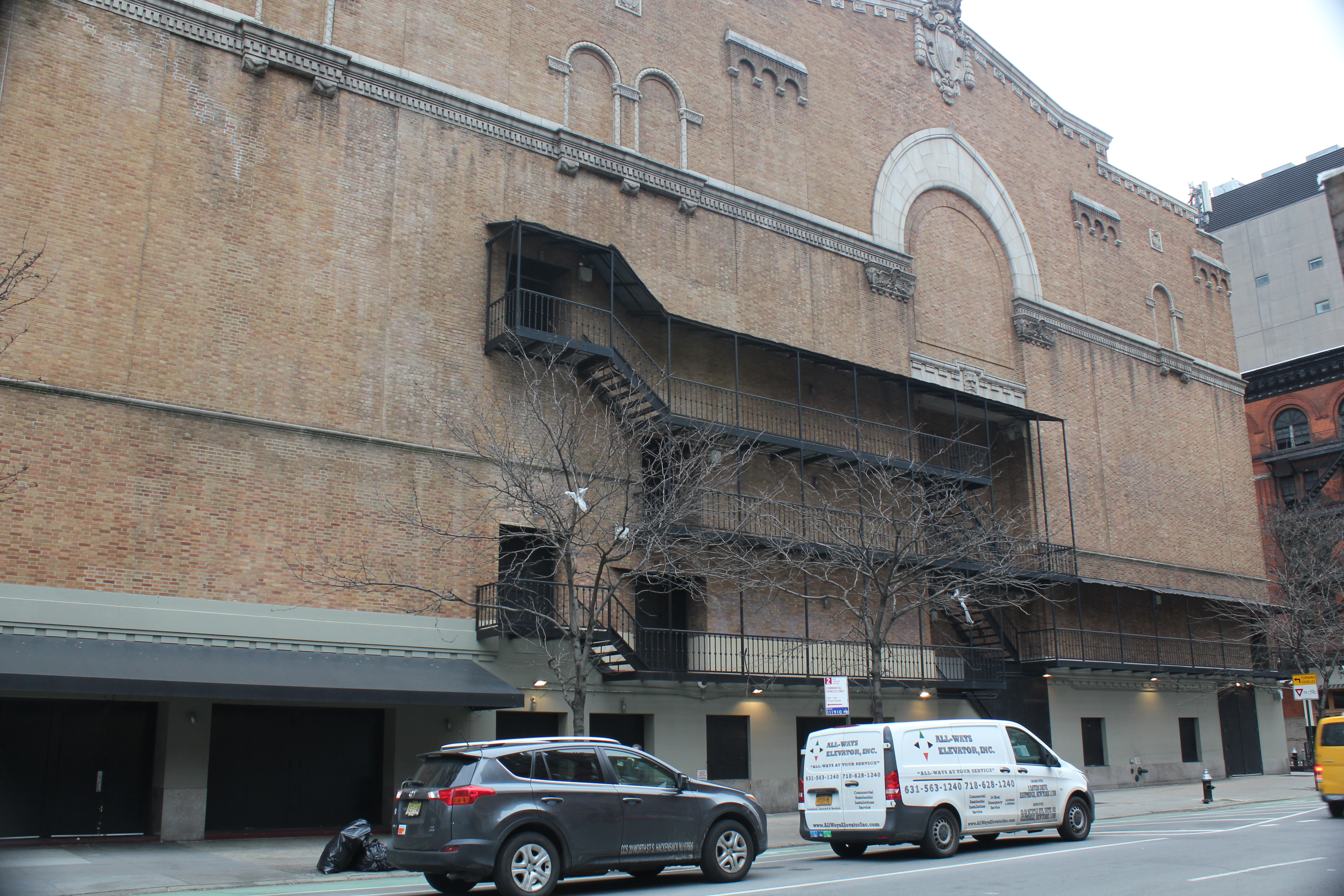
Rear facade of the Beacon Theatre on Amsterdam Avenue

The Beacon Theatre's entrance and lobby are within the hotel building, while the auditorium is in its own structure to the east. The hotel's facade is plain in design, and the theater's entrance is on the southern section of the hotel's Broadway facade. Above the theater's marquee, the hotel building contains arched windows on the second floor and a brick facade on upper stories.

The facade of the auditorium faces 75th Street and Amsterdam Avenue, where the first floor is made of stone and the upper stories are made of brick. Both facades have blind openings without any windows. There are horizontal band courses above the first and fifth floors, corresponding to those on the hotel's facade, as well as an arcade near the auditorium's roof. On 75th Street, there is a large arch at the center of the facade, with a stone frame, along with three blind arches on the fifth-story band course above it. On Amsterdam Avenue, there is a large stone-framed ogee arch at the fifth story, along with four blind arches to the sides. A stepped gable rises atop the auditorium's Amsterdam Avenue facade.

=== Interior ===
==== Lobbies ====
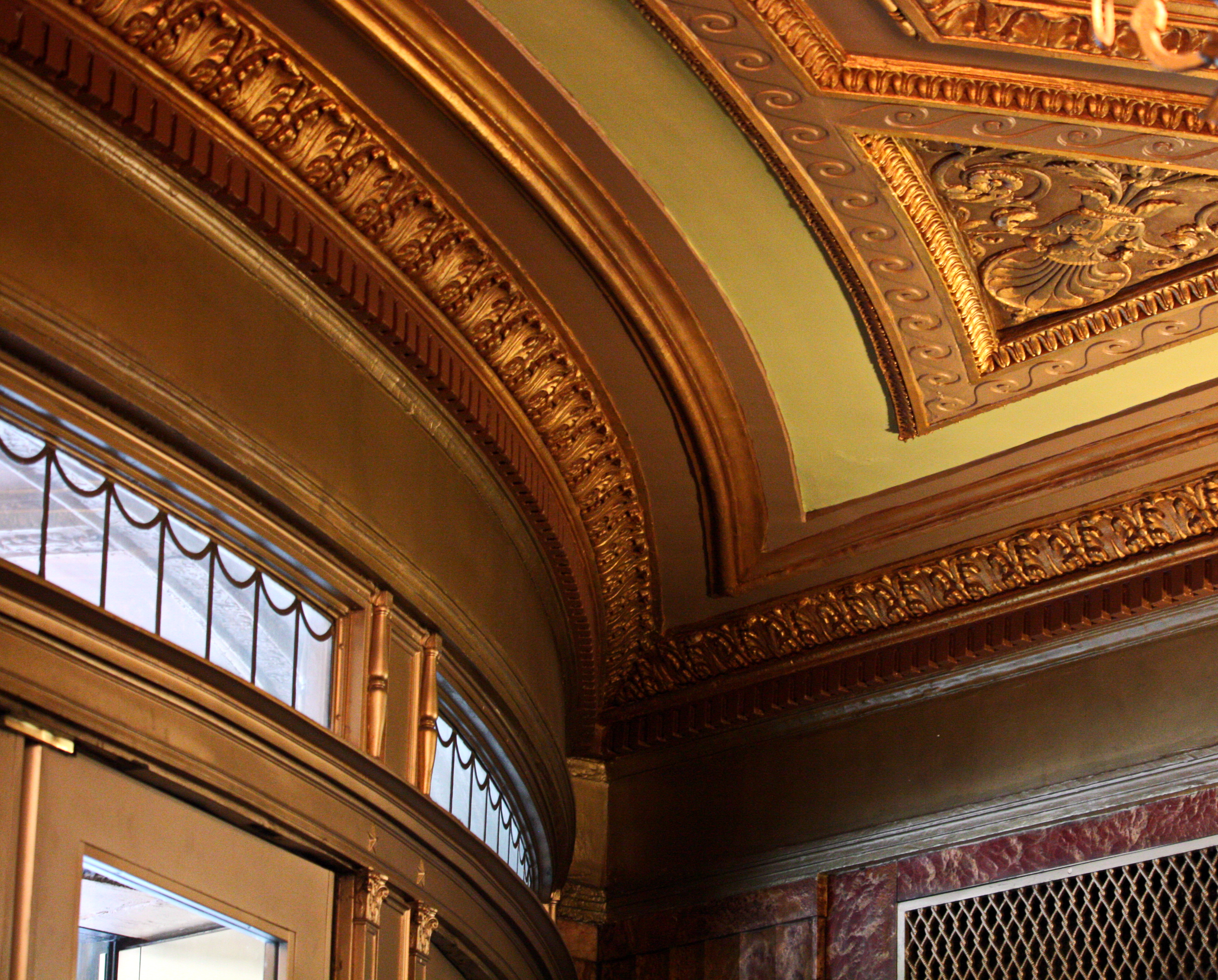
Detail of inner vestibule

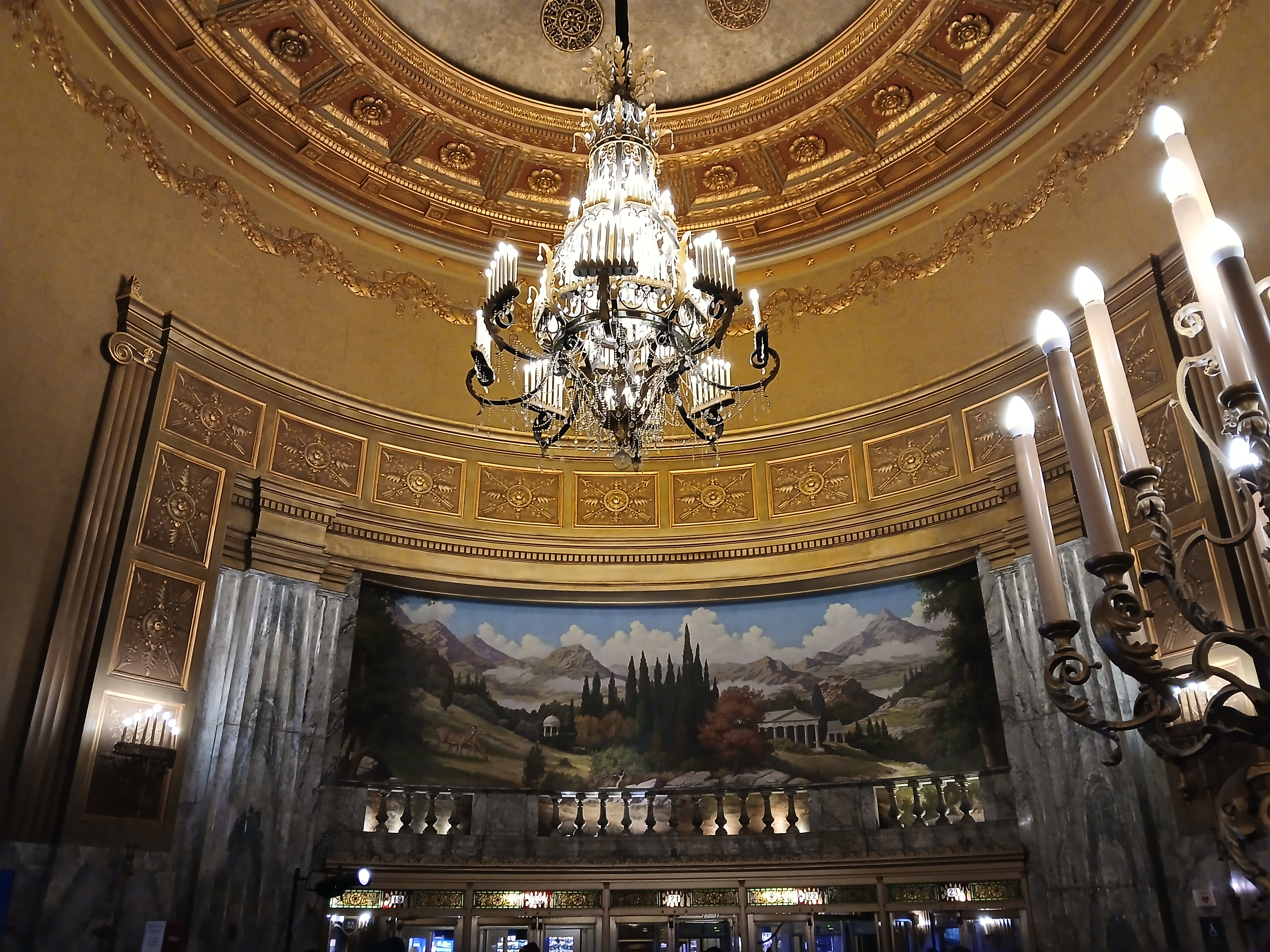
Mural by Valdemar Kjoldgaard on the rotunda's eastern wall

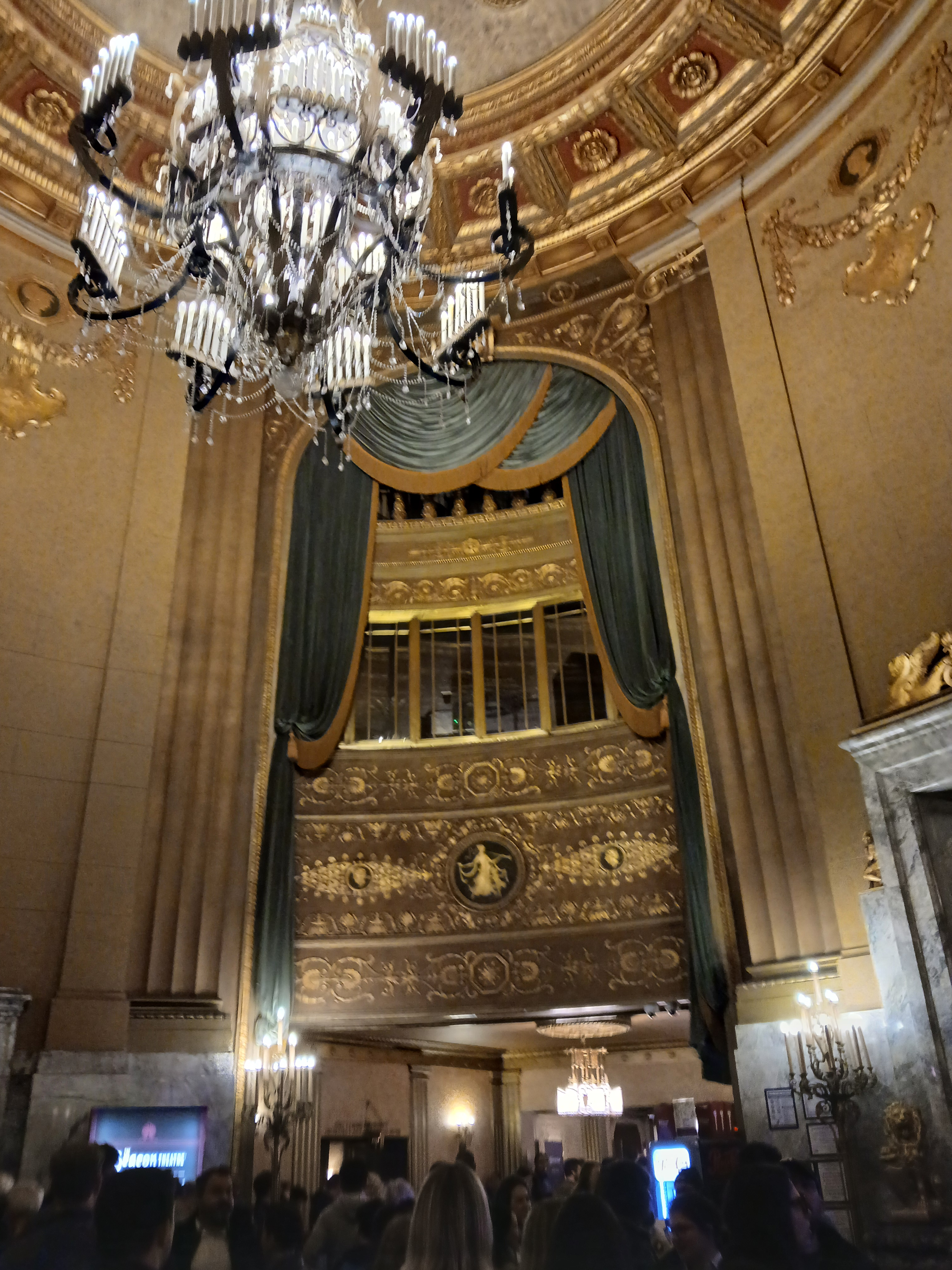
Window on the rotunda's western wall

Under the theater's marquee is a semicircular outdoor ticket lobby with tile flooring, which is recessed from the sidewalk. There is a ticket booth in the middle of the outdoor ticket lobby. The ticket booth was originally gilded and was made of marble, glass, and metal. Prior to its renovation in 2009, the ticket booth had been painted over several times. East of the outdoor ticket booth are glass and metal doors, topped by transom windows, which lead to an indoor vestibule. This vestibule has a low ceiling with lamps and Renaissance-style molded bands. The north wall contains mirrors and signs, while the south wall has another ticket booth and an office. The doors to the west (leading from the street) and to the east (leading to the main lobby) both curve into the vestibule.

East of the vestibule is a circular rotunda with Rococo-inspired decorations. The rotunda ceiling is as high as the auditorium itself; it contains moldings of rosettes and coffers, as well as a large chandelier hanging from its center. The western wall of the rotunda, which leads from the entrance vestibule, contains fluted pilasters on either side. Above the doorways is a landscape mural by Valdemar Kjoldgaard. Some time before a renovation in 2008, the mural had been covered with wallpaper, though the artwork was restored during the renovation. On the eastern wall of the rotunda is a passageway flanked by Ionic-style pilasters, which reach from the floor to the ceiling. Above the passageway is a decorative panel, as well as an archway with full-height colonettes on the mezzanine and balcony levels.

On either side of the passageway on the rotunda's eastern wall are Rococo-style stairways. The lowest flight connects to the mezzanine level. Two more flights provide access to both the bottom and the top rows of the steeply raked balcony.

==== Auditorium ====
The Beacon Theatre's auditorium

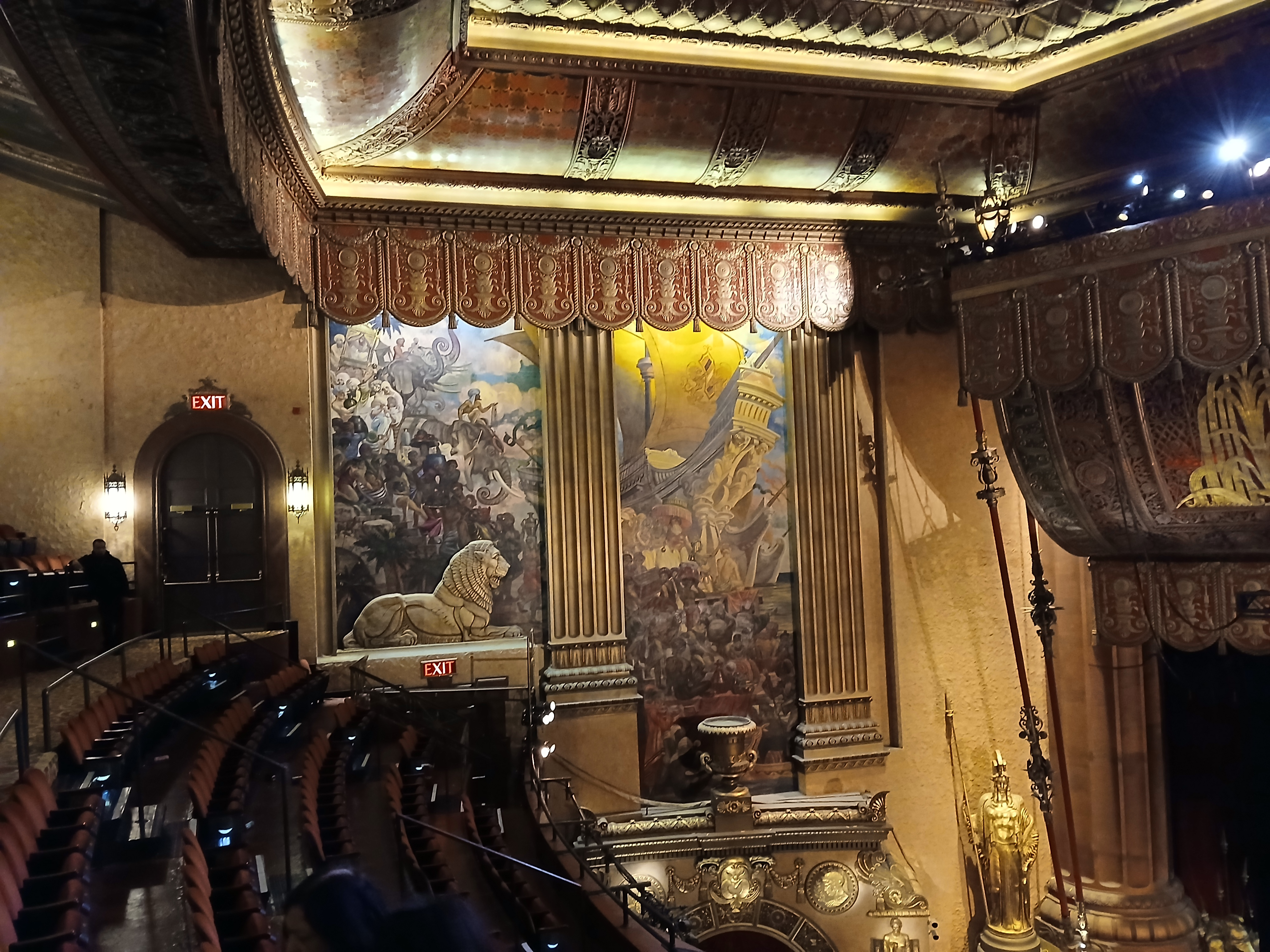
Left wall

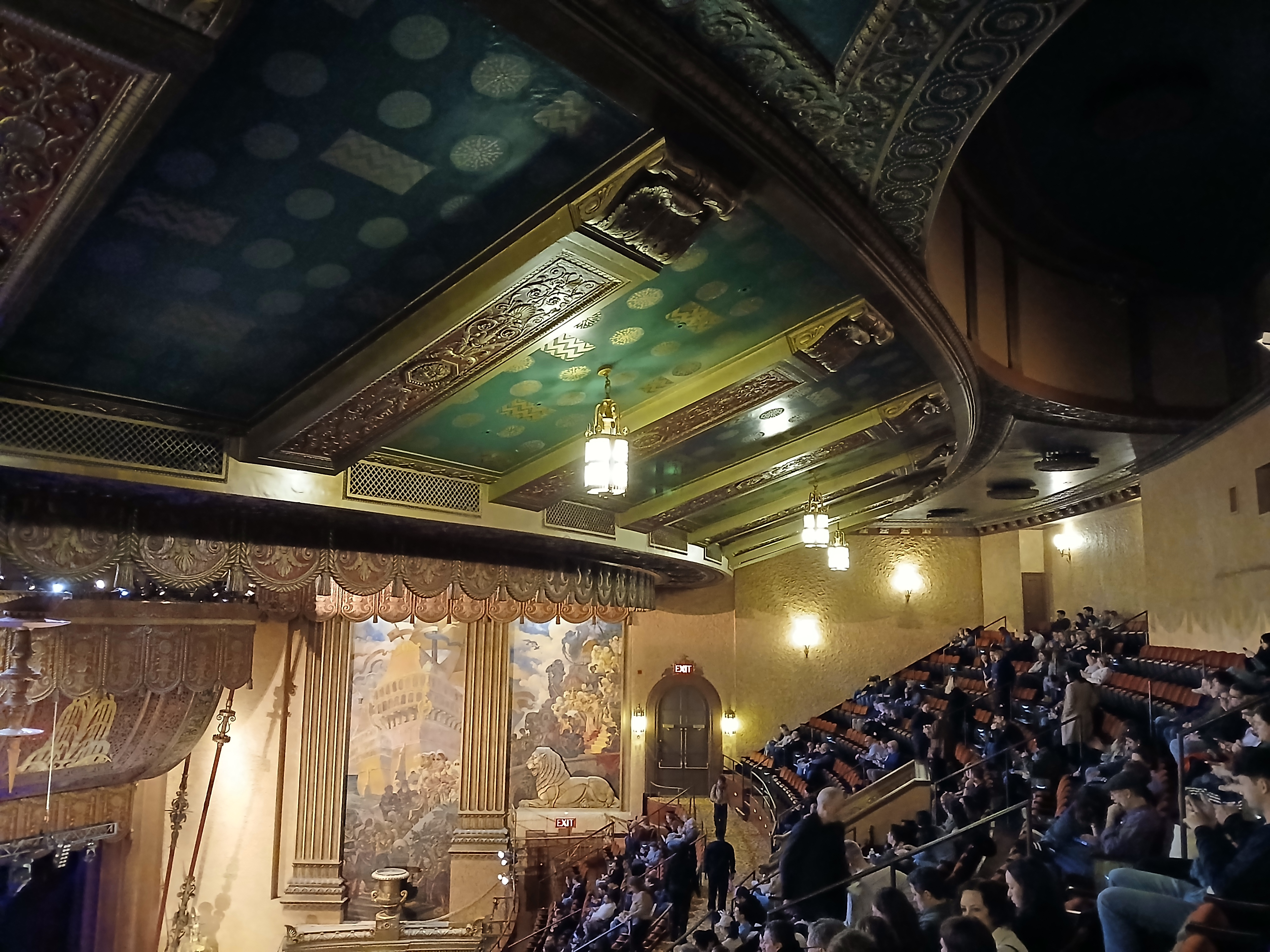
Right wall

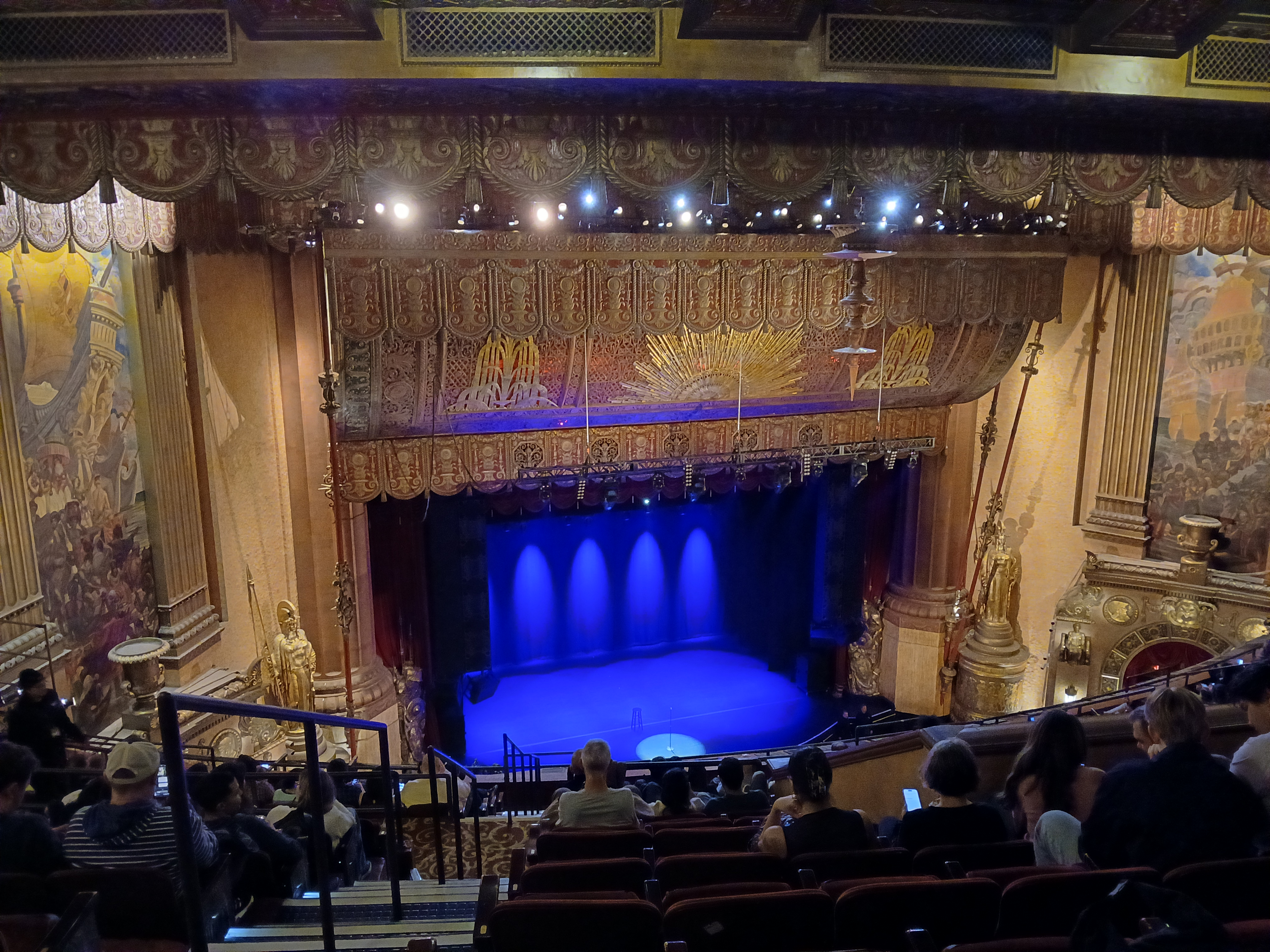
Proscenium arch

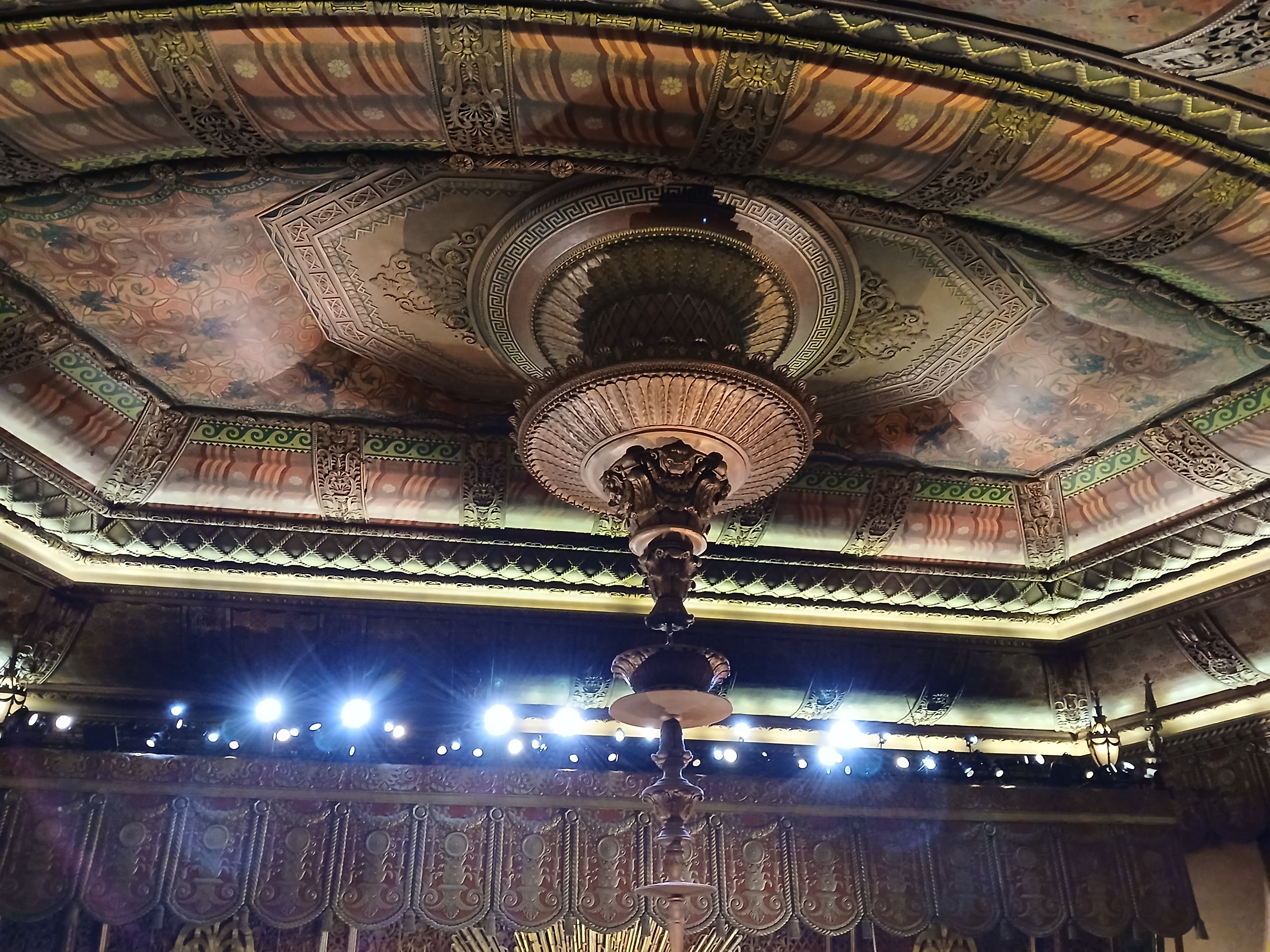
Chandelier

The auditorium has three levels of seating and a proscenium arch. The space is designed with both sculpted decorations and murals by Kjoldgaard. As of 2022, the Beacon Theatre has 2,894 seats. The theater's operator, MSG Entertainment, classifies the mezzanine level directly above the orchestra as a loge level. Two stories above the orchestra is the balcony level, which is divided into two sections: a lower balcony in the front and an upper balcony in the back. When the theater opened, there was a smoking-room balcony behind the auditorium, with ventilation ducts in the ceiling. There was also a fireproof projection booth in the rear. The original seats were characterized as "fully upholstered" folding seats with large amounts of legroom.

The side walls of the orchestra contain ornate arched doorways. Above each of the arches are theatrical masks, which are flanked by swags and cartouches. Above these arches are the balcony's side walls, which are divided into two bays by fluted pilasters. Each bay contains a piece of a mural by Kjoldgaard; according to the New York City Landmarks Preservation Commission, these represent "oriental scenes with caravans of elephants, camels, and traders". The ceiling above the front of the auditorium contains a red, gold, green, and blue color scheme and is designed to resemble the draped roof of a tent. A Venetian-style chandelier hangs from the center of the ceiling.

The proscenium arch consists of Doric-style columns on either side, supporting the top of the proscenium. The latticework of the proscenium had openings for the sound coming from the theater's organ. Flanking the proscenium are bronze female figures, which measure 30 ft-tall (9.1 m) and depict Greek goddesses. Women's Wear Daily described these figures as "heroic-size bronzes of Amazons with spear and shield". Above the proscenium are green and gold plaster draperies. The theater originally had a curtain that contemporary media described as the only "contour curtain" in a movie theater in the United States.

The Beacon also retains its original Wurlitzer organ in its orchestra pit. The organ was manufactured in 1928 and contains four manuals and 19 ranks. The Beacon is one of three theaters in Manhattan that retains its original organ, along with Radio City Music Hall and the United Palace. The organ was abandoned by the early 1960s, but it was not removed because the removal cost was too high for the theater's operators. The organ was restored in 1967 and remained in use at the Beacon until it was sealed in 2009.

==== Elevator ====
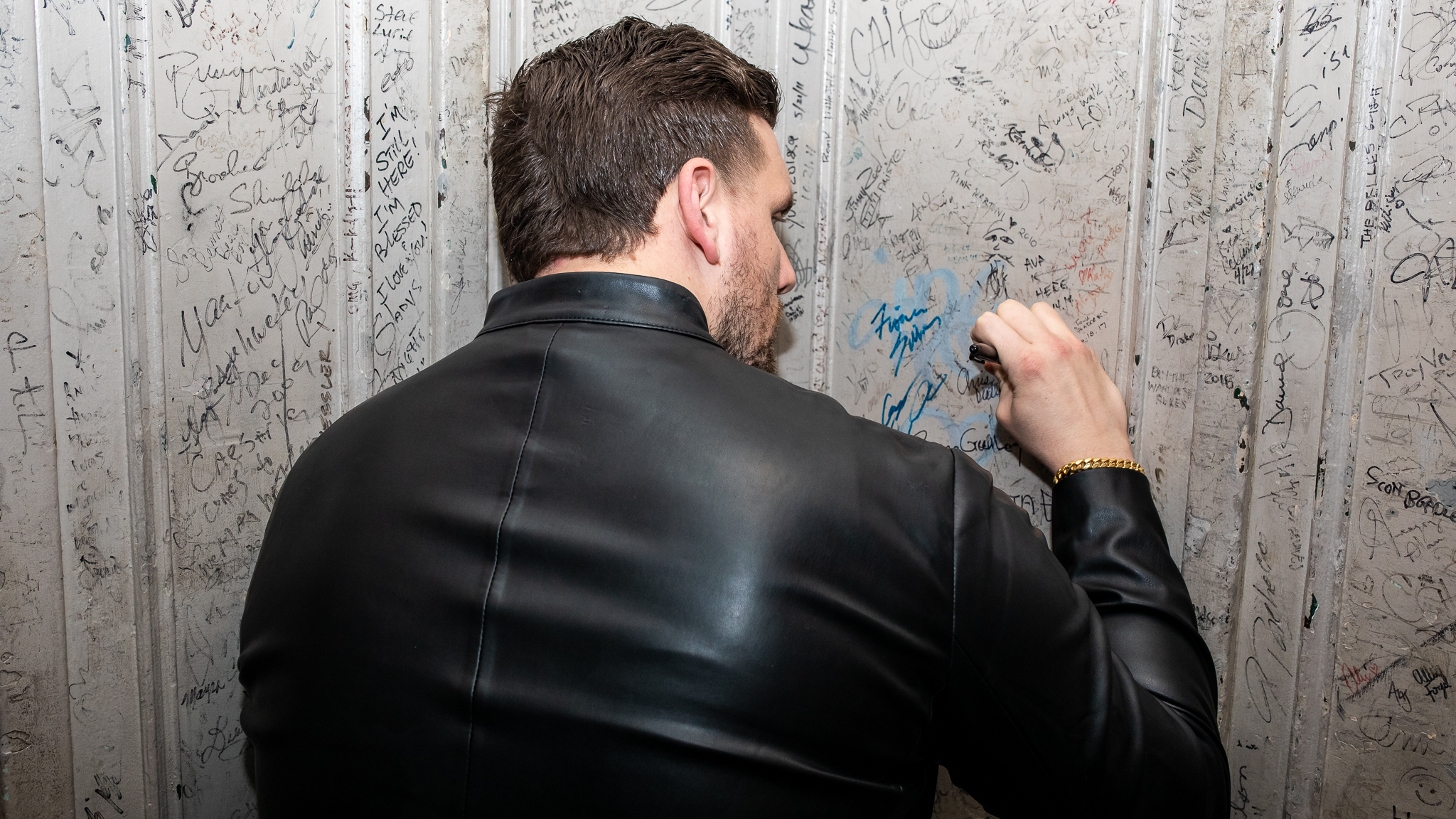
Comedian Chris Distefano signs the Beacon Theatre elevator in 2022.

Since 2007, more than 2,000 performers have been encouraged to sign their name on the walls of an elevator inside the venue. Signers include Jerry Seinfeld, Bono, Amy Poehler and Tina Fey, Dan and Phil, Trevor Noah, Ben Schwartz, and Eddie Vedder. There are a total of three stage elevators inside the venue: one for the main stage, one for the orchestra pit and one for the Wurlitzer organ.

== History ==
Movie palaces became common in the 1920s, between the end of World War I and the beginning of the Great Depression. In the New York City area, only a small number of operators were involved in the construction of movie palaces. These theaters' designers included the architects Walter Ahlschlager, Thomas W. Lamb, C. Howard Crane, and John Eberson. Samuel "Roxy" Rothafel was a successful theater operator who was prominent in the city's movie theater industry, having built the 5,920-seat Roxy Theatre on 50th Street in midtown during 1927. The Chanin brothers also had some experience in theatrical development, having built six Broadway theaters in the mid-1920s. (Note: These Broadway theaters are now the Richard Rodgers Theatre, Brooks Atkinson Theatre, Samuel J. Friedman Theatre, Bernard B. Jacobs Theatre, John Golden Theatre, and Majestic Theatre.)

=== Movie palace ===
==== Development and opening ====
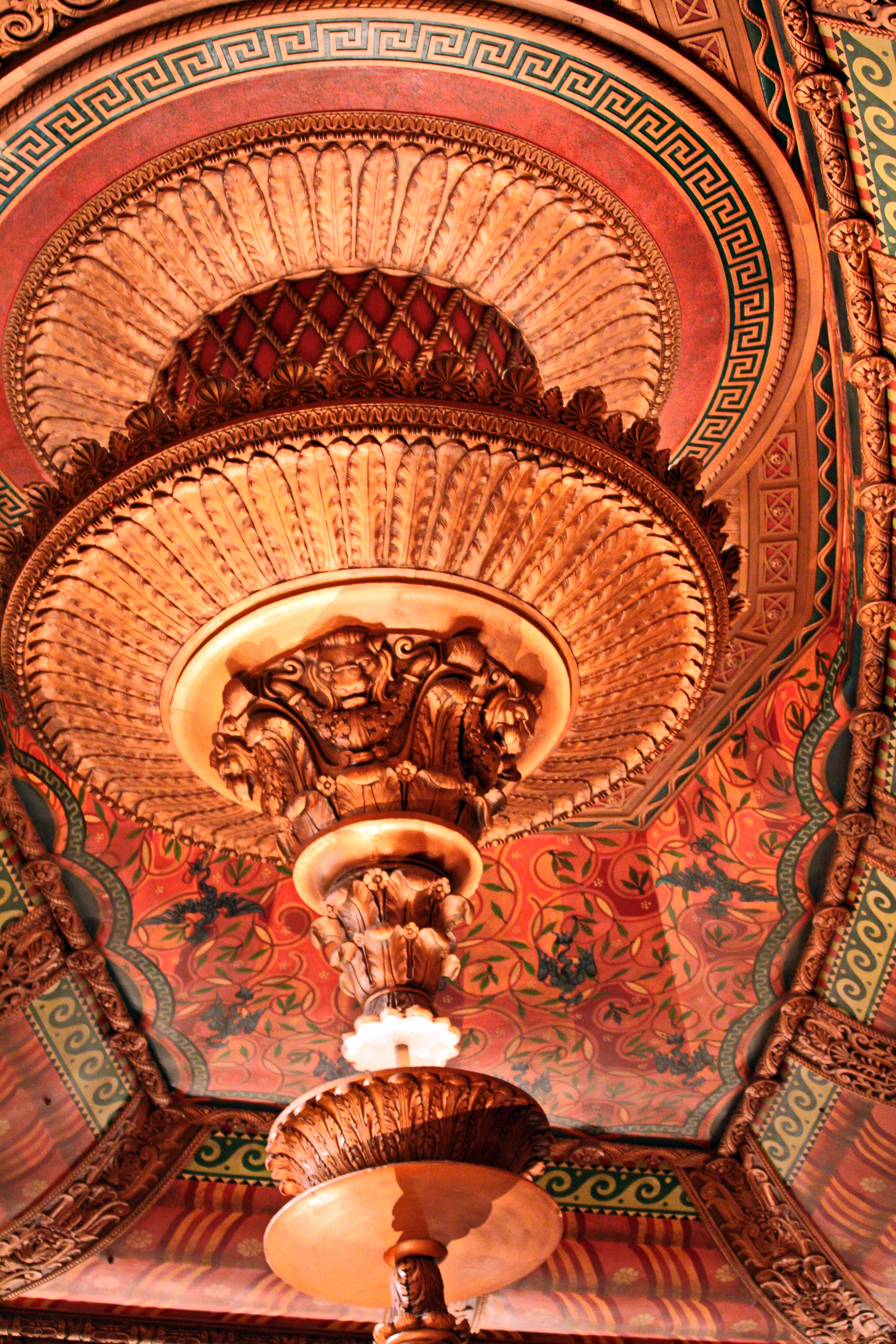
Chandelier inside the auditorium

The Chanins acquired a site on 75th Street between Broadway and Amsterdam Avenue in 1925 for the construction of a hotel and an attached theater. Two years later, in January 1927, the Chanins sold the site to the Havemeyer Construction Company. Film producer Herbert Lubin negotiated the sale on behalf of Roxy, who would operate the theater on the site, known as the Roxy Midway Theatre. Roxy retained Ahlschlager to design the new hotel and theater, and the Chanins were hired as the consulting engineers for the project. The sale came one month after Lubin established the Roxy Circuit, which planned to operate numerous movie theaters in New York City, with the midtown Roxy Theatre as its flagship. In April 1928, S. W. Straus & Company underwrote a $4.45 million loan on the Midway project, which at the time was nearly completed. An airway beacon was placed on top of the hotel, and the project was renamed the Midway Beacon, a name that was kept as late as June 1928.

The Roxy Circuit never operated the Midway Theatre because, in July 1928, the company sued to get out of its lease. None of the other planned theaters in the Roxy Circuit were ever built, in part because of the start of the Great Depression shortly afterward. The New York Herald Tribune was using the "Beacon" name exclusively by June 1929. At the time, Warner Theatres was considering acquiring the theater, which had been completed for a year but was unused. After RKO Pictures considered leasing the Beacon, Warner Theatres ultimately bought the theater in November 1929, turning it into a first-run showcase for Warner Bros. films on the Upper West Side. Warner Theatres then conducted changes to the acoustical properties of the auditorium to accommodate sound films. Warner Bros. unsuccessfully attempted to obtain the rights to screen First National Pictures films at the new Beacon. The renamed Warner's Beacon Theatre opened on December 24, 1929, with the talking picture Tiger Rose featuring Lupe Vélez.

==== Film screenings ====
Originally, the Beacon played one motion picture per week, which ran continuously from 11:30 a.m. to 11:30 p.m. Among the early films screened at the Beacon were Once a Gentleman (1930), A Soldier's Plaything (1931), and The Lawless Woman (1931). The Chanins took over the Beacon Hotel and Theatre in April 1930, four months after the theater had opened. Amid speculation that the Chanins might redevelop the site (in the past eleven years, the brothers had torn down every structure that they had bought), Irwin Chanin announced that the Beacon Hotel and Theatre would remain operational. The Beacon Enterprise Company, in which Warner Bros. owned 75 percent of the stock, was subsequently recorded as having leased the theater. The Beacon was one of several movie theaters that Warner Bros. operated along Broadway; the others included the Warners, Hollywood, Winter Garden, and Strand.

At the end of January 1932, Warner Bros.' operating lease on the Beacon Theatre expired, and the Central Amusement Corporation took over. The Chanins said the new management allowed the Beacon to show movies from more than one producer. The Beacon largely continued to produce straight pictures, but it also broadened its offerings to radio broadcasts, such as Tru Blu Beer's Broadway Bandwagon in 1935. To recruit soldiers during World War II, the United States Army exhibited a mortar and a machine gun in the Beacon's rotunda lobby while playing a short film in the auditorium. The theater also hosted bond-buying events during the war. Brandt Theatres acquired the Beacon in 1944 as the 120th theater in its chain. Two years later, the Beacon began presenting films and stage performances for children during Saturday matinees.

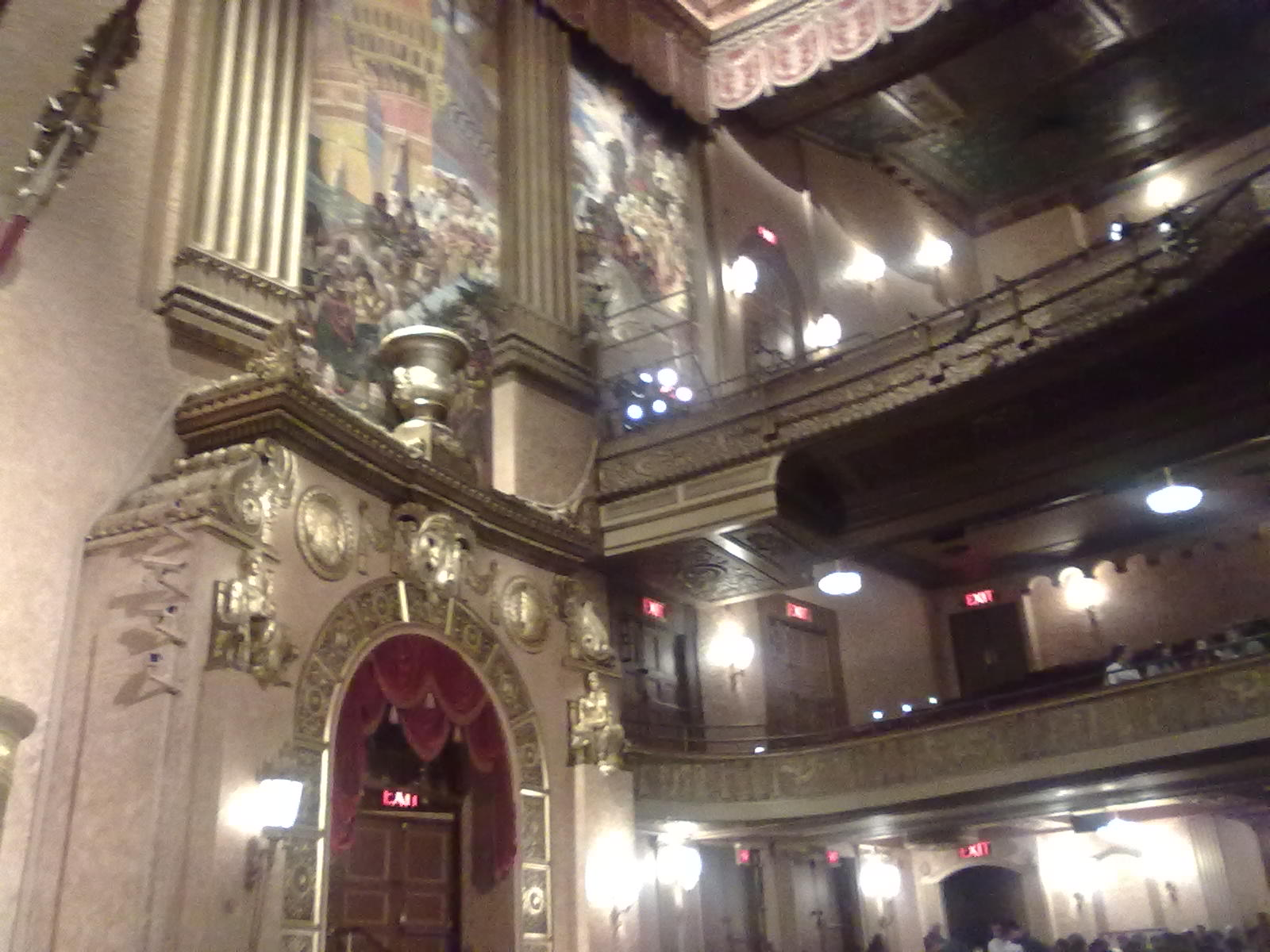
Right wall of auditorium as viewed from the stage

The Beacon implemented a policy of presenting only first runs at the end of 1948; the British picture Don't Take It to Heart was the first to be screened under this policy. During 1949, the films shown under this policy included double features such as Easy Money/My Brother's Keeper, as well as traditional single features like A Yank Comes Back and Temptation Harbour. The Beacon continued to show double features throughout the 1950s, such as The Frightened Bride/The Caretaker's Daughter in 1953. The Beacon also screened Warner Bros. films. This caused a dispute in 1959, when the owners of the nearby Embassy Theatre filed a lawsuit, alleging that Warner Bros. had shown favoritism by selling distribution rights for three films to the Beacon rather than to the high bidders, the Embassy. Starting in 1962, the Beacon also showed United Artists pictures through the UA's "Premiere Showcase"; the first film shown under this program was Hong Kong.

In January 1966, Brandt announced that the Beacon would present legitimate plays along with films. The first live show under this policy, a Yiddish vaudeville show, was canceled after two days. The next year, members of the American Association of Theatre Organ Enthusiasts restored the Beacon's long-unused organ. The Beacon then screened silent pictures accompanied by organ music, starting with The General. By then, Boxoffice magazine characterized the Beacon as one of the Upper West Side's few movie palaces that remained in theatrical use. The Beacon also continued to screen motioin pictures such as Ulysses, as well as live shows including a ballet production in 1968. The Beacon implemented a "first second run" policy in 1971, showing reruns of films that had just premiered (as opposed to reruns that had already been shown at other theaters). Accordingly, the Beacon reduced its ticket prices to $1.00–1.50, even as its competitors retained higher ticket prices. (Note: Before this change, ticket prices on Monday through Thursday were $2, while ticket prices on Friday and weekends were $2.50. The Embassy had the same price scale, which remained unchanged after the Beacon's policy changed.) Though the reduced ticket prices increased the theater's income by 15 to 20 percent, the Beacon's owners were looking to sell the theater.

=== Conversion into live venue ===
==== Early live shows ====
Following the closure of rock venue Fillmore East, Bow Wow Productions proposed hosting rock concerts at the Beacon in 1971. The concert series began later that year, and the theater charged ticket prices of up to $7.50 on these shows. The Beacon's concerts in 1971 tended not to have long runs due to disagreements between promoters and the theater's operators. By the early 1970s, the theater was still showing movies but was dimly lit and deteriorating. In March 1974, the Beacon was leased by Vidicoth Systems, (Note: Sometimes spelled Vidicom) a company operated by Steven Singer and Barry Kerr. The new operators spent $250,000 on renovations, including $75,000 on a new sound system. The operators reupholstered the seats, installed new carpets, and repainted the ceiling and statues. The theater continued to show movies until the renovations were finished.

When the Beacon reopened in October 1974, Stephen Metz took over the theater's bookings, using the Beacon primarily for rock concerts. A writer for Newsday said of the Beacon: "A rock ballroom is not just what Manhattan needs, but that may be what it's getting." By the next year, the Beacon had gained a reputation as a rock venue. A New York Amsterdam News reporter said in 1976 that the Beacon "has transcended a galaxy of live-entertainment theaters" and had become a competitor to the Apollo Theater in Harlem. Some residents raised complaints about the noise and crowds at the rock concerts, though Singer and Metz addressed most of these complaints. Singer and Metz formed a firm in August 1976, Singmet, which produced some of its own shows for the Beacon. The theater was closed in 1976 after Singer and Metz went bankrupt, and it was planned to be replaced by a supermarket.

Kazuko Hillyer announced plans in February 1977 to convert the Beacon into a performing arts center. Hillyer, a Japanese-American, said she wanted to make the theater "a center for the two heritages we all have". Hillyer immediately booked dance shows for the Beacon, and she intended to spend $75,000 on renovations. The same year, Concert Arts Society was recorded as having leased the theater for 15 years. The New York City Landmarks Preservation Commission (LPC) designated the Beacon Theatre as an interior landmark on December 11, 1979, citing the theater's "dramatic effects of rich ornamental details". 50/50 Productions, a company operated by Steve Martin, took over the Beacon's bookings in October 1981 and booked jazz and contemporary musicians for the theater. Martin wanted to stage Broadway shows at the theater, but he faced competition from the Shubert Organization and the Nederlander Organization, the two largest operators of Broadway theaters. The Beacon was renovated in 1982, and it was added to the National Register of Historic Places the same year. The theater was renovated again in 1985.

==== Failed conversion into nightclub ====
Andy Feltz became the Beacon's manager in 1986. That February, the theater's owners announced plans to convert the Beacon into a nightclub and restaurant with a discotheque. At the time, the Beacon was the only mid-sized live-concert venue in Manhattan; the two other similarly sized venues in the borough, Avery Fisher Hall and Carnegie Hall, were largely used for classical music. The operator of the planned nightclub, Olivier Coquelin, said he and his architect Charles A. Platt (a former LPC commissioner) had chosen the Beacon Theatre for conversion specifically because of its landmark status. Coquelin's company signed a seven-year lease for the theater that April. The nightclub would be built as a freestanding structure within the auditorium, thus reducing the need to modify the protected interior spaces. Area residents expressed concerns that the renovations would damage the landmarked design features. Preservationists and community groups, including the Committee to Save the Beacon Theatre, organized in opposition to the plans.

The LPC voted to approve the plan in July 1986. Afterward, Coquelin said he would need to spend $3 million to renovate the theater because of its deteriorated condition. The city rejected the conversion proposal that December because the planned dance floor was too large under zoning regulations. The city government approved the plan after the dance floor's size was reduced. Two benefit concerts were hosted to fund the groups that opposed the theater's conversion. In September 1987, a New York Supreme Court judge overturned the LPC's approval of the conversion on the grounds that it would threaten the quality of the theater's architecture. During this time, the Beacon was still hosting concerts; along with the Apollo, it was one of two venues in Manhattan with frequent rock, pop, and soul concerts. The theater's operators filed an appeal of the Supreme Court's ruling in October 1988. The New York Court of Appeals overturned the Supreme Court decision, sending the plan back to the LPC.

==== Continued use as live venue ====
By 1989, the theater's operators no longer intended to turn the theater into a nightclub, having hired MSG Entertainment as the theater's exclusive booking agent for several years. The Committee to Save the Beacon Theatre expressed optimism but continued to monitor the theater's usage. Following the efforts of the Committee to Save the Beacon Theatre, Nanci Callahan founded the West Side Cultural Center, which was to stage children's programming, dances, and operas at the Beacon. In late 1991, the Beacon was temporarily converted into an IMAX theater; the IMAX format's large screen necessitated that most of the seats be closed off due to poor sightlines. The theater was then refurbished again in the early 1990s for rock concerts.

Feltz continued to manage the Beacon until 2006. That November, the theater was leased for 20 years to MSG Entertainment's parent company Cablevision, which also leased Radio City Music Hall and owned Madison Square Garden. Cablevision committed at least $10 million toward a future restoration of the Beacon, which closed for a major renovation in August 2007. Beyer Blinder Belle was hired for the project, fixing longstanding issues such as a leaking roof and damage to original decorations. The restoration also involved replacing the electrical system, upholstering the seats, restoring decorations in the lobby and the auditorium, and upgrading backstage functions. The workers restored features such as the Broadway ticket booth, which had been painted over numerous times, and the chandelier above the auditorium, which had been hanging from a coffee tin. The project involved 1,000 workers and was completed in February 2009 for $16 million.

MSG Entertainment split from Cablevision in mid-2009 but continued to operate the Beacon Theatre and its other venues. The Beacon's lighting system was upgraded in 2014 to accommodate the venue's events, which at the time included concerts, comedy, broadcasts, and film screenings. For over a year, from early 2020 to July 2021, the Beacon Theatre was temporarily closed due to the COVID-19 pandemic. A new sound system was installed at the Beacon in August 2022.

== Entertainment ==
After the Beacon Theatre started presenting live performances, it became one of the most popular concert halls in New York City. In addition, it has hosted other types of live events such as comedy specials. By 2006, the theater hosted about 70 performances a year; box-office figures were available for 52 of these events, which collectively grossed $8 million and had 136,000 total patrons. During the Beacon's 2008 renovation, The New York Times referred to the venue as the "Carnegie Hall of rock rooms".

=== Concerts ===
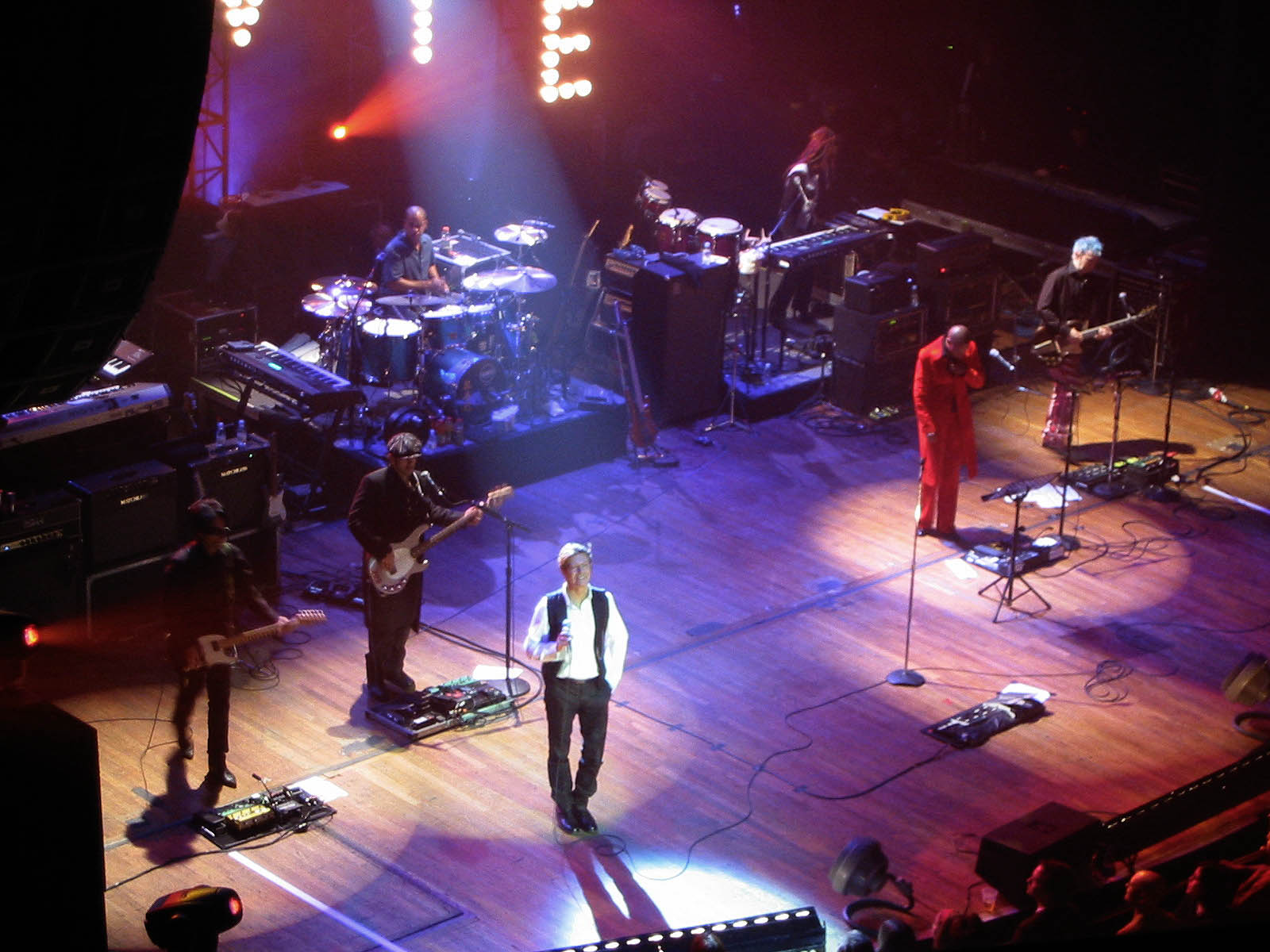
David Bowie Heathen Tour at the Beacon Theatre, 2002

The theater has long hosted R&B, pop, and jam bands and rock concerts. Early in the Beacon's history as a venue for live show, it hosted concert appearances such as those of rock band Steve Miller Band, blues singer Dr. John, soul singer Wilson Pickett, and pop singer Tina Turner. When the theater was briefly used as a rock venue in the mid-1970s, several rock bands had appearances at the Beacon, including Supertramp, Queen (as part of their A Night at the Opera Tour), Grateful Dead, and Return to Forever. Additional concerts in the 1970s included a three-night appearance by singer Carole King in 1976. After Kazuko Hillyer took over in 1977, she moved her Coffee Concerts to the Beacon from Alice Tully Hall. Under Hillyer's operation, the theater also hosted acts such as Canadian Brass and Peter Schickele in 1978.

Among the Beacon's concert bookings in the early 1980s were those by jazz trumpeter Miles Davis, R&B singer Millie Jackson, bluegrass acts Osborne Brothers and Jim & Jesse, and jazz musicians Sarah Vaughan and Zoot Sims. Other acts during the decade included gospel singers Al Green and Shirley Caesar, pop musician Laurie Anderson, pop/jazz guitarist Earl Klugh, juju singer King Sunny Adé, electronic group OMD, and jazz singer Cab Calloway. In the early 1990s, the Beacon hosted such musical offerings as folk-rock duo Indigo Girls, a rock-and-soul revue, a concert with several country performers, singer Tracy Chapman, pop rock band Crowded House, and gospel singers BeBe Winans and CeCe Winans. The latter half of the decade saw appearances by performers including rock musician Ian Anderson, jazz tenor Sonny Rollins, Italian blues singer Zucchero Fornaciari, as well as a classical music concert.

Concert performances continued in the early 2000s, including those by singer Liza Minnelli, the Wynton Marsalis Septet, singers Norah Jones and Gillian Welch, rock band Radiohead, and blues musician Bonnie Raitt. Paul Simon gave the first performances at the Beacon after it reopened in 2009, and Leonard Cohen performed the same year. In the 2010s, the Beacon's performers have included Goldfrapp, Fiona Apple, Cat Stevens, Nick Mason's Saucerful of Secrets, The Tragically Hip, and Coldplay. The Beacon's performers in the 2020s included the Trey Anastasio Band (which led a series of virtual concerts during the COVID-19 pandemic) and Bono.

==== Residencies ====
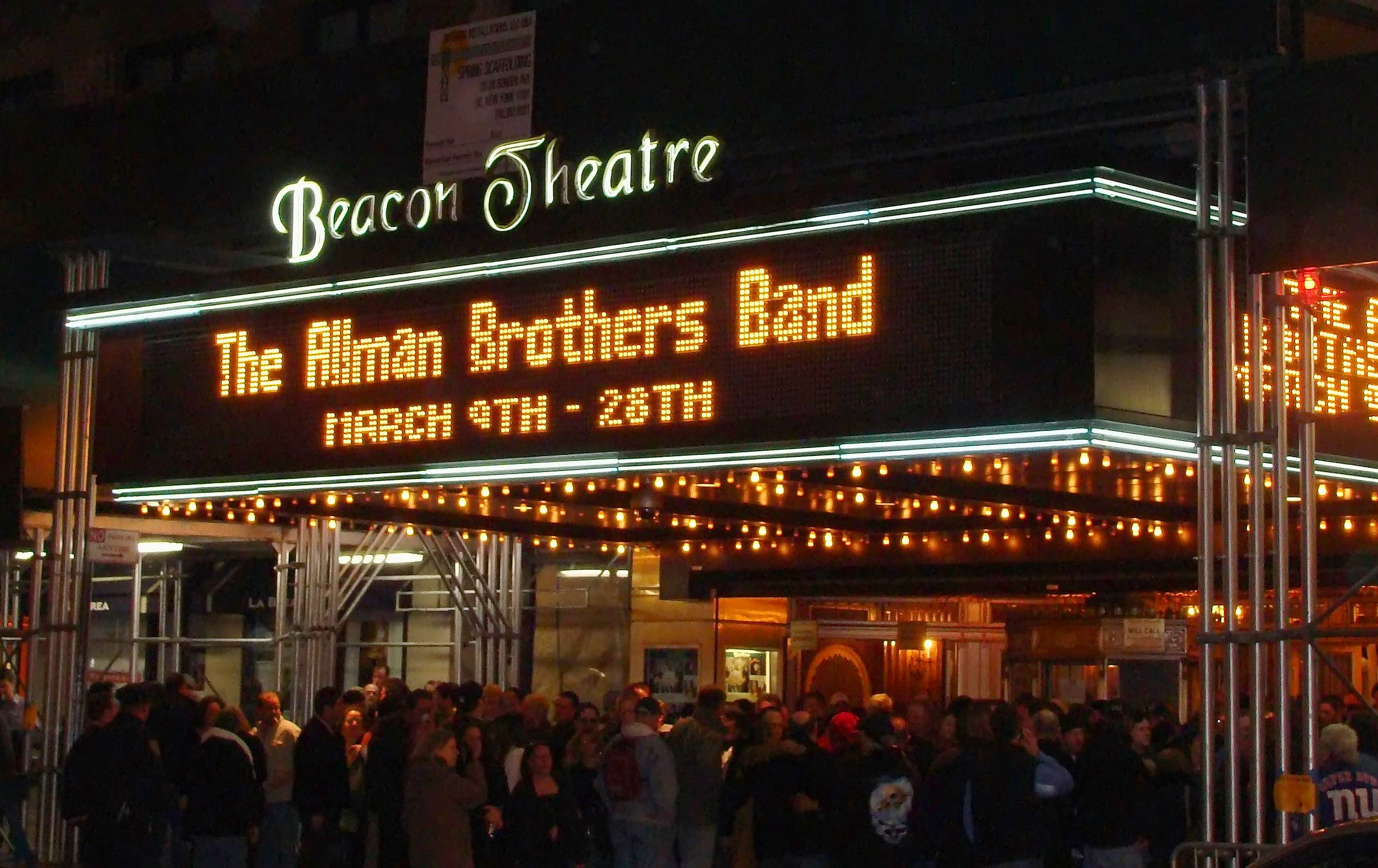
The Allman Brothers Band opening night in 2009, celebrating its 40th anniversary at the Beacon

The rock band the Allman Brothers Band was at one point the most frequent performer at the Beacon, appearing there nearly every year from 1989 to 2014. After their first performance in 1989, the band returned in 1992 1994, and annually after 1996; a New York Times article in 2002 called the band's performances "as sure a sign of spring as the reappearance of robins and bellybuttons". The band recorded a live album at the theater in March 2000, releasing Peakin' at the Beacon that November. In 2009, the Allman Brothers Band celebrated its 40th anniversary at the Beacon with shows dedicated to the band's founder and original frontman, Duane Allman. The band could not perform at the Beacon in 2010 because the theater was hosting an extended run of a Cirque du Soleil production, but the band was invited back in 2011. The band played the final show of its career at the Beacon Theatre on October 28, 2014, after 238 total concerts at the theater.

Other bands and musicians have also had residencies at the Beacon. The band Hot Tuna performed annually through the 1990s and 2000s, and rock band Steely Dan has also had many residencies at the theater. From 2014 to 2017, singer Mariah Carey hosted her annual residency All I Want for Christmas Is You: A Night of Joy and Festivity at the Beacon, featuring songs from her Christmas albums Merry Christmas and Merry Christmas II You alongside some of her biggest hits. The first leg of Carey's residency commenced in December 2014, followed by performances in 2015, 2016, and 2017. Bob Dylan has also had numerous annual residencies at the Beacon Theatre, and guitarist Trey Anastasio performed an eight-week virtual residency called "The Beacon Jams" in late 2020.

=== Other live appearances ===
The first live show in the Beacon's modern history was the Yiddish vaudeville Bagels & Yox, which closed after two days in 1967. The Beacon hosted a performance of Erik Satie's symphonic drama Socrate in 1967, in tribute to the mobile artist Alexander Calder, featuring a recreation of Calder's set for a 1936 production of the work. During the early 1970s, the Beacon featured weekly professional wrestling matches. When the Beacon operated as a performing arts center in the late 1970s, it hosted appearances by dance companies such as the Alwin Nikolais Dance Theatre, the Murray Louis Dance Company, the Grand Kabuki troupe of Japan, and a festival called "Ballet at the Beacon". During that era, the Beacon also hosted another performance of Socrate alongside the opera Four Saints in Three Acts, as well as an Elizabeth Swados musical with a cast composed entirely of children.

In the early 1980s, the Beacon continued to host dance and musical performances, including the National Dance Company of Senegal, an annual Hasidic Song Festival, the Guangdong Yue Opera, and a production of the opera cycle Der Ring des Nibelungen. Michaele Vollbracht held a fashion show at the Beacon in 1982, although the theater's stage was poorly equipped to host such events. Near the end of the decade, the theater also hosted the melodrama 1000 Airplanes on the Roof. Live performances in the 1990s included a production of the musical The Wiz with an all-Black cast in 1993 and a comedy routine by Sandra Bernhard in 1994. The 14th Dalai Lama also gave two series of lectures at the Beacon in 1999 and 2003.

The Beacon continued to host plays, musicals, and other live acts in the 21st century. These included the children's musical Questionable Quest in 2000; Tyler Perry's play Madea Goes to Jail in 2005; and Perry's off-Broadway drama The Marriage Counselor in 2009. Cirque du Soleil staged the short-lived vaudeville-based show Banana Shpeel at the Beacon in 2010, and the musical The Lightning Thief had performances at the Beacon before opening on Broadway in 2019. In addition, in the 2010s and 2020s, the theater has hosted comedy shows by Jerry Seinfeld, Ali Wong, and John Oliver and Seth Meyers.

=== Recordings and broadcasts ===
The theater's stage has hosted a variety of broadcasts and films. For example, VH1 broadcast its popular production Divas Live from there in 1998 and 1999. Many of George Carlin's HBO comedy specials were broadcast from or filmed at the Beacon, including You Are All Diseased (1999). Conan O'Brien taped his Late Night 10th anniversary special at the theater in 2003, and O'Brien briefly returned in late 2011 to tape shows for his series Conan.

Some of the concerts at the Beacon have been taped as well. Duran Duran recorded a live concert at the Beacon on August 31, 1987, called Live at the Beacon Theatre. The theater was also used in late 2006 for the filming of Shine a Light, a film of a live concert by the Rolling Stones. Joan Baez celebrated her 75th birthday with a concert at the theater on January 27, 2016, which was broadcast on PBS's Great Performances and released on CD and DVD. She also included the theater in her worldwide Fare Thee Well tour with three concerts in September 2018 and in May 2019.

Even after being converted into a live-performance venue in the 1970s, the Beacon still occasionally hosted film screenings. These included a series of Cuban films in 1978, a marathon run of Russian films in 1979, and a "worst-film festival" in 1980. The theater also hosted a silent-film festival in 1985, accompanied by music from the organ, as well as the film Koyaanisqatsi with a live accompaniment in 1988. The Beacon was temporarily converted to an IMAX theater for the screening of the film Stones at the Max in 1991. Some film screenings continued at the Beacon through the 21st century, such as the film Walk the Line in 2005 and a premiere of the film Suicide Squad in 2016. The Beacon has also hosted some films for the annual Tribeca Film Festival, including Love, Gilda in 2018 and Apocalypse Now in 2019.

=== Other events ===
The Beacon has hosted several tributes. These included a memorial to actor John Barrymore in 1982; a show in honor of jazz musician Duke Ellington in 1989; and the Zappa Plays Zappa concert in 2006, a tribute to musician Frank Zappa. The Beacon has also been used for parties, such as a 1988 event to celebrate the opening of the Broadway musical The Phantom of the Opera, as well as a birthday party for then-U.S. Senator Hillary Clinton in 2006.

The Beacon has also been used for benefits. For example, in 1975, the theater hosted a jazz concert to fund opposition to Riverside Church's planned sale of its radio station WRVR-FM. A concert was hosted in December 1986 to fund opposition to the Beacon Theatre's proposed conversion into a nightclub, followed by another concert in June 1987 for the same purpose. The biennial autism-awareness benefit "Night of Too Many Stars", hosted by Jon Stewart, has also been hosted at the Beacon several times, including in 2008, 2010, and 2015.

The Beacon Theatre started hosting the New York Music Awards in 1987, the year after the award was founded. The awards were hosted annually at the Beacon until 1992. The Broadway League temporarily relocated the Tony Awards, the annual ceremony for Broadway theatre, to the Beacon in the early 2010s due to prior bookings at the ceremony's traditional home, Radio City Music Hall. The Beacon thus hosted the 65th Tony Awards in 2011; the theater also hosted the 66th Tony Awards in 2012 because the Beacon had a "multi-year contract" with the Tonys, Another extended run at Radio City forced the Tonys to again relocate to the Beacon in 2016, when the latter theater hosted the 70th Tony Awards.

== See also ==
- List of New York City Designated Landmarks in Manhattan from 59th to 110th Streets
- National Register of Historic Places listings in Manhattan from 59th to 110th Streets
