= Calder's set for Socrate =

Coordinates: 40°46′51″N 73°58′52″W

Recreation of Decor for Satie’s “Socrate” (full scale), 1976
- Artist: Alexander Calder
- Year: 1976
- Type: Mobile Set
- Owner: Joel Thome

The original Decor for Satie's "Socrate" was designed by mobile artist Alexander Calder for a touring performance of Erik Satie’s symphonic drama Socrate in 1936. It was a mobile set considered by Virgil Thomson as one of the masterpieces of twentieth-century theatre design. It consisted of three elements: a red disc, interlocking steel hoops, and a vertical rectangle, black on one side and white on the other, against a blue backdrop. Destroyed in a fire in 1936, the decor was recreated by Walter Hatke in 1976 for a performance in New York.

== Background ==
“A sense of drama is evident in much of Calder’s work, and his predilection for strong color, movement and large scale led naturally to the theater,” wrote Jean Lipman in the Whitney Museum of American Art catalogue Calder’s Universe .

One of Calder’s first stage commissions was the mobile decor made in February 1936 for a production of Erik Satie’s Socrate at the Wadsworth Atheneum in Hartford, sponsored by a group with the amusing name the Friends and Enemies of Modern Music. The original Decor for Satie's "Socrate" was destroyed in a fire after the Colorado Springs Fine Arts Center performance of Socrate in 1936.

Calder discussed the set in The Painter's Object saying : I did a setting for Satie’s Socrate in Hartford, U.S.A., which I will describe, as it serves as an indication of a good deal of my subsequent work.

The set creation happened at a time when he was beginning to move from small, studio sculpture to large outdoor work, and Socrate gave Calder an opportunity to transpose his moving sculpture to monumental scale. He took the great empty space of the stage and filled it not only with forms but with the movement of those forms through space and time––an exercise more akin to dance than to sculpture.

== Recreating the decor ==
In 1975, exactly forty years after he had asked Calder to make this Socrate set, Virgil Thomson found himself reminiscing about the Friends and Enemies of Modern Music with Joel Thome, director of the Philadelphia Composers Forum/Orchestra of Our Time. Thomson’s vivid description of the 1936 production of Socrate inspired Thome with the idea of re-creating Calder’s lost set. In May 1975 Thomson wrote to Calder at his home in France.

Within days the reply came: "It would be fun to revive that bit". In October, Calder was in New York for his annual visit and exhibition at the Perls Galleries. Klaus and Dolly Perls arranged a meeting of Alexander Calder and Joel Thome and asked Jean Lipman and Richard Marshall, who were preparing for the Whitney Museum’s Calder retrospective, to join them. Calder gave Thome his permission for the revival. It was decided that the set would be built in two versions––one the original size and the other roughly one-third smaller––and that work would be done in New York by Walter Hatke, who worked at Perls Galleries.

The plans were sent to Calder in June 1976. He signed them and indicated that construction could proceed. Using the drawings, Hatke set to work on a tabletop model and the 2:3-scale and full-scale recreations while Calder was in France. In October Calder and Thome met again at Perls Galleries. Calder instructed the use of a blue cyclorama (The only important detail not in the 1937 sketch). About the lighting Calder concluded: "About the rest, you can use your imagination in a theatre." Calder asked Thome to pick him up on November 11 so that Calder could review the decor. As Thome was about to phone to confirm the time, he received word of Calder's sudden death.

== The National Tribute to Alexander Calder ==
The production of Socrate was postponed for a year and reconceived as a memorial tribute to Alexander Calder. The recreated mobile was as much a part of the production as the music and script. The tribute performances took place at the Beacon Theatre in New York on 10 and 11 November 1977, both of which were sold out.

== Lawsuits ==
The recreated sets have been the subject of several lawsuits brought by Joel Thome against the Calder Foundation. In 2007, Thome sued the Calder Foundation after the Foundation refused to authenticate the recreated stage sets. The court dismissed the case and ordered that Thome pay the Foundation’s costs associated with the lawsuit. Thome appealed the decision, and the Appellate Division of the New York Supreme Court rejected the appeal in 2009, finding that the court did not have the power to declare the purported Calder works authentic nor to order the Calder Foundation to include them in the catalogue raisonné. This decision set an important precedent protecting artist’s estates and foundations when offering their expert opinions.

In 2014, Thome filed another lawsuit against the Calder Foundation for alleged antitrust violations, claiming that the Calder Foundation prevented him from selling the recreated stage sets. Thome and the Calder Foundation settled the lawsuit in 2015 after the Foundation disclosed to Thome the application numbers assigned by the Foundation to the recreated stage sets and the parties agreed on a written description of the history of works that is required to accompany any statement of sale for the works.

In 2017, after failing to have the sets auctioned by Phillips auction house, Thome again sued the Calder Foundation, claiming that the Foundation interfered with his auctioning the sets at Phillips. The court found no such interference and granted the Calder Foundation summary judgment on all claims and ordered that Thome pay the Foundation’s costs for the lawsuit. When Thome appealed this decision, the Court affirmed the lower court’s decision.
