= List of composers and their preferred lyricists =

Most (classical) composers had one or a few lyricists with whom they preferred to work:

- Bach: Picander
- Mozart: Da Ponte
- Sullivan: Gilbert
- Verdi: Piave, Boito
- Isaac Albéniz: Francis Burdett Money-Coutts
- Richard Strauss: Hugo von Hofmannsthal
- Puccini: Illica and Giacosa
- Satie: Contamine, Plato (when composing Socrate: Platon s'avère comme un collaborateur parfait, très doux, jamais importun - "Plato shows himself a perfect coworker, very soft, never out of line")
- Amadeo Vives: Federico Romero and Guillermo Fernández Shaw
- Rodgers: Hammerstein
- Gershwin: Ira Gershwin
- Andrew Lloyd Webber: Tim Rice, followed by Don Black
- Bertold Hummel: Hermann Hesse
- Handel: Haym, Jennens
- Bellini: Romani
- Gluck: Calzabigi
- Galuppi: Goldoni
- Haydn: Swieten
- Mendelssohn: Schubring
- Hasse: Metastasio

== Composers that preferred to write their own libretti ==
- Richard Wagner
- Arrigo Boito
- Modest Mussorgsky
- Leoš Janáček
- Olivier Messiaen
- Cole Porter
- Gian Carlo Menotti
- Irving Berlin
- Stephen Sondheim
- Michael Tippett
