= Kazuko Hillyer International =

Kazuko Hillyer International Inc was a performing arts production and management organization based in New York City. It was formed by Kazuko Hillyer in 1970. It arranged tours for a variety of clients, including the Tokyo String Quartet, the Los Angeles Philharmonic, the Grand Kabuki, the Jewish Theater of Romania and the Zambia National Folk and Music Ensemble.

== History ==
The business was at first run out of the apartment Kazuko Hillyer shared with her husband, Juilliard String Quartet co-founder Raphael Hillyer. An early success was a successful arrangement in 1972 with musicians in East Germany, which was before that time closed to cultural exchanges with the West. By 1975 the Hillyer organization represented 50 conductors and soloists and 20 orchestras worldwide.

The company was notably responsible for organizing the Metropolitan Opera's first tour to Japan in May–June 1975. Hillyer successfully brokered a sponsorship deal for the tour with the Chubu-Nippon Broadcasting Company. The Met, which at the time was experiencing financial difficulties, jumped at a chance for three weeks of opera performances that had all costs covered and generated income for the company. The company toured Japan for three weeks, giving performances in Tokyo, Osaka and Nagoya.

General director Schuyler Chapin and Hillyer were able to secure many of the world's leading opera singers for the tour. Their production of La traviata starred Joan Sutherland as Violetta and Robert Merrill as Germont with Sutherland's husband, Richard Bonynge, conducting. Marilyn Horne portrayed the title role in Carmen for the tour with conductor Henry Lewis, Lucine Amara is Micaela, and James McCracken as Don José. The role of Rodolfo in the tour's La bohème was alternated in performances between tenors Franco Corelli and Luciano Pavarotti with Dorothy Kirsten as Mimi.

In 1992, the company filed for Chapter 11 bankruptcy, which was soon converted to Chapter 7.
