= Socrate =

Composition by Erik Satie

- by Erik Satie
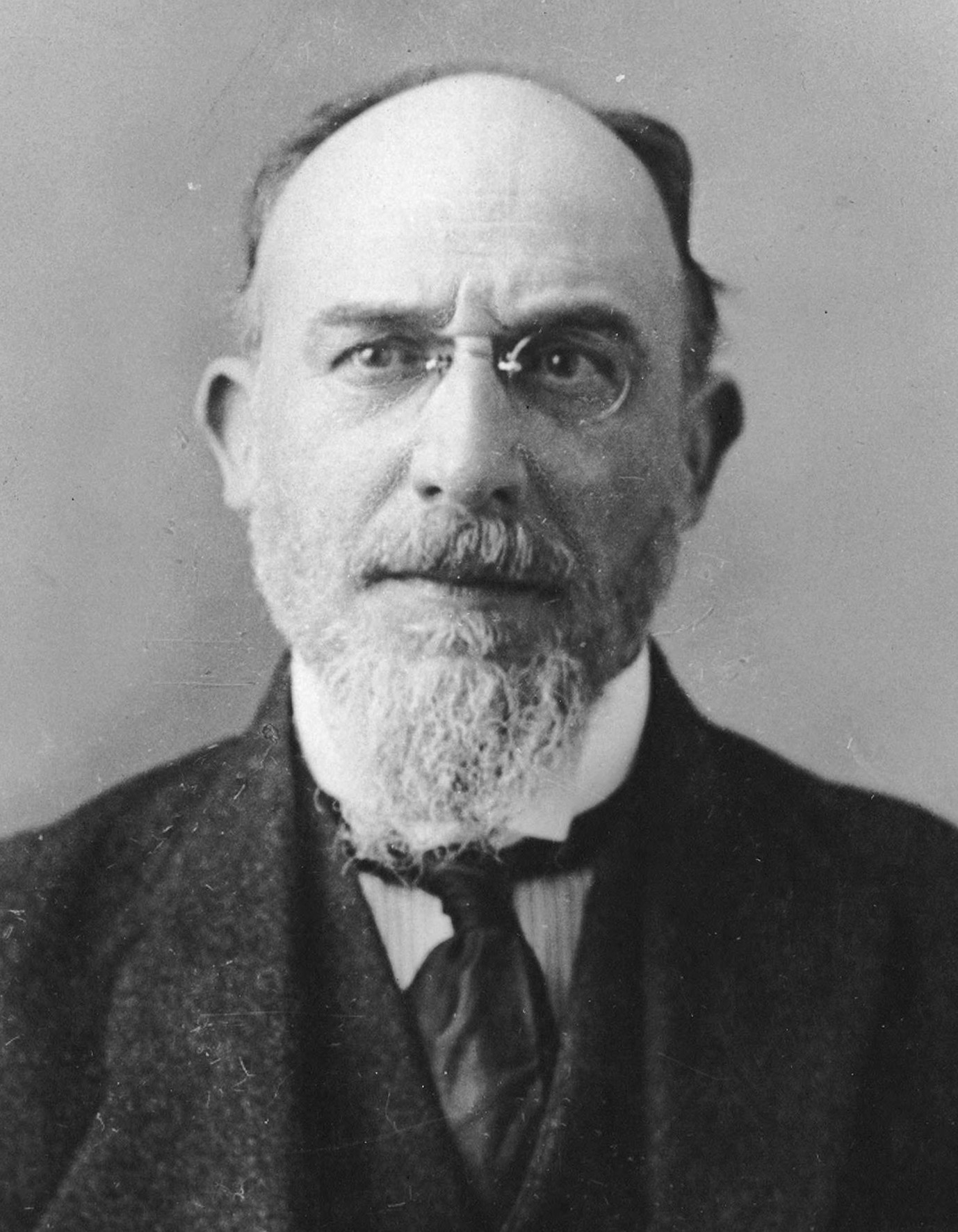
- Erik Satie, circa 1919
- Form: Symphonic drama
- Commissioned by: Princess Edmond de Polignac
- Text: Plato's Symposium, Phaedrus, and Phaedo, translated by Victor Cousin
- Language: French
- Composed: January 1917 – October 1918:
- Performed: April 1918: salons of the Princess de Polignac
- Published: 1919:

Socrate is a work for voice and piano (or small orchestra) by Erik Satie. First published in 1919 for voice and piano, in 1920 a different publisher reissued the piece "revised and corrected". A third version of the work exists, for small orchestra and voice, for which the manuscript has disappeared and which is available now only in print. The text is composed of excerpts of Victor Cousin's translation of Plato's dialogues, all of the chosen texts referring to Socrates.

== Commission – composition ==
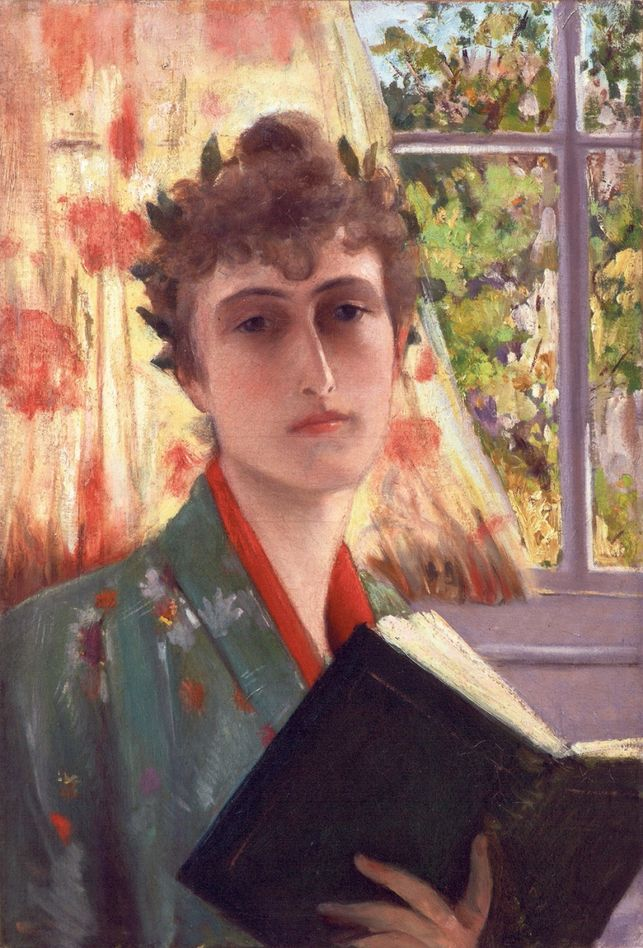
Self portrait by Winnaretta Singer, Princess Edmond de Polignac (Fondation Singer-Polignac, Paris)

The work was commissioned by Princess Edmond de Polignac in October 1916. The Princess had specified that female voices should be used: originally the idea had been that Satie would write incidental music to a performance where the Princess and/or some of her (female) friends would read aloud texts of the ancient Greek philosophers. As Satie, after all, was not so much in favour of melodrama-like settings, that idea was abandoned, and the text would be sung — be it in a more or less reciting way. However, the specification remained that only female voices could be used (for texts of dialogues that were supposed to have taken place between men).

Satie composed Socrate between January 1917 and the spring of 1918, with a revision of the orchestral score in October of that same year. During the first months he was working on the composition, he called it Vie de Socrate. In 1917 Satie was hampered by a lawsuit over an insulting postcard he had sent, which nearly resulted in prison time. The Princess diverted this danger by her financial intercession in the first months of 1918, after which Satie could work free of fear.

== Form ==
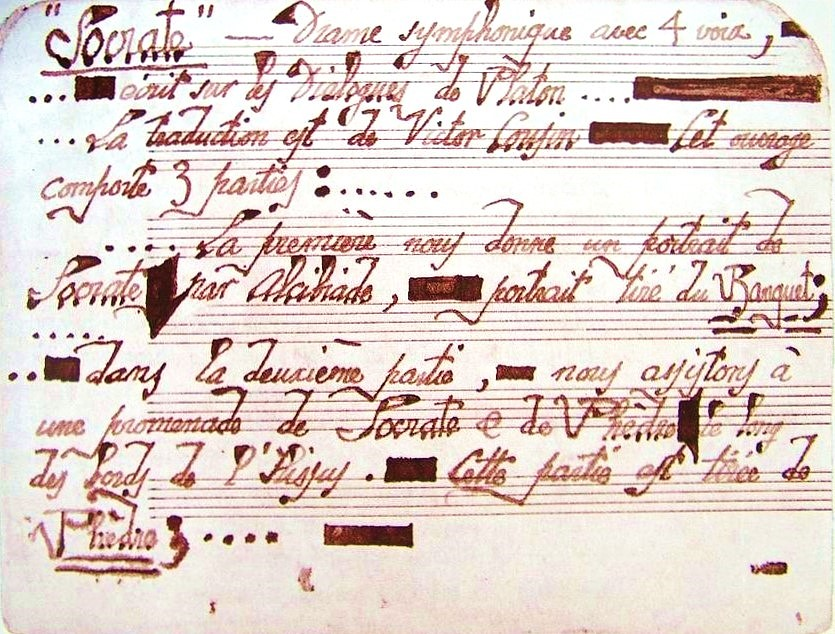
First page of Satie's manuscript for Socrate

Satie presents Socrate as a "symphonic drama in three parts".

"Symphonic drama" appears to allude to Romeo et Juliette, a "dramatic symphony" that Hector Berlioz had written nearly eighty years earlier: and as usual, when Satie makes such allusions, the result is about the complete reversal of the former example. Where Berlioz's symphony is more than an hour and a half of expressionistic, heavily orchestrated drama, an opera forced into the form of a symphony, Satie's thirty-minute composition reveals little drama in the music: the drama is entirely concentrated in the text, which is presented in the form of recitativo-style singing to a background of sparsely orchestrated, nearly repetitive music, picturing some aspects of Socrates' life, including his final moments.

The work differs from the musical forms of the period. The work is not acted and no scenery is required, unlike opera. Furthermore, the text is delivered by female voices, including the words of male characters. It lacks any musical sections that might be considered arias, with the text delivered instead as recitative.

This procedure is similar to secular cantatas for one or two voices and instrumental accompaniment written by many Italian and German Baroque composers such as Vivaldi (RV 649–686), Handel (HWV 77–177), Bach (BWV 203, 209), etc. However, these older compositions all alternated recitatives with arias, while Socrate is composed entirely as recitative.

The three parts of the composition are:

1. Portrait de Socrate ("Portrait of Socrates"), text taken from Plato's Symposium
2. Les bords de l'Ilissus ("The banks of the Ilissus"), text taken from Plato's Phaedrus
3. Mort de Socrate ("Death of Socrates"), text taken from Plato's Phaedo

== Music ==
The piece is written for voice and orchestra, but also exists in a version for voice and piano. This reduction had been produced by Satie, concurrently with the orchestral version.

Each speaker in the various sections is meant to be represented by a different singer (Alcibiades, Socrates, Phaedrus, Phaedo), according to Satie's indication two of these voices soprano, the two other mezzo-sopranos.

Nonetheless all parts are more or less in the same range, and the work can easily be sung by a single voice, and has often been performed and recorded by a single vocalist, female as well as male. Such single vocalist performances diminish however the effect of dialogue (at least in the two first parts of the symphonic drama – in the third part there is only Phaedo telling the story of Socrates' death).

The music is characterised by simple repetitive rhythms, parallel cadences, and long ostinati.

== Text ==
Although more recent translations were available, Satie preferred Victor Cousin's then antiquated French translation of Plato's texts: he found in them more clarity, simplicity and beauty.

The translation of the libretto of Socrate that follows is taken from Benjamin Jowett's translations of Plato's dialogues that can be found on the Gutenberg Project website. The original French text can be found here.

=== Part I – Portrait of Socrates ===
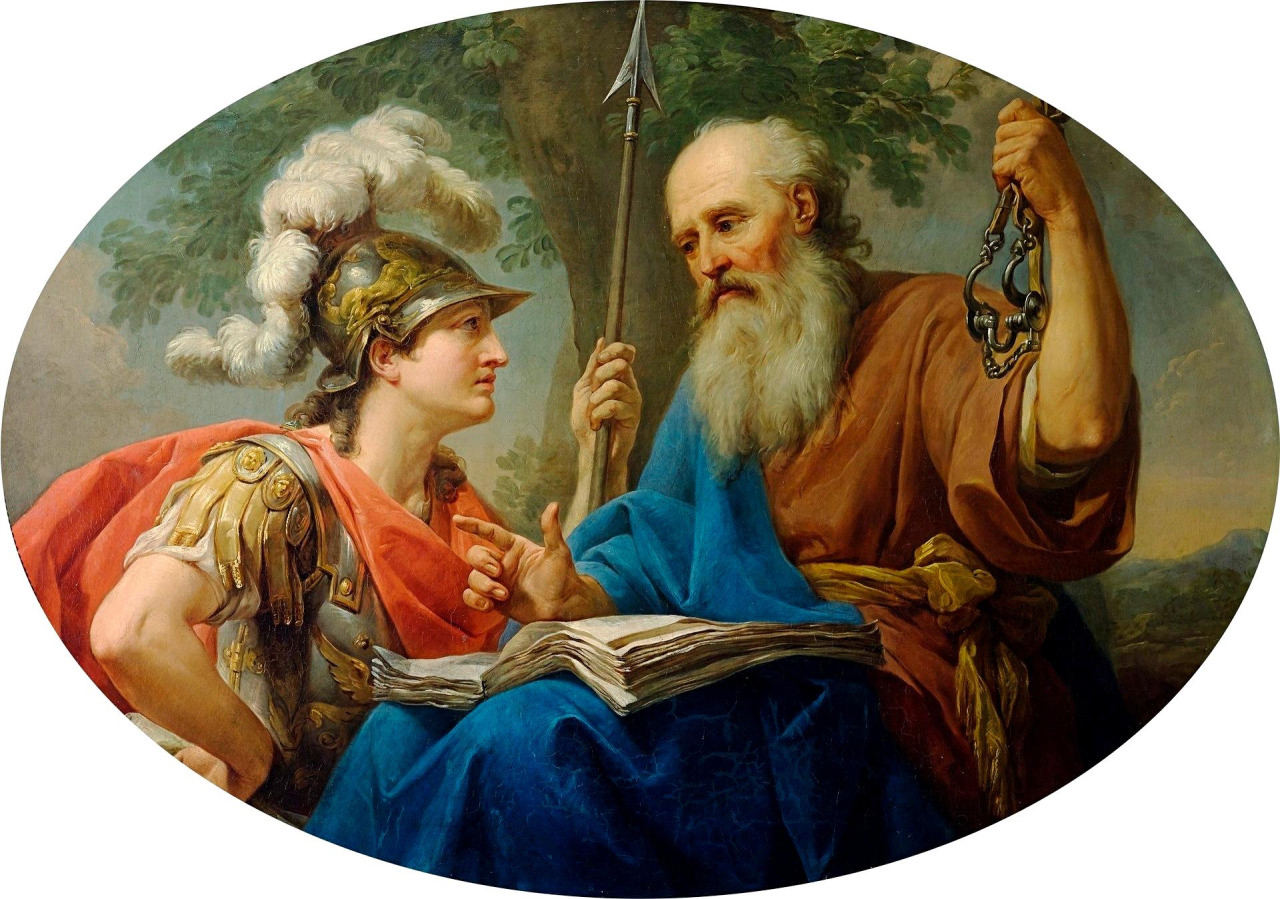
Marcello Bacciarelli, Alcibiades and Socrates

[From Symposium, 215a-e, 222e]

Alcibiades
And now, my boys, I shall praise Socrates in a figure which will appear to him to be a caricature, and yet I speak, not to make fun of him, but only for the truth's sake. I say, that he is exactly like the busts of Silenus, which are set up in the statuaries' shops, holding pipes and flutes in their mouths; and they are made to open in the middle, and have images of gods inside them. I say also that he is like Marsyas the satyr. [...] And are you not a flute-player? That you are, and a performer far more wonderful than Marsyas. He indeed with instruments used to charm the souls of men by the power of his breath, and the players of his music do so still: for the melodies of Olympus are derived from Marsyas who taught them [...] But you produce the same effect with your words only, and do not require the flute: that is the difference between you and him. [...] And if I were not afraid that you would think me hopelessly drunk, I would have sworn as well as spoken to the influence which they have always had and still have over me. For my heart leaps within me more than that of any Corybantian reveller, and my eyes rain tears when I hear them. And I observe that many others are affected in the same manner. [...] And this is what I and many others have suffered from the flute-playing of this satyr.

Socrates
[...] you praised me, and I in turn ought to praise my neighbour on the right [...]

=== Part II – On the banks of the Ilissus ===
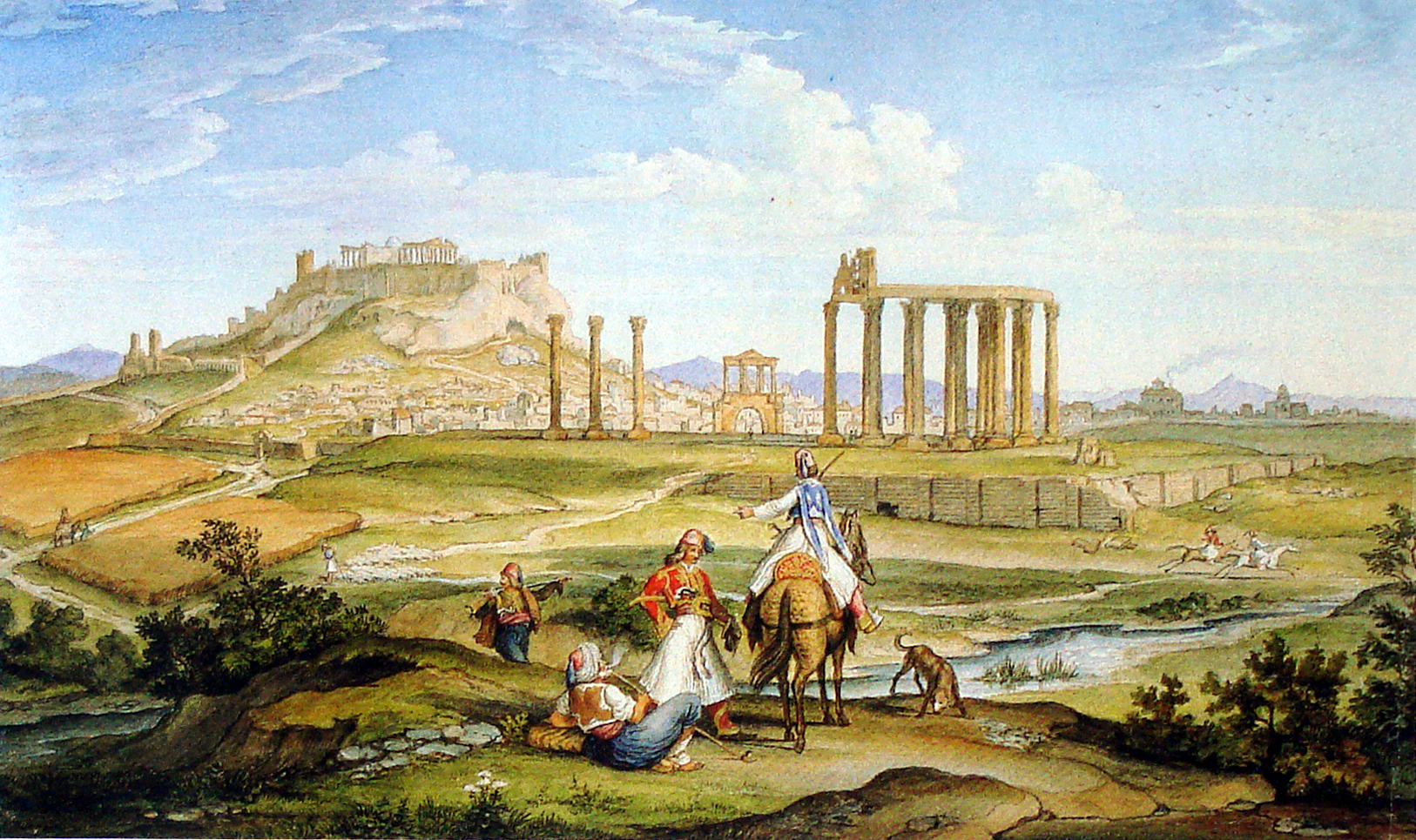
The ruins of ancient Athens as seen from the river Ilisos (Ilissus) in 1833. Today this river runs mostly underground.

[From Phaedrus, 229a-230c]

Socrates
Let us turn aside and go by the Ilissus; we will sit down at some quiet spot.

Phaedrus
I am fortunate in not having my sandals, and as you never have any, I think that we may go along the brook and cool our feet in the water; this will be the easiest way, and at midday and in the summer is far from being unpleasant.

Socrates
Lead on, and look out for a place in which we can sit down.

Phaedrus
Do you see the tallest plane-tree in the distance?

Socrates
Yes.

Phaedrus
There are shade and gentle breezes, and grass on which we may either sit or lie down.

Socrates
Move forward.

Phaedrus
I should like to know, Socrates, whether the place is not somewhere here at which Boreas is said to have carried off Orithyia from the banks of the Ilissus?

Socrates
Such is the tradition.

Phaedrus
And is this the exact spot? The little stream is delightfully clear and bright; I can fancy that there might be maidens playing near.

Socrates
I believe that the spot is not exactly here, but about a quarter of a mile lower down, where you cross to the temple of Artemis, and there is, I think, some sort of an altar of Boreas at the place.

Phaedrus
I have never noticed it; but I beseech you to tell me, Socrates, do you believe this tale?

Socrates
The wise are doubtful, and I should not be singular if, like them, I too doubted. I might have a rational explanation that Orithyia was playing with Pharmacia, when a northern gust carried her over the neighbouring rocks; and this being the manner of her death, she was said to have been carried away by Boreas. [...] according to another version of the story she was taken from Areopagus, and not from this place. [...] But let me ask you, friend: have we not reached the plane-tree to which you were conducting us?

Phaedrus
Yes, this is the tree.

Socrates
By Here, a fair resting-place, full of summer sounds and scents. Here is this lofty and spreading plane-tree, and the agnus castus high and clustering, in the fullest blossom and the greatest fragrance; and the stream which flows beneath the plane-tree is deliciously cold to the feet. Judging from the ornaments and images, this must be a spot sacred to Achelous and the Nymphs. How delightful is the breeze:--so very sweet; and there is a sound in the air shrill and summerlike which makes answer to the chorus of the cicadae. But the greatest charm of all is the grass, like a pillow gently sloping to the head. My dear Phaedrus, you have been an admirable guide.

=== Part III – Death of Socrates ===
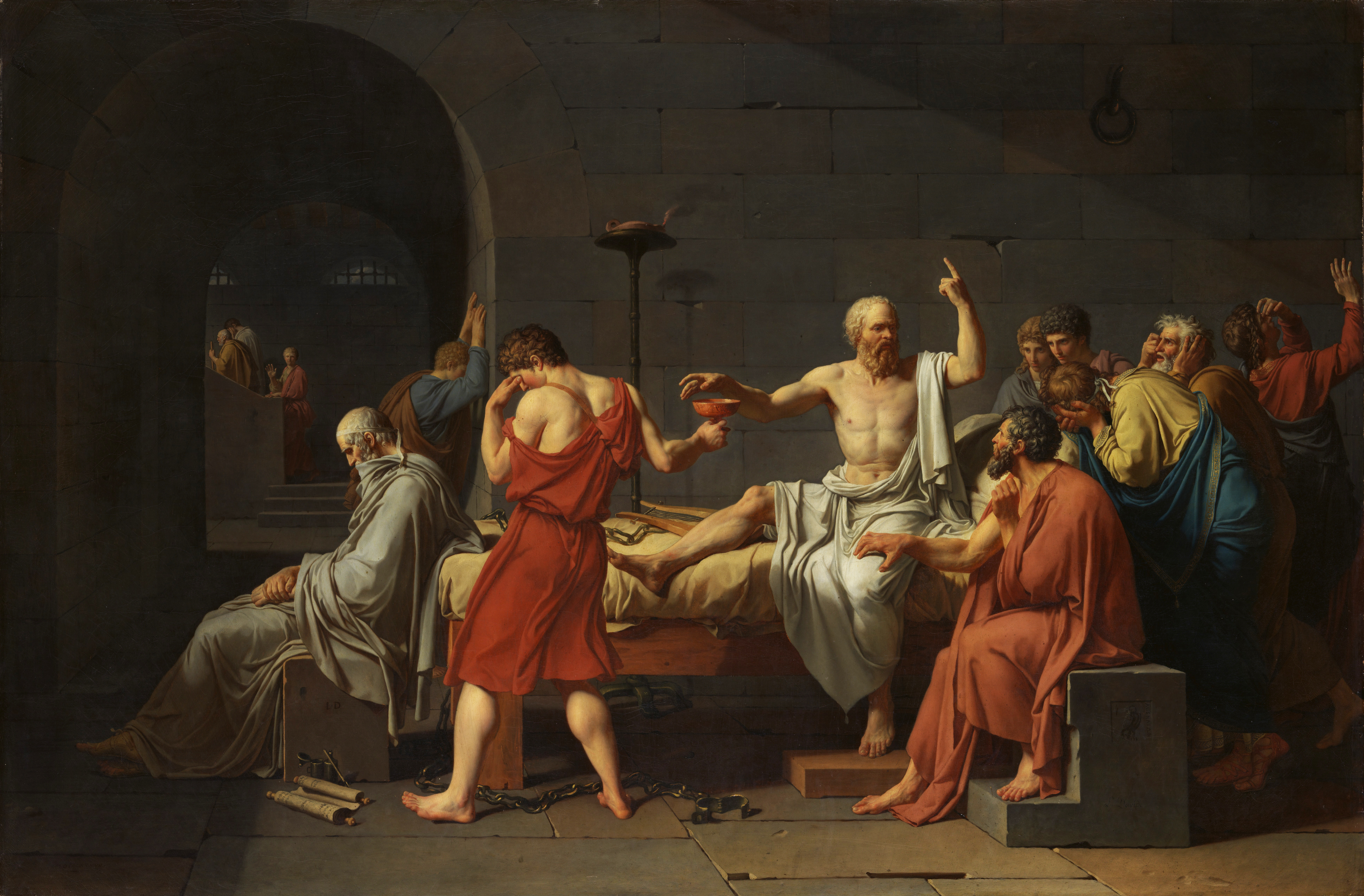
Jacques-Louis David - The Death of Socrates

[From Phaedo, 3–33–35–38–65–66-67]

Phaedo
As [...] Socrates lay in prison [...] we had been in the habit of assembling early in the morning at the court in which the trial took place, and which is not far from the prison. There we used to wait talking with one another until the opening of the doors (for they were not opened very early); then we went in and generally passed the day with Socrates. [...] On our arrival the jailer who answered the door, instead of admitting us, came out and told us to stay until he called us. [...] He soon returned and said that we might come in. On entering we found Socrates just released from chains, and Xanthippe, whom you know, sitting by him, and holding his child in her arms. [...] Socrates, sitting up on the couch, bent and rubbed his leg, saying, as he was rubbing: "How singular is the thing called pleasure, and how curiously related to pain, which might be thought to be the opposite of it; [...] Why, because each pleasure and pain is a sort of nail which nails and rivets the soul to the body [...] I am not very likely to persuade other men that I do not regard my present situation as a misfortune, if I cannot even persuade you that I am no worse off now than at any other time in my life. Will you not allow that I have as much of the spirit of prophecy in me as the swans? For they, when they perceive that they must die, having sung all their life long, do then sing more lustily than ever, rejoicing in the thought that they are about to go away to the god whose ministers they are." [...]

Often, [...] I have wondered at Socrates, but never more than on that occasion. [...] I was close to him on his right hand, seated on a sort of stool, and he on a couch which was a good deal higher. He stroked my head, and pressed the hair upon my neck—he had a way of playing with my hair; and then he said: "To-morrow, Phaedo, I suppose that these fair locks of yours will be severed." [...] When he had spoken these words, he arose and went into a chamber to bathe; Crito followed him and told us to wait. [...] When he came out, he sat down with us again after his bath, but not much was said. Soon the jailer, who was the servant of the Eleven, entered and stood by him, saying: "To you, Socrates, whom I know to be the noblest and gentlest and best of all who ever came to this place, I will not impute the angry feelings of other men, who rage and swear at me, when, in obedience to the authorities, I bid them drink the poison—indeed, I am sure that you will not be angry with me; for others, as you are aware, and not I, are to blame. And so fare you well, and try to bear lightly what must needs be—you know my errand." Then bursting into tears he turned away and went out. Socrates looked at him and said: "I return your good wishes, and will do as you bid." Then turning to us, he said: "How charming the man is: since I have been in prison he has always been coming to see me, and at times he would talk to me, and was as good to me as could be, and now see how generously he sorrows on my account. We must do as he says, Crito; and therefore let the cup be brought, if the poison is prepared: if not, let the attendant prepare some." [...]

Crito made a sign to the servant, who was standing by; and he went out, and having been absent for some time, returned with the jailer carrying the cup of poison. Socrates said: "You, my good friend, who are experienced in these matters, shall give me directions how I am to proceed." The man answered: "You have only to walk about until your legs are heavy, and then to lie down, and the poison will act." At the same time he handed the cup to Socrates [...] Then raising the cup to his lips, quite readily and cheerfully he drank off the poison. And hitherto most of us had been able to control our sorrow; but now when we saw him drinking, and saw too that he had finished the draught, we could no longer forbear, and in spite of myself my own tears were flowing fast; so that I covered my face and wept, not for him, but at the thought of my own calamity in having to part from such a friend. [...] and he walked about until, as he said, his legs began to fail, and then he lay on his back, according to the directions, and the man who gave him the poison now and then looked at his feet and legs; and after a while he pressed his foot hard, and asked him if he could feel; and he said: "No"; and then his leg, and so upwards and upwards, and showed us that he was cold and stiff. And he felt them himself, and said: "When the poison reaches the heart, that will be the end." He was beginning to grow cold about the groin, when he uncovered his face, for he had covered himself up, and said—they were his last words—he said: "Crito, I owe a cock to Asclepius; will you remember to pay the debt?" [...] in a minute or two a movement was heard, and the attendants uncovered him; his eyes were set, and Crito closed his eyes and mouth. Such was the end, Echecrates, of our friend; concerning whom I may truly say, that of all the men of his time whom I have known, he was the wisest and justest and best.

== Whiteness ==
Satie described he meant Socrate to be white, and mentions to his friends that for achieving that whiteness, he gets himself into the right mood by eating nothing other than "white" foods. He wants Socrate to be transparent, lucid, and unimpassioned – not so surprising as counter-reaction to the turmoil that came over him for writing an offensive postcard. He also appreciated the fragile humanity of the ancient Greek philosophers to which he was devoting his music.

== Reception ==
=== Early performances ===
Parts of the work were first performed privately in April 1918 with the composer at the piano and Jane Bathori singing all vocal parts, in the salons of the Princess de Polignac.

Several more performances of the piano version (from the vocal score) were staged both publicly and privately. Amongst others, literati such as André Gide, James Joyce and Paul Valéry attended. It was published at the end of 1919. Gertrude Stein became an admirer of Satie hearing Virgil Thomson perform extracts from Socrate.

In June 1920, the orchestral version was premièred. The audience believed they were hearing a new musical joke by the composer; in response, they laughed and applauded. Satie was disappointed in their reactions and felt misunderstood.

The orchestral version was not printed until several decades after Satie's death.

=== Reception in music, theatre and art history ===
Summarising the critical reception at the time of the first performance, Hanlon states that "A small minority of critics praised this audacious aesthetic approach, however, the consensus was that it represented a form of musical impoverishment".

In 1936 Virgil Thomson asked Alexander Calder to create a stage set for Socrate. New York Times critic Robert Shattuck described the 1977 National Tribute to Alexander Calder performance, “I have always gone away with the feeling that Socrate creates a large space that it does not itself completely fill… Here, of course, is where Calder comes in: He was commissioned to do sets for Socrate in 1936.” In 1936 the American premiere of Socrate, with a mobile set by Alexander Calder was held at the Wadsworth Atheneum. The work then traveled to the Colorado Springs Fine Arts Center for the opening week of the FAC.

John Cage transcribed the music of Socrate for two pianos in 1944 for Merce Cunningham's dance, titled Idyllic Song. A later dance, Second Hand, was also based on Satie's Socrate. When in 1969 Éditions Max Eschig refused performing rights, Cage made Cheap Imitation, based on an identical rhythmic structure. In 2015, ninety years after Satie's death, Cage's 1944 setting was performed by Alexei Lubimov and Slava Poprugin for the CD Paris joyeux & triste.

Belgian painter Jan Cox made two paintings on the theme of the death of Socrates (1952 and 1979, a year before his suicide). Both paintings refer to Satie's work: pieces of the printed score of Satie's Socrate were glued on one of these paintings; the other has quotes of Cousin's translation of Plato on the frame.

Mark Morris created a dance in 1983 to the third section of Socrate, The Death of Socrates with a set design by Robert Bordo. Morris later choreographed the entire work, which premiered in 2010 (costume design by Martin Pakledinaz, lighting design and decor by Michael Chybowski).

== Recordings ==
- This (abandoned) webpage gives an overview of recordings of Socrate up to the early 21st century: https://web.archive.org/web/20050406001920/http://hem.passagen.se/satie/db/socrate.htm

Recorded in 2015 and released in 2016 on the Winter & Winter CD label: Barbara Hannigan, soprano, and Reinbert de Leeuw, piano - Socrate with melodies by Satie. Also search Barbara Hannigan Socrate on Youtube.

Orchestral version recorded in 1954, available in the INA [French Institut national de l'audiovisuel] "memoire vivre" series of CDs [Suzanne Danco No. 2]: Suzanne Danco, soprano, Symphonic Orchestra of Rome of the RAI conducted by Darius Milhaud. Also search Suzanne Danco Socrate on YouTube.

== See also ==
- List of composers and their preferred lyricists
