= A Yank Comes Back =

1949 documentary film

A Yank Comes Back is a 1949 documentary film directed by Colin Dean, starring and written by Burgess Meredith. Meredith produced it when filming Mine Own Executioner in Britain.
